= David Faure =

South African Protestant minister (1842–1916)

Head of The Unitarian Church in South Africa
- In office 1867–1896
- Preceded by: Church was founded
- Succeeded by: Ramsden Balmforth

Grand Master of Lodge de Goede Hoop (South African Freemasons)
- In office 1893–1897
- Preceded by: Hofmeyr, J.H.
- Succeeded by: Lewis, C.E.

Personal details
- Born: David Pieter Faure; November 11, 1842 Stellenbosch, Cape Province, South Africa
- Died: August 17, 1916 (aged 73) Cape Town, Cape Province, South Africa
- Spouse: Helena Johanna Augusta Munnik
- Children: 6
- Education: Leiden University
- Known for: Unitarianism, Freemasonry and being an Interpreter

David Pieter Faure was the founder of the Unitarian Church in South Africa, an interpreter and a Grand Master of the Freemasons in South Africa.

== Roots ==
Faure was born in Stellenbosch, Cape Province, South Africa on 11 November 1842. He was the younger of two sons of Abraham Faure and Dorothea Susanna de Villiers. He married Helena Johanna Augusta Munnik on 17 March 1871. He died in Cape Town on 17 August 1916. He studied theology at the University of Leiden in the Netherlands up to 1866, when he graduated.

== Influences picked up in the Netherlands ==
The denomination under which he studied was Dutch Reformed. He had become aware of different ways of thinking (free thinking). This was expressed to him by Prof. J.H. Scholten. Upon his return to South Africa in 1866, the Dutch Reformed Church had a panel of theological experts that interviewed graduates before admitting them to the church (called Colloquium Doctum) (Latin). Due to the liberal influence Faure was under in Holland, he was not admitted as pastor. The Colloquium Doctum was put in place, as two theological contemporaries of him, Thomas François Burgers from Hanover (1862) and Kotze, J.J. from Darling (1864), were suspended as they differed from the church-prescribed theory.

== Founding of the Unitarian Church ==
In 1867, Faure founded the Unitarian Church. It was first called the Free Protestant Church. He was pastor up to 1897, when he was succeeded by Rev. Ramsden Balmforth from England. In 1870 his church expanded to Graaff-Reinet.

== Beliefs regarding Darwin's theory of evolution ==
On 30 July 1876 he gave a discourse in church about the Charles Darwin's theory of evolution. Faure believed one could, as a Christian, accept Darwin's evolutionary theory. It was printed in The Standard and Mail (a newspaper).

== Interpreter ==
=== The "Fiat Justitia" case 1880 ===
David Faure was a circuit interpreter from 1872-1880. He was the interpreter in the Koegas murder case. Faure not being satisfied with the case wrote letters to the Argus newspaper. They was address to FJ Dormer the editor. He used a nom de plume: Fiat Justitia (Latin for "let justice always be told"). In his letters he said there was racism and deviance from common law. The newspaper published it. The editor, Dormer, was charged with crimen injuria. The presiding judges were A. Stockenström and H. de Villiers. These judges decided that obstruction of justice did occur and that racism did take place in the court. Thomas Upington the Attorney General was declared incapable of being in such a public position. Judge de Villiers praised Faure but still deprived him of his post. The Argus then employed him as an interpreter.

=== The London Convention ===
When the Zuid-Afrikaansche Republiek delegation under the leadership of President Kruger travelled to London, UK Faure accompanied them as interpreter. The purpose of the visit was the signing of the London Convention. This convention controlled the relations between the UK and the Zuid-Afrikaansche Republiek.

== Freemason ==
He was the Grand Master of Lodge de Goede Hoop (South African Freemasons) from 1893 to 1897, when he took over from Jan Hofmeyer.

== Biography ==
His autobiography was written in 1907.
