= Cape Post =

The Cape Post (1879–1880) was a newspaper that briefly operated in the Cape Colony.

== Founding ==
It was founded in December 1879 by former Cape Argus editor Patrick McLoughlin, as an outlet for his radical liberal opposition to British imperialism. Officially, the paper's purpose was to encourage spontaneous unity in southern Africa, to counter the Colonial office's scheme to impose a system of British-ruled confederation on the region.

While McLoughlin served as business manager, he co-edited it with the controversial firebrand Francis Reginald Statham who had been invited to Cape Town especially for this purpose. Both men also did much of the writing. The offices were based in Cape Town.

== Political controversy ==
Although the paper received strong support from powerful local leaders like Saul Solomon, John Molteno, Charles Fairbridge and John X. Merriman, it was under strong imperial pressure, and went against the prevailing mood in much of the Cape Colony. At the time, the inclusive Molteno Government had just been overthrown, and British control (in the form of a proposed "Confederation") was being solidified across southern Africa. Resulting wars were flaring up from the Transvaal (1st Boer War) and Transkei (9th Frontier War) to Zululand (Anglo-Zulu War). Public opinion had become strongly militant since these events, and the new publication came under sustained attack - legal and public.

Controversy arose quickly during the notorious "Koegas affair" (1879–80). This concerned the murder of San people (Bushmen) by farmers, near the northern frontier. In the subsequent murder trial, the farmers were acquitted, and the resulting outrage focused on Attorney General Thomas Upington. The Cape Argus and Cape Post accused Upington of deliberately allowing the trial to take place in a racist and hostile town that would be expected to acquit the murderers, due to prejudice and local influence. The culmination of the outrage was a public campaign, led by the Cape Post editors among others, accusing Upington and his colleagues of allowing white juries to acquit white murderers from murdering blacks.

== Closure ==
The paper quickly ran into financial difficulties and was forced to close in 1880. Its two editors dispersed; Statham leaving the country, and McLoughlin moving to Oudtschoorn in the Karoo where he shot himself soon afterwards.
