= Patrick McLoughlin (editor) =

South African newspaper editor

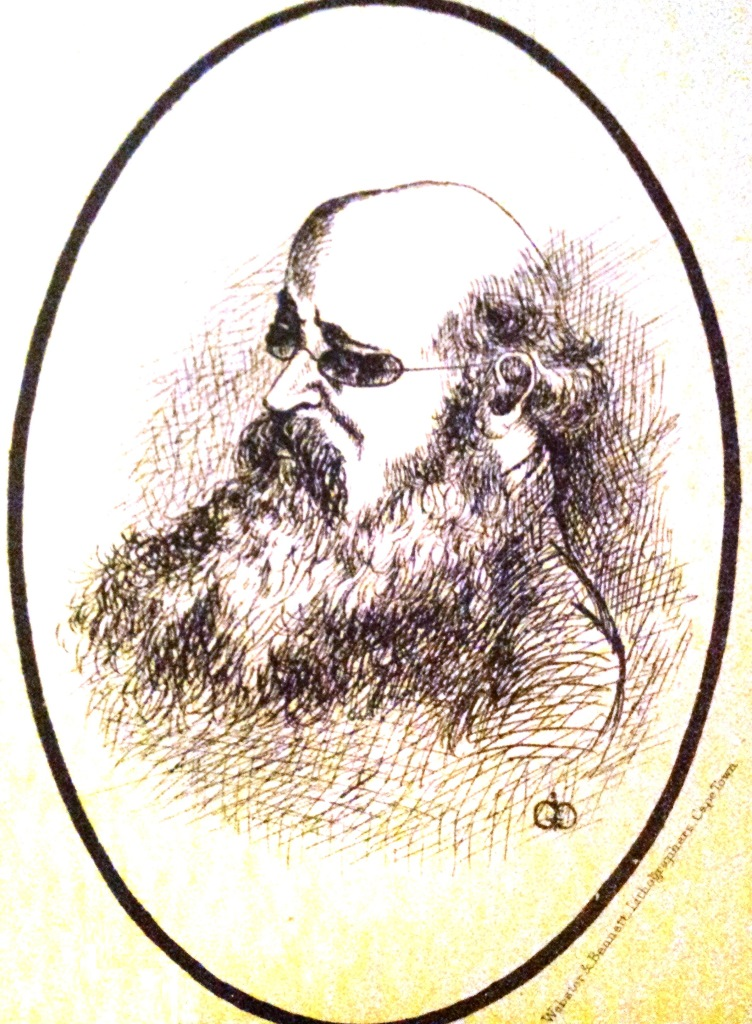
Paddy McLoughlin. Caricature by the opposing Lantern newspaper in 1879

Patrick McLoughlin (also McLaughlin; 1835–1882) was a newspaper editor of the British Cape Colony, in what is now South Africa.

== Early life and education ==
Born in Ireland, McLoughlin emigrated to the Cape Colony in 1861, as a sergeant in the 59th regiment, until he was discharged after suffering an injury that seriously damaged his sight. He moved to Cape Town and founded a school on Boom (modern Commercial) street, in a part of Cape Town that was a slum at the time. Being intensely reflective and literary however, he soon became known for his remarkable letters to the Cape's leading newspapers (always under the pen-name "Scotus").

He went on to edit three newspapers in his career. Throughout his career, his writings and his editing were distinguished by their liberal and inclusive ideology and their concern over the rights of the Cape's Black African citizens. While this made him very popular in the relatively liberal 1870s, it caused him a great deal of controversy as popular opinion became more reactionary and pro-imperialist in the early 1880s.

== The Cape Argus (1871-1879) ==
His free-lance writings came to the attention of the Cape Argus as early as 1861, and he soon became a printer's reader for that paper's parent company, Saul Solomon & Co., from where he rapidly rose in position.

In 1871 he was appointed editor for the Cape Argus, taking over from Thomas Ekins Fuller. He continued to do a great deal of the writing, and his humble manner and direct style of writing made him hugely popular. He was also known for his unpretentious manner and his "genuine journalistic faculty of mingling freely with his fellow men". However, he was openly partisan on political issues. Whilst editor, he "was greatly in the confidence of the Premier of the time, Sir John Molteno, and vigorously supported him". Both he and the Argus therefore came to be seen as supporters of the Molteno government. McLoughlin also continued to espouse liberal views that, while relatively popular at the time, were still controversial and were to make him unpopular in later, more conservative, years.

=== The "Pro Bono Publico" trial (1878/9) ===
A change came about in 1878 when the British Colonial Office overthrew the elected Cape government and a new bout of imperial expansion began in southern Africa, under the reactionary new government of Gordon Sprigg. Against the background of its frontier wars, the new regime began to move against its opponents.

The Sprigg government targeted the Argus first, arranging that its government contracts were abruptly cancelled. McLoughlin was next, and the attack, when it came, focused on his private writings. McLoughlin had supposedly authored a pamphlet named "Pro Bono Publico" ("For Public Good"), privately and anonymously, during the 1878/9 Legislative Council elections. In addition to several other anonymous papers which criticised leading figures of the British and Settler establishment, these writings were held to constitute libel.

Although it was never proven that McLoughlin did indeed author these papers, the "Pro Bono Publico" trial went badly, McLoughlin's continued position became untenable, and he was forced to resign. This was in spite of strong support from his liberal friends, and from Saul Solomon himself who, in a personal letter to McLoughlin (30 June 1879) admitted that he found the termination "especially painful because it is occasioned by your having been placed in a position which I feel that, as an innocent man, you ought not to occupy".

== The Cape Post (1879-1880) ==
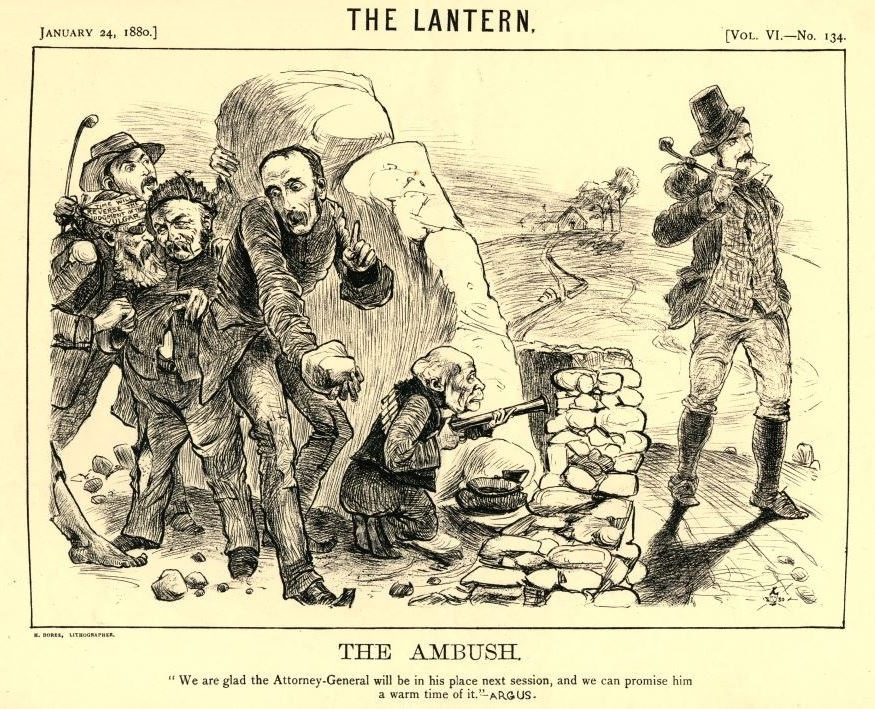
Cartoon in the reactionary Lantern newspaper, in support of Attorney General Thomas Upington (right). The liberal alliance are depicted as bandits (including McLoughlin, Dormer, Merriman and Solomon).

With support from several powerful admirers (including John X. Merriman and the retired former Prime Minister John Molteno) he founded the Cape Post newspaper in 1879, and co-edited it with Francis Reginald Statham.

One of the intended purposes of the Cape Post was to encourage a coming-together of the peoples and states of southern Africa in an organic and locally-driven process. This was in order to counter the influence of the British Colonial Office and the Confederation plan that it was attempting to impose on the subcontinent at the time.

=== The "Fiat Justitia" trial (1879-1880) ===
The unusually liberal Cape Post was controversial, among other reasons, for highlighting cases of violence and discrimination against Black African people in the rural areas of the Cape. Chief among these, were the notorious "Koegas (or Kougas) murders", which led McLoughlin publicly to accuse the Attorney General Thomas Upington of racism. The Cape Post was joined in this campaign by Cape Town's other liberal newspaper at the time, Saul Solomon's Cape Argus, with its new editor Francis Dormer. Specifically, McLoughlin and Solomon accused the Attorney General and his colleagues in the Sprigg government of allowing white juries to acquit whites who had killed blacks. They called for the Attorney General's resignation and for an all-round condemnation of the verdict.

The Sprigg government accused McLoughlin and Solomon of libel and responded with several lawsuits that culminated in what became known as the "Fiat Justitia" trial. In addition, a reactionary campaign arose in support of the Sprigg government's policies, led by publications such as the Lantern. In 1880 McLoughlin was therefore forced to close the Cape Post due to financial difficulties.

== Oudtshoorn and death ==
Later he moved to the small town of Oudtshoorn in the Karoo, where he edited and wrote for the Oudtshoorn Tribune for a year, in effective exile, until he shot himself on 30 June 1882. He was survived by his wife and several children.

Patrick McLoughlin was an extremely diligent and skilled writer, but he was even more known for his thoughtful and empathetic nature. His undoing was his unwillingness or inability to compromise on his feelings and principles, at a time when dissidence was dangerous. Historian Alexander Wilmot summed up McLoughlin as "the very clever, but not, perhaps, sufficiently scrupulous man of letters".
