= Francis Joseph Dormer =

Francis Joseph Dormer (1854 – 31 November 1928) was an influential journalist and newspaper editor in southern Africa.

== Early life ==
He was born in Leicester, England, and emigrated to the Cape Colony in 1875, attracted by the economic boom that the Cape was undergoing at the time. He worked as a teacher at Oscar D'Alton Doualier's academy on Roeland Street, Cape Town, before moving to Port Elizabeth where he worked first for the municipality and then moved to accept a partnership in the Queenstown Representative. In Queenstown he married Agnes Ella.

== Cape Argus editor (1878–1881) ==
The sympathy and style of his reports during the 1877 frontier war attracted the attention of Saul Solomon of the Cape Argus, who appointed the idealistic young journalist as sub-editor of that newspaper. He took over as the Argus' editor in 1878, taking over from his beleaguered predecessor Patrick McLoughlin, who moved to start the liberal Cape Post newspaper with Francis Reginald Statham.

During his term as editor, Dormer was heavily involved in the controversy which followed the "Koegas atrocities", whereby the liberal media of the Cape attacked the incumbent Attorney General Thomas Upington for racism, and which saw Upington fight back with devastating lawsuits against figures such as Saul Solomon and Dormer which culminated in the "Fiat Justitia" trial of 1879. Upington's ally, the Prime Minister Gordon Sprigg, also cancelled all government contracts with the Argus, causing further damage and leaving the newspaper in a very vulnerable state.

== Cape Argus owner (1881) ==
In 1881 Dormer purchased the Cape Argus from Saul Solomon, for the price of 6000 pounds. It was uncertain initially how he had purchased it, as he was known to be very poor.

It was later revealed that the imperialist tycoon Cecil Rhodes had eyed the paper as a potential mouthpiece for his political aims and ideals. He needed Dormer to act as a front for ownership of the newspaper given its history under Solomon of opposition to Rhodes's extravagant imperialism. Rhodes's agent, John Blades Currey, had discreetly handed Dormer an envelope of the money for the purchase, in the square of the Cape Town Grand Parade.

In November 1886, Dormer merged his company with Saul Solomon's printing works, which was being liquidated at the time. Dormer's company, now called the Argus Printing & Publishing Company Ltd., also printed the Cape Mercantile Advertiser, the Argus Annual and the Cape of Good Hope Directory.

== Northward expansion ==
=== Transvaal (1887) ===
He sent a resident director to expand in the Transvaal Republic in 1887. The next year, Dormer himself moved to Pretoria where he bought the Eastern Star newspaper, and relaunched it as the Star.

=== Rhodesia (1892) ===
He founded the first newspaper in the new colony of Rhodesia in 1892 in Salisbury (modern Harare), which he named the Rhodesia Herald. In fact, the very name of the colony, "Rhodesia", had been coined by Dormer. The Herald was run by a syndicate, of which Dormer's company was the largest party. He founded the Bulawayo Chronicle two years later.

== Resignation and reinstatement (1895–1897) ==
While on leave in London, Dormer was visited by Cecil Rhodes and Alfred Beit, who informed Dormer that he was expected to play a role in their planned overthrow of the Transvaal government, via the Jameson raid. Dormer refused, and was therefore forced immediately to cable his resignation to Johannesburg.

Soon afterwards the Transvaal government banned the Star, for its imperialist agenda. The directors appealed to Dormer, who got Kruger's permission to re-form the newspaper with a new name and outlook. Dormer therefore formed the Comet. Later, the Star was reinstated, with Dormer again as editor, before he left for London.

== Later life and legacy ==
Dormer produced the book Vengeance as a policy in Afrikanderland: a plea for a new departure, in 1901 during the Second Anglo-Boer War, in which he blamed British policy for the war. Aside from his regular writings, in later life, he served as a director of several South African companies, as well as the London Chairman for the Transvaal Estates and Development Company.

Dormer's writings were incisive and often quite fierce, causing him controversy and court cases throughout his life. Aside from short stints on the Cape Town council, he avoided political office. However he was a tireless businessman of significant acumen and not without some principles. He regarded himself as a moderate and an Anglo-Afrikaner - who saw his loyalty to the British empire as not incompatible with his South African identity. He was a supporter of the Uitlander cause in the Transvaal, and labelled himself as a "sane imperialist".
