= Francis Reginald Statham =

British writer, composer and newspaper editor

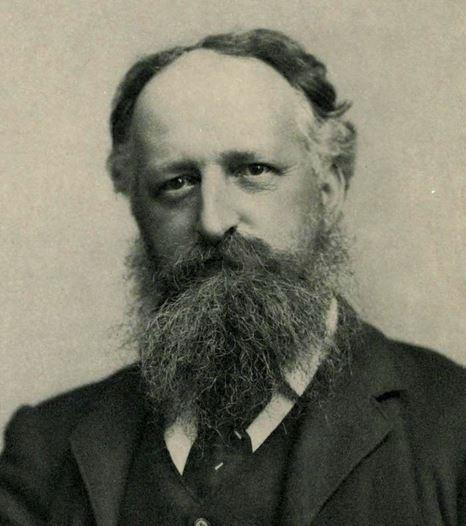
Francis Reginald Statham in later life

Francis Reginald Statham (1844–1908) was a writer, composer and newspaper editor of Great Britain and southern Africa. He was notable for his radical anti-imperialist writings and for the controversy that was attached to him throughout his life. The Bishop and political leader John Colenso famously summed him up as "a keen knife, liable to shut upon the hand that used it, and therefore to be used with caution".

== Early life and jail ==
Statham was born on 6 February 1844, in Everton, Liverpool. He was a sickly child and was mostly home-schooled. He then entered Liverpool's cotton industry, at a time when the American Civil War was causing cotton speculation.

He stole a large amount of his company's money in 1865, claiming he was affected by an "over-balanced mind". He then fled to continental Europe, disguised as a Catholic priest, but nonetheless suspiciously accompanied by a female "dancer" companion. He was soon caught and sentenced to 18 months hard labour.

Unstable and hypersensitive, Statham wrote The Fiery Furnace (1895) about his mental state, and underwent a brief religious conversion during his time in jail. After a few months as a lay preacher, he gave it up to write poetry, and then became a newspaper editor to the Liverpool Albion.

== Writer and editor in South Africa ==
=== Natal Witness (1877-1879) ===
In 1877, he was invited to serve as editor to the Natal Witness, in southern Africa.

He was fiercely independent and highly controversial as editor. A radical liberal anti-imperialist, who sided with the Boers in the Anglo-Boer War and with the Zulus in the Anglo-Zulu War, he was deeply unpopular and even made enemies of some people who shared his liberal views. The imperial policy under Lord Carnarvon was to enforce a system of confederation onto the various states of southern Africa, including both colonies and independent states and preempting a feared "general and simultaneous rising of Kaffirdom against white civilization".

Statham famously summed up the local perception of Carnarvon's plan for the region:

He (Carnarvon) thought it no harm to adopt this machinery (Canadian Confederation System) just as it stood, even down to the numbering and arrangement of the sections and sub-sections, and present it to the astonished South Africans as a god to go before them. It was as if your tailor should say — "Here is a coat; I did not make it, but I stole it ready-made out of a railway cloak-room, I don't know whether you want a coat or not; but you will be kind enough to put this on, and fit yourself to it. If it should happen to be too long in the sleeves, or ridiculously short in the back, I may be able to shift a button a few inches, and I am at least unalterably determined that my name shall be stamped on the loop you hang it up by."

Statham's attacks on the imperial policy became so severe that they brought on fears for the owner of the newspaper, which led him eventually to clash with Statham.

=== Cape Post (1879-1880) ===
In December 1879, he resigned and moved to the Cape Colony, to become editor to the newly founded radically liberal Cape Post newspaper of Patrick McLoughlin. This newspaper had been founded, with the support of leaders such as John X. Merriman, John Molteno and Charles Fairbridge, in order to counter the belligerent and expansionist mood of the time, and to encourage spontaneous unity in southern Africa (as opposed to an enforced confederation under outside control).

His paper quickly became controversial during the notorious "Koegas affair" (1879–80). This concerned the murder of five San people (Bushmen) by farmers, near the northern frontier. In the subsequent murder trial, the farmers were acquitted, and the resulting outrage focused on Attorney General Thomas Upington. The Cape Argus and Cape Post accused Upington of deliberately allowing the trial to take place in a racist and hostile town that would be expected to acquit the murderers, due to prejudice and local influence. The culmination of the outrage was a public campaign, led by Saul Solomon, McLoughlin, Statham and others, accusing Upington and his colleagues of allowing white juries to acquit white murderers from murdering blacks. Upington then launched a series of libel suits against the protest leaders, which were partially successful.

His friendship with some of the leading liberal figures of the Cape, such as Saul Solomon of the Cape Argus, and support from powerful anti-imperialist leaders like Merriman and Molteno, altogether could not save the Cape Post from its own financial difficulties, and it was forced to close the following year in 1880. Statham bitterly blamed his Cape benefactors for having persuaded him to relinquish his Natal position without providing his editorship in the Cape with sufficient financial backing.

=== Natal Witness (1881-1887) ===
Returning to England briefly, he moderated his radical views and wrote Blacks, Boers and British: a Three-Cornered Problem (1881), attempting to appeal to the mainstream in advocating a compromise coming together of the three population groups.

The same year he was back in Natal again, where, once again, he assumed the editorship of the Natal Witness in 1881. Once again his writings were controversial, attacking the colonial establishment including the powerful Shepstone family, Sir Henry Bulwer, and Garnet Wolseley's settlement in Zululand.

His writings caught the attention of the London Colonial Office which found itself repeatedly embarrassed by Statham's reports. Evelyn Ashley, the under-Secretary for colonies, resolved to dispose of the man his office dubbed "that pestilent journalist".

In 1887, Statham's criminal past was revealed and made public by the Colonial Office, which even presented it in the House of Commons, causing Statham severe repercussions and immense difficulties. These were compounded by a libel suit that was filed against him by the Colonial Office, for his writings. He then lost a libel suit from J.W. Shepstone. He resigned as editor on 31 August 1887 intending to go to England to clear his name.

=== Natal Advertiser (1888-1890) ===
After another brief spell in England and a failed attempt to reinstate himself and his reputation there, he returned again to southern Africa and served as editor to the Natal Advertiser, which was based in Durban. Here he attacked the new "British South Africa company" which he saw as simply a new vehicle of imperialism in southern Africa.

In 1889, Statham's predictions of the situation in that year - printed a decade earlier in 1879 - were unearthed and reprinted verbatim, due to their extraordinary accuracy.

=== The North (1890-1895) ===
Statham briefly moved to the Transvaal Republic where he edited the Transvaal Observer (1890-1891), and afterwards The Independent in Kimberley (1891–93). He had in fact been attracted to The Independent due to its name, but he quickly found out that it was in fact committed to a pro-Rhodes policy. The Star in Johannesburg offered him an editorship position, but he refused due to its pro-Rhodes agenda, preferring unemployment to endorsing an ideology he hated. For the next few years he subsisted on occasional income from articles he wrote, and lived in poverty.

== Writings in Europe (1895-1899) ==
Statham returned to Europe in 1895, as representative of the Transvaal Republic, and served as the republic's press attaché in London. His writings were intent on refuting the propaganda which was filling the British press at the time with regards to the South African situation. He prophesied that the Jameson Raid would be followed by a renewed imperial attempt to incorporate the Boer republics. His propaganda work during the Boer war led to trouble with the police again, this time as a spy, as he was followed and his mail watched.

At this time, he wrote the fiery political books Mr Magnus (1896), South Africa as It Is (1897), Paul Kruger and his Times (1898) and The South African Crisis: the Truth about the Transvaal (1899), in which he attacked Cecil Rhodes, De Beers, and the chartered British South Africa Company (BSAC).

The British government's granting of the BSAC's royal charter to occupy and administer what became Rhodesia was, Statham wrote, "the most extraordinary usurpation of power ever perpetrated, since the Popes gave over the Peruvians into the hands of Pizarro".

== Later life ==
In later life he tried to work as a music professor and composed several music pieces, such as South African National Songs, While Table Mountain Stands (his proposed national anthem for the Cape Colony), Volkslied (anthem for the Transvaal). In addition to his anthems for the various states of southern Africa, he composed Komt broeders komt! as a proposed anthem for a united South Africa. He died of kidney failure in Surrey in March 1908.
