= Koegas atrocities =

Murder case in Cape Colony, South Africa

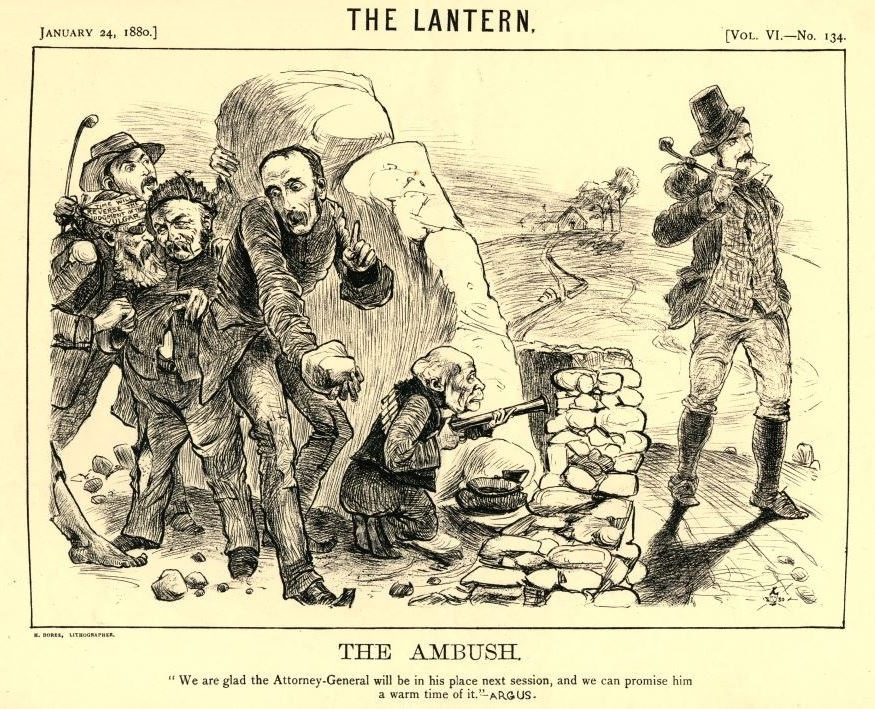
Cartoon by the reactionary Lantern newspaper, depicting the political fall-out of the Koegas affair. The Liberal leaders are portrayed as jocular scoundrels attacking the upright Attorney General T. Upington.

The Koegas atrocities or Koegas affair (1878–80) was a notorious murder case in the Cape Colony, which led to deep political divisions and a follow-up campaign, due to the perceived racial bias of the country's Attorney General. It culminated in libel suits, filed by the government against several liberal leaders and news outlets.

== Background ==
In 1878 the Cape Colony was going through a period of enormous strife and conflict, due mainly to the enforcement of a Confederation model onto the various states of southern Africa by the Colonial Office. This had involved the overthrow of the Cape's liberal first government, and the setting up of a pro-imperialist puppet-government under Prime Minister Gordon Sprigg. Under the direction of the Colonial Office, this new administration had embarked on a series of expansionist frontier wars. There was a concurrent movement away from political and social inclusiveness and public feeling in the war environment became considerably more hostile to perceived "outsiders". The liberal remnants of the previous government were very much on the defensive.

Against this backdrop, a low-scale conflict was underway all along the Orange River. This involved war between two tribes, the Koranas and the Bastaards, but on a larger scale was directed by the Cape in order to secure its northern frontier.

== The murder (1878) ==
The actual atrocities were inflicted in the Northern Cape, at Luisdraai near Koegas (roughly within the modern Siyathemba Local Municipality). In October 1878, a group of Korana and San indigenous people were savagely attacked by a 'military patrol' and 46 were killed. It later came to light that the indigenous people were killed in cold blood, after being disarmed and taken prisoner, eleven of the slain were women and children. The perpetrators were mounted militia, consisting of several white and Griqua farmers.

== The trial for the Koegas murders (1879) ==
The trial of five members of the military patrol, for wilful murder, took place the following year at the circuit court in Victoria West. The trial took place in a deeply conservative town, where many of the commandos had initially been raised. Therefore, in September 1879, in spite of enormous evidence, the jury found all four of the white militiamen to be not-guilty, and only Zoutaar, the black militiaman, to be guilty (and then only of "assault"). The verdict was received with cheers from the local townsfolk, however an immediate uproar resulted across the Cape Colony as the trial was roundly accused of being a massive miscarriage of justice. The judge himself (Justice Dwyer) angrily wrote to the powerful Cape Town MP and newspaper proprietor Saul Solomon, asking him to take up and publicise the matter.

== Liberal reaction (1879) ==
It was widely believed that a racist jury had acquitted the accused simply because they were predominantly white. Indignation focused on the Cape's Attorney General (and Minister of Justice) Thomas Upington, for allowing the trial to take place in a racist and hostile environment. Present at the time, he had in fact been officially warned about the strong partisan feeling of the town and its local jury, before the verdict, but had refused to move the trial.

From early October 1879, a campaign began in Cape Town, led by Saul Solomon and Francis Joseph Dormer of the Cape Argus, soon joined by Francis Statham and Patrick McLoughlin of the Cape Post. Other vocal leaders of the campaign were the MP John X. Merriman and Rev David P. Faure—who had even been present at the original trial, though just as an interpreter.

The campaign accused the Attorney General and his colleagues of allowing white juries to acquit whites who had killed blacks. Its leaders called for the Attorney General's resignation and for an all-round condemnation of the verdict. The campaign dominated the newspapers of the Cape, for the duration of this period, and deeply divided the country between liberal and reactionary.

== The "Fiat Justitia" trial (1879-80) ==
Attorney General Upington fought back, when he sued Saul Solomon and Dormer for libel, relating to pieces written by Dormer, but under Solomon's aegis. In particular, the Argus had published a letter, attacking the trial, signed "Fiat Justitia" ("May there be justice"), which formed the main point of Upington's attack. ("Fiat Justitia" turned out to have been David P. Faure himself, who had his career as a court interpreter terminated as a result.)

The libel trial (popularly known as the "Fiat Justitia trial") was held in Cape Town, before two judges - Sir Henry De Villiers and Sir Andries Stockenstrom. Enormous public attention focused on the trial, and a high level of public emotion resulted.

The judges publicly concluded that "the most gruesome atrocities had been committed against defenceless prisoners" and local prejudice had indeed caused the miscarriage of justice in the ensuing circuit court. The statement also concluded that the Attorney-General was indeed gravely at fault, and that it was undesirable for him to continue to hold political office.

However, in their verdict on the specific crime of the trial, that of libel, they concluded that one of the articles had gone too far, and that attacks on the Attorney General were valid and permitted, but should be grounded in facts and not in blind emotion. Saul Solomon was therefore told to pay a symbolic fine (1 shilling). The ruling concluded with a warning on the country's future direction if faults in its legal system were not addressed: "It amounts then to this, that the pure streams of justice have been polluted at their fount, and the question we have now to ask is whether the country is content to drink longer of these unwholesome waters."

While the verdict was undoubtedly intended to heal a divide and appease both parties, it was nonetheless controversial and caused both parties to feel that the matter had not been resolved.
