= James Weston Leonard =

James Leonard QC
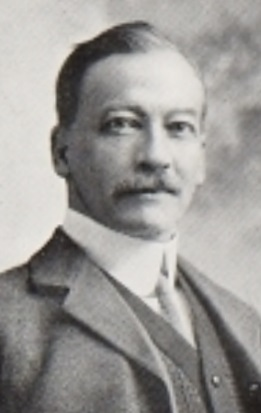

Attorney-General of the Cape Colony
- In office Jul 1882 – May 1884
- Prime Minister: Thomas Scanlen
- Preceded by: Thomas Scanlen
- Succeeded by: Thomas Upington
- In office Jan 1881 – May 1881
- Prime Minister: Gordon Sprigg
- Preceded by: Thomas Upington
- Succeeded by: Thomas Scanlen

Parliament of Cape Colony
- In office 1879–1988

Personal details
- Born: James Weston Leonard; 20 April 1853 Somerset East, Cape Colony
- Died: 3 September 1909 (aged 56) Brussels, Belgium
- Profession: Barrister-at-law

James Weston Leonard (20 April 1853 – 3 September 1909) was an influential politician of South Africa and Attorney-General of the Cape Colony.

== Early life and education ==
Leonard was born in Somerset East and received his schooling at Gill College. He studied law at the University of Cape Town, graduating with an LL.B. in 1876.

== Career ==
In the same year that he obtained his degree, he became a member of the Cape Bar and practised at the Cape until 1888.

He served as Member of the Cape Legislative Assembly for Oudtshoorn (1880–88) and served as Attorney General in the governments of Cape Prime Ministers, Gordon Sprigg in 1881 and Thomas Scanlen from 1882 until 1884. In 1883, at the age of thirty, he received the status of QC.

After the discovery of gold he settled in Johannesburg and from 1888 he practised at the Johannesburg Bar and was implicated in the Jameson Raid of 1895–6. In 1899 he moved to London.
