= Jan Hendrik Hofmeyr (Onze Jan) =

South African politician

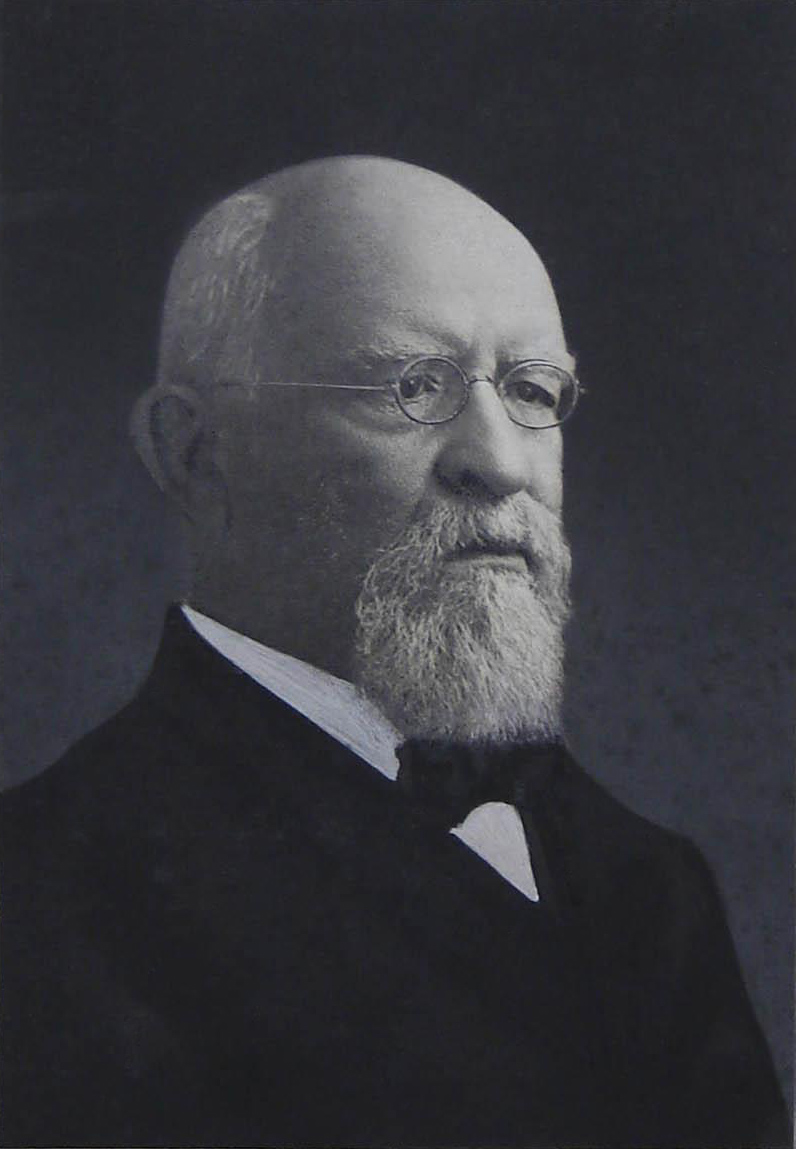

Minister without portfolio
- In office May 1881 – November 1881
- Monarch: Victoria
- Prime Minister: Thomas Charles Scanlen
- Governor: Hercules Robinson

Member of the Cape House of Assembly for Stellenbosch
- In office 1879 – 11 October 1909
- Monarchs: Victoria; Edward VII
- Prime Minister: Sir John Gordon Sprigg; Thomas Charles Scanlen; Thomas Upington; Sir John Gordon Sprigg; Cecil Rhodes; Sir John Gordon Sprigg; William Philip Schreiner; Sir John Gordon Sprigg; Leander Starr Jameson; John X. Merriman
- Governor: Sir William Gordon Cameron; Hercules Robinson; Sir William Howley Goodenough; Alfred Milner; Sir William Francis Butler; Sir Walter Hely-Hutchinson
- Constituency: Stellenbosch

Personal details
- Born: 4 July 1845 Cape Town, Cape Colony
- Died: 11 October 1909 (aged 64) Westminster, London, United Kingdom
- Resting place: Cape Town, Western Cape, South Africa
- Party: Afrikaner Bond
- Occupation: Politician
- Profession: Journalist
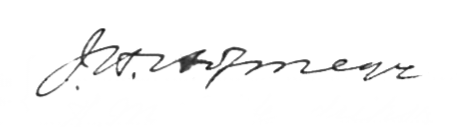
- Signature

Jan Hendrik Hofmeyr (4 July 1845 – 11 October 1909) was a politician in the Cape Colony. He was affectionately known as Onze Jan, "our Jan" in Dutch.

== Life ==
He was born in Cape Town, educated at the South African College, and at an early age turned his attention to politics, first as a journalist.

He was editor of de Zuid-Afrikaan until its incorporation with Ons Land, and of the Zuid Afrikaansche Tijdschrift. By birth, education and sympathies a typical Dutch Afrikaner, he set himself to organize the political power of his fellow-countrymen. This he did very effectively, and when in 1879 he entered the Cape parliament as member for Stellenbosch, he became the real leader of the Dutch party. Yet he only held office for six months – as minister without portfolio in the Scanlen ministry from May to November 1881. He held no subsequent official post in the colony, though he shared with Sir Thomas Upington and Sir Charles Mills the honor of representing the Cape at the intercolonial conference of 1887. Here he supported the proposal for entrusting the defence of Simon's Town to Cape Colony, leaving only the armament to be provided by the imperial government, opposed trans-oceanic penny postage and moved a resolution in favor of an imperial customs union. At the Colonial Conference of 1894 at Ottawa he was again one of the Cape representatives. In 1888 and in 1889, he was a member of the South African customs conference.

His chief importance as a public man was, however, derived from his power over the Dutch in Cape Colony, and his control of the Afrikaner Bond. But it remained an organization for obtaining the political supremacy of the Cape Dutch. His control over the Bond enabled him for many years, while free from the responsibilities of office, to make and unmake ministers at his will, and earned for him the name of Cabinet-maker of South Africa. His preference for working behind the scenes and avoiding overt political stands earned him another nickname, "the Mole" (described by John X Merriman as "an industrious little animal . . . You never see him at work, but every now and then a little mound of earth, thrown up here or there, will testify to his activities.")

Although officially the term Afrikander was explained by Hofmeyr to include white men of whatever race, yet in practice the influence of the Bond was always exerted in favor of the Dutch, and its power was drawn from the Dutch districts of Cape Colony. The sympathies of the Bond were thus always strongly with the Transvaal, as the chief centre of Dutch influence in South Africa; and Hofmeyr's position might in many respects be compared with that of Parnell at the head of the Irish Nationalist party in Great Britain. In the Bechuanaland difficulty of 1884 Hofmeyr threw all the influence of the Bond into the scale in favor of the Transvaal. But in the course of the next few years he began to drift away from President Kruger. He resented the reckless disregard of Cape interests involved in Kruger's fiscal policy; he feared that the Transvaal, after its sudden leap into prosperity upon the gold discoveries of 1886, might overshadow all other Dutch influences in South Africa; above all he was convinced, as he showed by his action at the London conference, that the protection of the British navy was indispensable to South Africa, and he set his face against Kruger's intrigues with Germany, and his avowed intention of acquiring an outlet to the sea in order to get into touch with foreign powers.

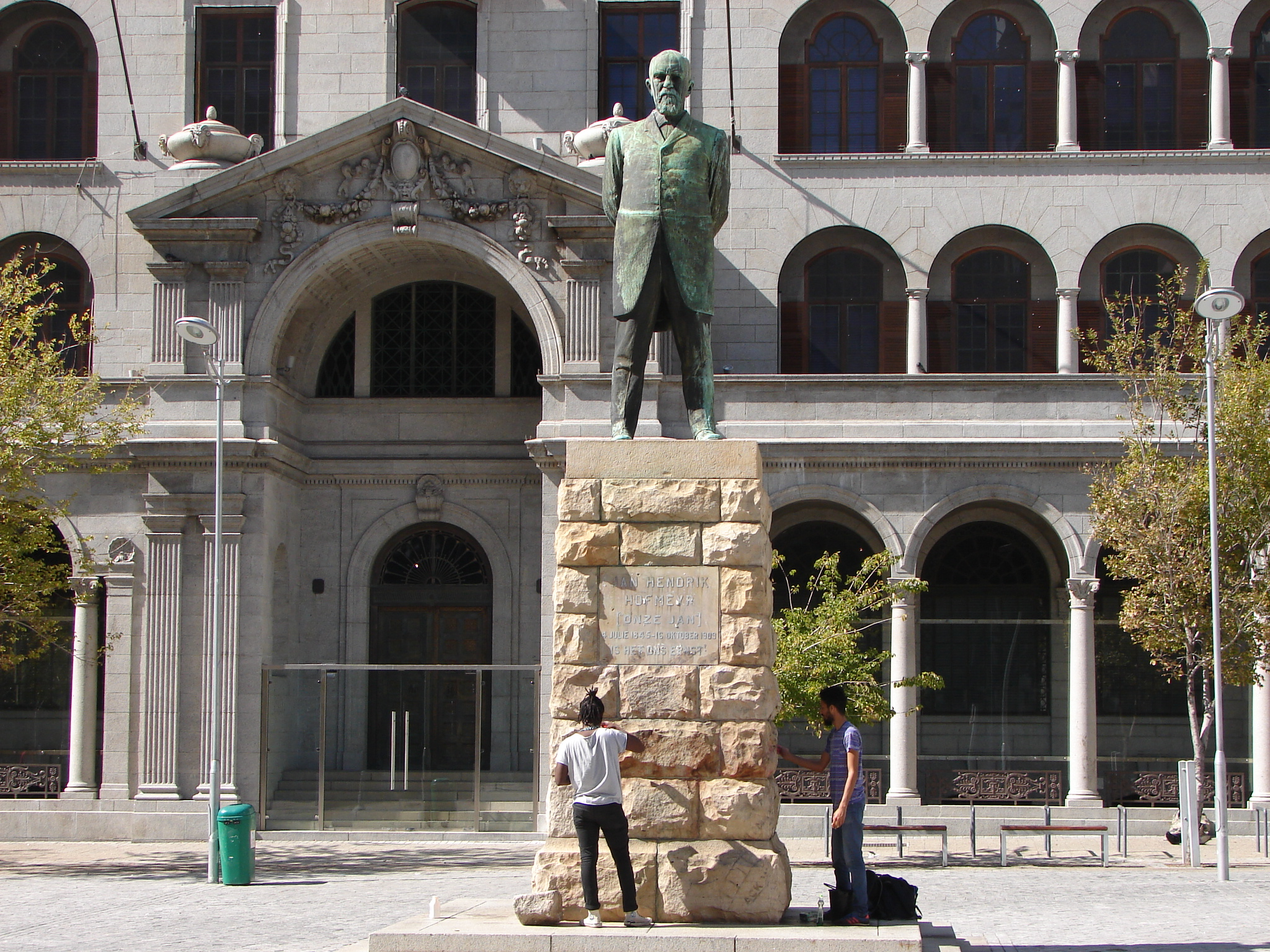
Statue of J.H. Hofmeyr on Church Square, Cape Town

In 1890, Hofmeyr joined forces with Cecil Rhodes, who became premier of Cape Colony with the support of the Bond. Hofmeyr's influence was a powerful factor in the conclusion of the Swaziland convention of 1890, as well as in stopping the trek to Banyailand (Rhodesia) in 1891, a notable reversal of the policy he had pursued seven years before. But the reactionary elements in the Bond grew alarmed at Rhodes's imperialism, and in 1895 Hofmeyr resigned his seat in parliament and the presidency of the Bond. Then came the Jameson Raid, and in its wake there rolled over South Africa a wave of Dutch and anti-British feeling such as had not been known since the days of Majuba. (The proclamation issued by Sir Hercules Robinson disavowing Jameson was suggested by Hofmeyr, who helped to draw up its terms.) Once more Hofmeyr became president of the Bond. By an alteration of the provincial constitution, all power in the Cape branch of the Bond was vested in the hands of a vigilance committee of three, of whom Hofmeyr and his brother were two. As the recognized leader of the Cape Dutch, he protested against such abuses as the dynamite monopoly in the Transvaal, and urged Kruger even at the eleventh hour to grant reasonable concessions rather than plunge into a war that might involve Cape Afrikanderdom and the Transvaal in a common ruin. In July 1899, he journeyed to Pretoria, and vainly supported the proposal of a satisfactory franchise law, combined with a limited representation of the Uitlanders in the Volksraad, and in September urged the Transvaal to accede to the proposed joint inquiry.

He died in London on 11 October 1909.

== Family ==
Hofmeyr married Aleda Hendrikz in 1880; she died 1883. He married her sister, Johanna Hendrikz on 1 September 1900.

== See also ==
- Parliament of the Cape of Good Hope

== Books ==
- Hofmeyr, J.H. (1913). THE LIFE OF JAN HENDRIK HOFMEYR (Onze Jan). Cape Town: Van De Sante De Villiers.
