= Church Square =

Church Square may refer to:

- Church Square, Pretoria, South Africa
- Church Square (Cape Town), South Africa
- Church Square (Columbus, Georgia), United States
