= Church Square (Cape Town) =

Square in Cape Town

Church Square in Cape Town, South Africa, lies in front of the Groote Kerk at the intersection of Parliament and Spin Streets. It currently features a park.

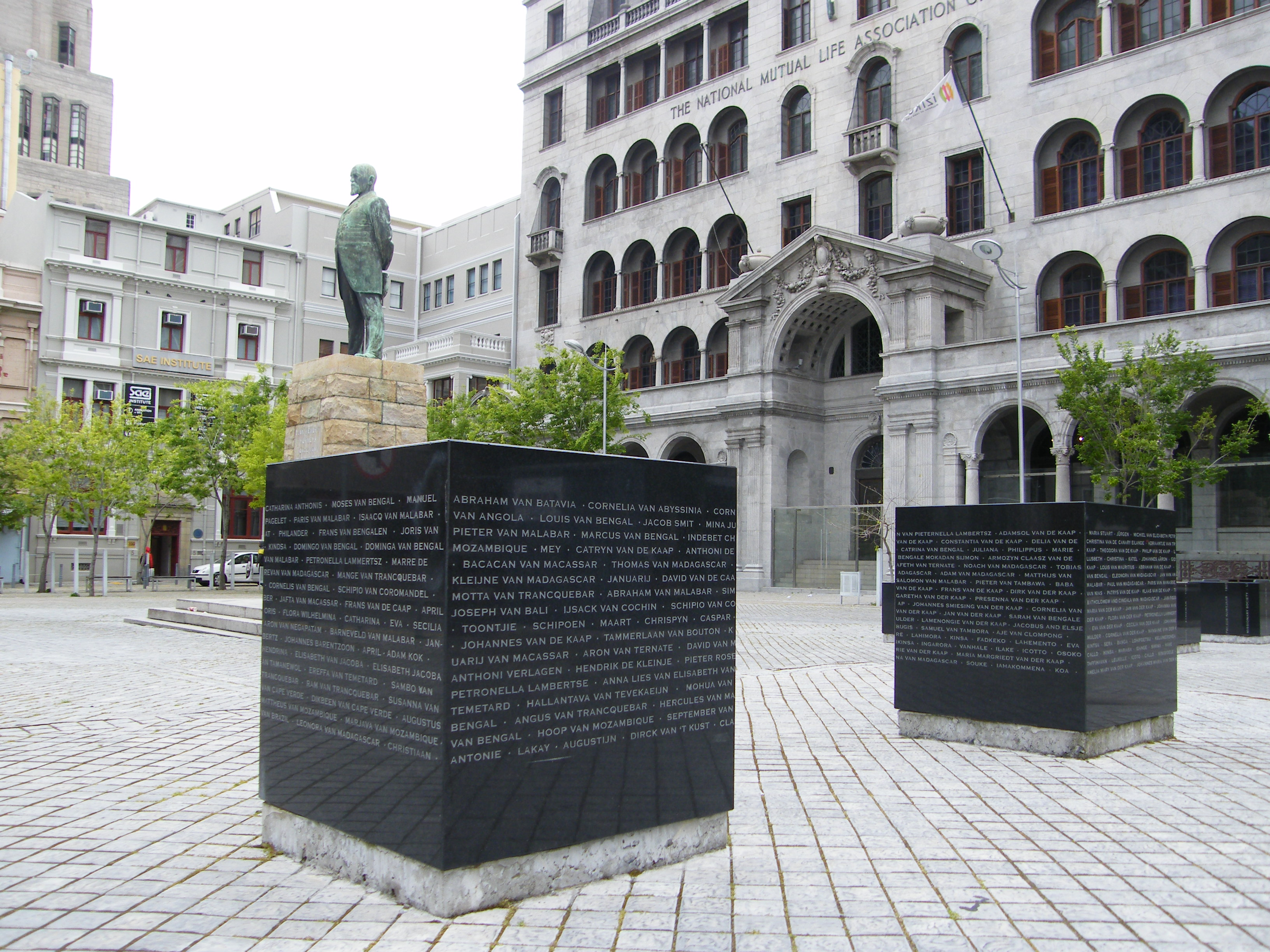
Statue of Jan Hendrik Hofmeyr (Onze Jan) and remembrance columns on Church Square, Cape Town

In the middle of the square lies a statue of Jan Hendrik Hofmeyr (Onze Jan). The name Spin Street comes from a silk–spinning factory between Plein Street and Parliament Street, that was operating for a short time. A plaque on a traffic island on Spin Street commemorates the slave market once using the square. A building south of the square housed the old slave quarters and later was home to the High Court. Today, it houses a cultural and historical museum. In 1961, the square was declared a heritage site.

== Bibliography ==
- Oberholster, J.J. Die historiese monumente van Suid-Afrika. Cape Town: Kultuurstigting Rembrandt van Rijn vir die Raad vir Nasionale Gedenkwaardighede, 1972. ISBN 0-620-00191-7
