= Afrikaner Bond =

Political party in 19th century southern Africa

The Afrikaner Bond (Afrikaans and Dutch for "Afrikaner Union"; South African Dutch: Afrikander Bond) was founded as an anti-imperialist political party in 19th century southern Africa. While its origins were largely in the Orange Free State, it came to have a significant presence across the region, and especially in the Cape Colony and the Transvaal.

The Afrikaner Bond was distinct from the later Afrikaner Broederbond which, while similarly named, was a secret cultural organisation formed in 1918, not a political party.

== Formation and parent organisations ==
The original Afrikaner Bond was formed by the union in 1881 of the Genootskap van Regte Afrikaners (Society of True Afrikaners) of Rev S.J. du Toit, and the Zuidafrikaansche Boeren Beschermings Vereeniging (South African Farmers' Protection Association) of Jan Hendrik Hofmeyr.

Instrumental in this union and the resultant establishment of the Bond party across southern Africa was a German named Borckenhagen who lived in Bloemfontein. Borckenhagen in turn influenced an Afrikaner named Reitz, who afterwards became the state secretary of the Transvaal.

== Ideology ==
As stated by Borckenhagen, the Afrikaner Bond was established for "the States of South Africa to be federated in one independent republic". However the Cape Colony branch of the bond was less extreme in its republicanism and more inclined to cohabit with an imperial policy of indirect rule.

The Afrikaner Bond, as established in 1881, claimed to represent all those who considered Africa to be their home, rather than Europe. These so-defined "Afrikanders" were predominantly white farmers of Dutch extraction, though the initial bond was explicitly defined as a non-racial organisation, open to people of all races. Its stated aim was to advance "Afrikander" interests from the Cape to the Limpopo River.

== Governance in the Cape ==
Although frequently having a majority in the Cape Parliament, it never governed directly, generally forming coalitions with English-speaking politicians. These included the Thomas Scanlen ministry, the administration of Cecil John Rhodes with which it split after the Jameson Raid and John X. Merriman, the last Prime Minister of the Cape Colony, 1908–1910, prior to the formation of the Union of South Africa on 31 May 1910. After Union, it ceased to be an independent party, merging with the South African Party of the Cape, Het Volk of the Transvaal and Orangia Unie of the Orange Free State to form a new Union-wide South African Party.

In 1882 it was able to have Dutch recognised as an official language of the Cape Colony.
