= Cape Argus =

Newspaper from Cape Town, South Africa

The Cape Argus

- The Cape Argus front page of 21 July 2009
- Type: Daily newspaper
- Format: Compact
- Owner: Independent News and Media SA
- Editor: Taariq Halim
- Founded: 1857
- Headquarters: Newspaper House, Cape Town, South Africa
- Sister newspapers: Cape Times
- Website: www.capeargus.co.za

The Cape Argus is a daily newspaper co-founded in 1857 by Saul Solomon and published by Sekunjalo in Cape Town, South Africa. It is commonly referred to as The Argus.

Although not the first English-language newspaper in South Africa, the Cape Argus was the first locally to use the telegraph for news gathering.

As of 2012, the Argus had a daily readership of 294 000, according to the South African Advertising Research Foundation's All Media Products Survey (Amps) Newspaper Readership and Trends. Its circulation for the first quarter of 2013 was 33247.

Jermaine Craig is the executive editor of the Cape Argus. He replaced Gasant Abarder, who resigned in early 2013 to take up a post at Primedia in the Western Cape.

== History ==
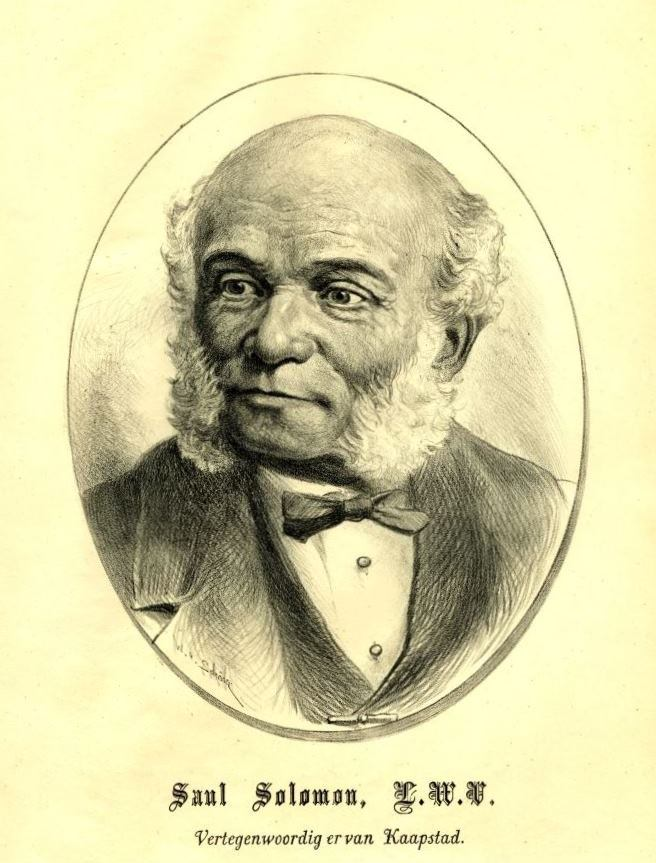
Saul Solomon, liberal parliamentarian and founder of the Cape Argus

The Cape Argus was founded on 3 January 1857, by the partners Saul Solomon, journalist Richard William Murray ("Limner") and the MP Bryan Henry Darnell. However, political differences immediately surfaced among the partners. Saul Solomon was a radical supporter of multi-racial democracy, women's rights and the local "responsible government" movement; while his two partners were virulently pro-imperialist. As the Responsible Government movement grew in the Cape, the reactionary and pro-British views of Murray and Darnell became increasingly unpopular and alienated the Cape Argus readership. Saul Solomon, as MP for Cape Town, had also become the most powerful figure in the new Cape Parliament. Eventually, in 1859–62, Murray and Darnell sold their remaining shares and departed for the Transvaal.

Saul Solomon, now the sole owner of the Cape Argus from 1863, through Saul Solomon & Co., threw the newspaper entirely behind responsible government and support for non-racialism. He was immensely influential in building and shaping the company, which quickly became the leading newspaper of the Cape, overtaking the "Commercial Advertiser" of John Fairbairn.

During this time, the Argus and Solomon's printing works served as the official government printing contractor. It was responsible for the Government Gazette, but also took on the parliamentary and stationery contracts. This was principally because it was the only printing company at the time which had the resources and management to reliably fulfill these contracts. It expanded considerably to 200 employees, 8 manual presses and 10 steam-powered presses by 1878.

The Argus editor (from 1864 until 1872) Sir Thomas Ekins Fuller was replaced by Professor Roderick Noble (1872-1875) from Inverness - English & Science Professor of the South African College and previously the editor of the declining Commercial Advertiser. Professor Noble, who was also the co-editor of the well-known Cape Monthly Magazine, died suddenly in 1875, and Solomon replaced him with the radical liberal Irishman Patrick McLoughlin. While popular with the locally elected Cape government, McLoughlin angered the British authorities with his anti-imperialist views.

Francis Joseph Dormer took over as editor in 1878. At the same time, a change in the political direction of the Cape began to cause significant problems for the Argus. A British intervention in the Cape led to a new and dubiously-appointed government, under a puppet Prime Minister, Gordon Sprigg. The racist and expansionist policies of the new government (and incidents such as the Koegas atrocities) came under severe criticism from the Argus. In retaliation for the criticism, Sprigg's government cancelled all printing contracts with the Argus, awarding them instead to political allies from Grahamstown (who charged several times the price, and consistently failed to deliver the work).

In later life, Solomon gradually withdrew from the daily running of the Argus. In 1880, he retired completely, after the tragic drowning of his 5-year-old daughter, which caused a collapse in his health. When his sons then mismanaged the business, Solomon took back the beleaguered company and sold it to his editor Dormer in 1881 (though Solomon continued the actual printing work for him). Dormer then formed the Argus Printing and Publishing Company from it in 1886, when he acquired the remainder of Solomon's printing works and began printing himself. Edmund Powell (who had been sub-editor since Dormer took over in 1878) became editor in 1889 and remained so until 1907.

In December 1969, the paper was renamed The Argus, however the change was unpopular and the name was reverted to The Cape Argus. True to its roots in Saul Solomon's liberalism, the paper was a prominent voice of opposition against the dominant National Party during the Apartheid years.

In August 2013, Sekunjalo purchased Independent News and Media SA from Independent News and Media. Not long after, editor Chris Whitfield took early retirement, a decision blamed on editorial interference by the new ownership.

== Supplements ==
- Tonight (Mon–Fri)
- Workplace (Wed)

== Distribution areas ==
Distribution
	2008	2013
Eastern Cape	Y	Y
Free State		
Gauteng		
Kwa-Zulu Natal		
Limpopo		
Mpumalanga		
North West		
Northern Cape		
Western Cape	Y	Y

== Distribution figures ==
Circulation
	Net Sales
Jan - Mar 2015	30 393
Apr - Jun 2014	29 170
Jan - Mar 2014	30 319
Oct - Dec 2012	32 337
Jul - Sep 2012	33 006
Apr - Jun 2012	35 332
Jan - Mar 2012	40 243

== Readership figures ==
Estimated Readership
	AIR
January – December 2012	294 000
July 2011 – June 2012	288 000

== See also ==
- List of newspapers in South Africa
