= Saul Solomon =

Cape Colony politician (1817–1892)

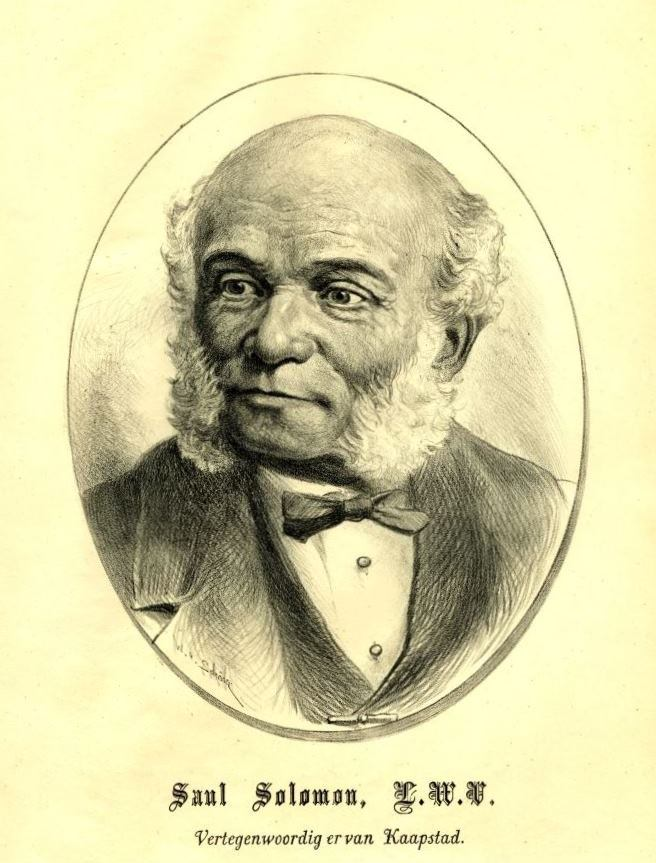
- Saul Solomon. Member of Parliament for Cape Town
- Born: 25 May 1817; St Helena
- Died: 16 October 1892 (aged 75); Kilcreggan, Scotland
- Spouse: Georgiana Solomon
- Children: 6 (including Daisy Solomon and Saul Solomon

Saul Solomon (25 May 1817 – 16 October 1892) was an influential liberal politician of the Cape Colony, a British colony in what is now South Africa. Solomon was an important member of the movement for responsible government and an opponent of Lord Carnarvon's Confederation scheme.

== Early life and background ==
Saul Solomon was born on the island of St Helena on 25 May 1817. Although his family were St Helenan, they had close links to Cape Town. Saul spent his first years at a Jewish children's home in England, where he suffered from the malnutrition and rickets that physically affected him for the rest of his life. He then had a rudimentary formal education in South Africa before beginning work as an apprentice in a printing business. He later acquired the business and built it into the largest printing business in the country, founding the Cape Argus newspaper. He was also one of the founders of Old Mutual, today one of the largest insurance firms in South Africa.

As representative for Cape Town, Solomon entered the very first Parliament of the Cape of Good Hope (Cape Parliament) when it opened in 1854. He remained an MP for this constituency until his retirement in 1883.

== Political career (1854–1883) ==
Saul Solomon's original election promise had been "to give my decided opposition to all legislation tending to introduce distinctions either of class, colour or creed". Throughout his political career he strictly adhered to this manifesto – repeatedly turning down both cabinet and ministerial posts so as to be free to vote according to his beliefs.

Although he was from a Jewish background and even funded the establishment of the Cape's first synagogue in 1849, Solomon was openly secular in outlook, declaring himself to be "a liberal in politics and a voluntary in religion". In the first Cape parliament in 1854, he presented his "Voluntary bill" (intended to end government subsidies to churches, and to ensure equal treatment of all beliefs) but it was turned down. He proceeded to put it to parliament every year, only for it to be repeatedly rejected, until it was finally passed under the Molteno government in 1875.

=== The Responsible Government Movement (1854–1872) ===
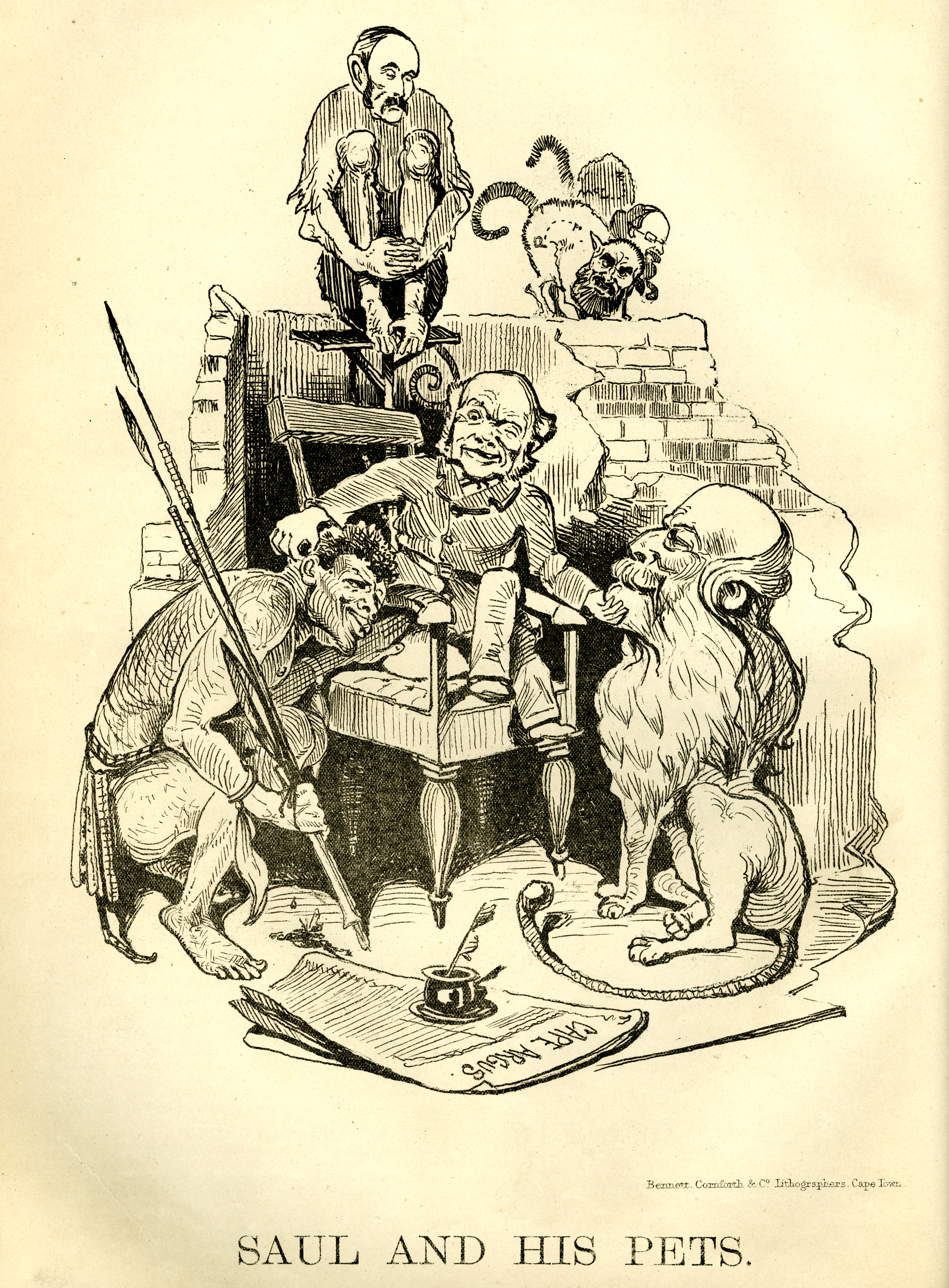
Reactionary cartoon depicting Saul Solomon with the prominent anti-imperialist leaders of southern Africa as his "pets". The pets shown are Zulu King Cetshwayo, the Beaufort lion John Molteno (Cape Prime Minister), and John X Merriman (shown as a monkey).

Solomon joined the movement for responsible government in the Cape and helped to institute it when it was established in 1872. The leader of the responsible government movement, Prime Minister John Charles Molteno, was a friend and admirer. The two men were both businessmen from poor immigrant backgrounds who had outlooks that were relatively liberal for the times and saw eye-to-eye on a number of issues. According to Saul Solomon's official biography, Molteno only accepted the office of Prime Minister after insisting that it first be offered to Solomon, who turned it down however due to his delicate health. Solomon supported the Molteno Ministry, though he refused offers of cabinet positions so as to be able to oppose the government if and when his conscience required it. One supporter told Parliament that "Molteno would not hold a Ministry together for one week if Mr Solomon was in it; and no cabinet could do without him."

=== Eastern Cape Separatist League (1854–1874) ===
The eastern part of the Cape Colony had a long-running separatist movement, consisting of a portion of white settlers (the "Easterners"), led by parliamentarian John Paterson of Port Elizabeth, who resented the rule of the Cape Town parliament and wanted stricter labour laws to encourage the Xhosa to leave their lands and work on the settlers' plantations.

In accordance with his stated policy that "natives should be allowed to sell their labour as they desired, and that no semblance of coercion should be employed to provide labour for the farmer" and because he detested the Easterners' white supremacist views, Solomon took a strong stance against the separatist movement and for a united, multi-racial Cape.

When he was addressing parliament about the need to enforce the principles of racial equality that the Cape's constitution called for, the Separatist representatives all stood up and walked out on him. He reportedly declared: "I would rather address empty benches than empty minds!"

In parliament he went on to lead the "Westerners", who backed the Molteno–Merriman government in successfully crushing the separatist league. Separatist parliamentarians branded him a "negrophile" – an intended insult that he in fact accepted with considerable pride, and he went on to push even further for social reform (for example repealing the discriminatory Contagious Diseases Act).

=== The imposition of Confederation (1874–1878) ===
Starting in 1874, the British Secretary of State for the Colonies, Lord Carnarvon, having federated Canada, began an ill-fated plan to impose the same system of confederation on the very different states of southern Africa.

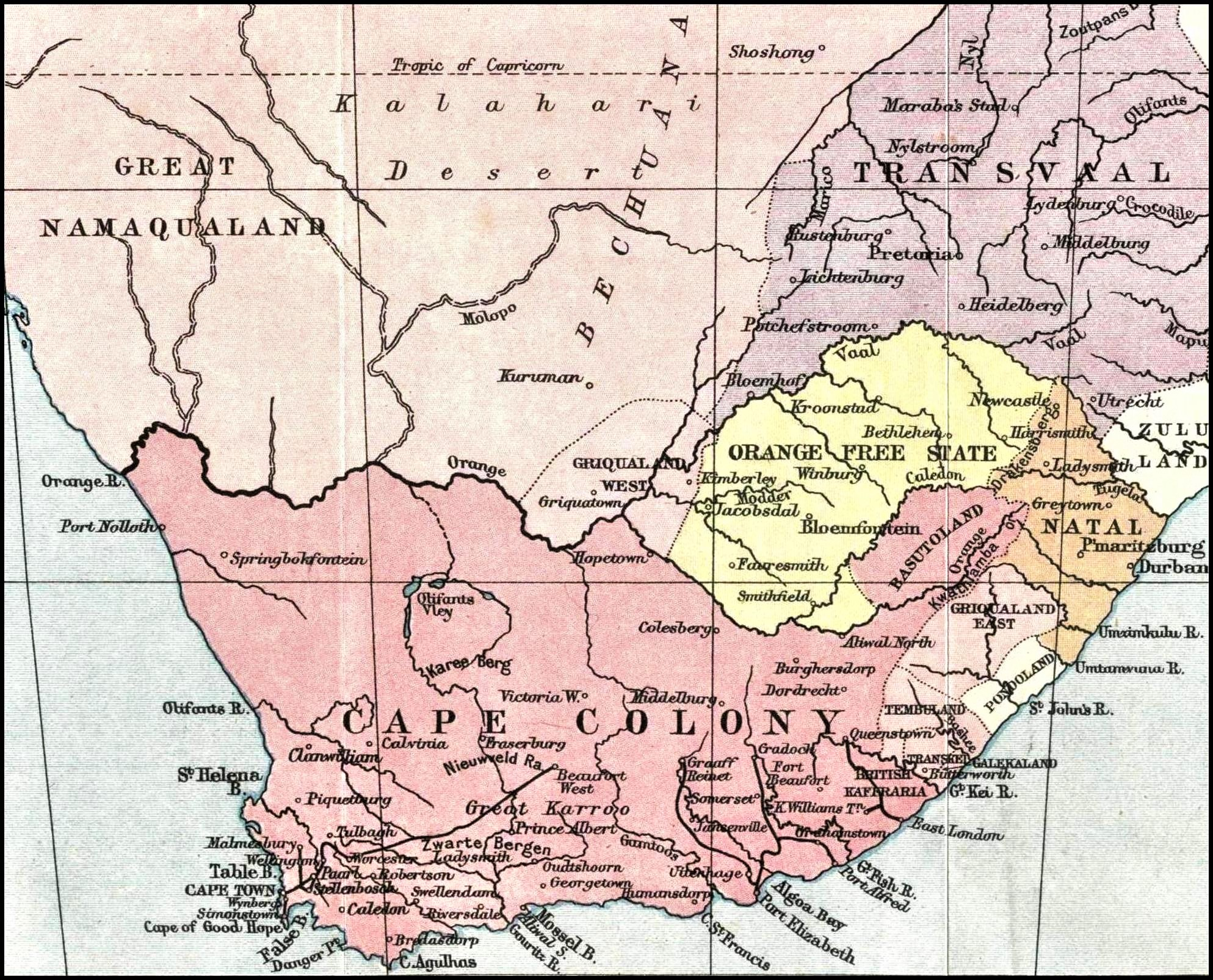
The Cape Colony in 1878, on the eve of the Confederation wars

Although earlier in his career Solomon had been in favour of a form of federated "United States of Southern Africa", he shared with the Cape government concerns about the form and timing of Carnarvon's confederation project. Of particular concern to many liberal politicians were the repressive "native policies" of Natal and the Boer republics (which would have affected the rights of many Cape citizens). Saul Solomon joined the Cape government in arguing that the Cape's multi-racial constitution might not survive a session of bargaining with the Boer republics. Another issue was the fact that some neighbouring states, such as Zululand and the Transvaal Republic, would require military invasion to be incorporated into the confederation. Consequently, Solomon opposed Carnarvon's proposal and the "new and impatient imperialism" which motivated it.

As an alternative, Solomon proposed a looser system of federation, whereby the Cape could preserve its multi-racial franchise. Another proposed alternative was the "Molteno Plan" of the Cape Government, which advocated complete union instead of confederation, but with the Cape's constitution (including the multi-racial franchise) extended and imposed on the other states of southern Africa. Both suggestions were ignored by the Colonial Office and over the next few years Carnarvon's disastrous confederation scheme unravelled as predicted, eventually resulting the outbreak of several destructive conflicts across the region.

=== The Sprigg Government (1878–1881) ===
To further the Confederation scheme, Sir Henry Bartle Frere appointed a new and more compliant government, under the puppet Prime Minister Gordon Sprigg. Against the backdrop of the wider "Confederation wars" that now swept southern Africa, Sprigg began to institute a more discriminatory policy towards the Cape's Black African citizens, leading to revolts and further conflicts like the Basuto Gun War.

Although Saul Solomon had initially agreed to accept Sprigg's new government, its discriminatory policies immediately brought down his strongest criticism, which was voiced through his various media outlets. This culminated in his public campaign against the government for its role in the Koegas atrocities.

"No one, during the last three years at least, has been more abused in Cape Town, and South Africa at large, than Mr Saul Solomon. He has, for his earnest advocacy of native interests, had the most outrageous charges levelled against him..." "Yet he has neither flinched nor swerved, and brings the same guns to bear on his enemies again and again with the most unshaken pertinacity. He is a man to be reckoned with, a man to get upon your side. But if you get him on your side, it will not be by cajoling, or by indirect bribery, but by the pure weight of logic and of reason."

— A contemporary description of Saul Solomon by Francis Statham (1881)

Sprigg's retaliation was swift. He ordered a review and cancellation of all government contracts with the Argus and other businesses that were linked to Saul Solomon. These were all given to political allies (though without the equipment to fulfill them and at several times the price). Meanwhile, Sprigg's Attorney-General, Upington, launched a series of high-profile lawsuits (bordering on show trials) against Solomon himself.

==== The "Pro Bono Publico" trial (1878–79) ====
Solomon's editor, Patrick McLoughlin, had supposedly anonymously written several pieces criticising the Sprigg government and the British colonial establishment, the most infamous of which was entitled "Pro Bono Publico" ("For the Public Good"). A series of libel lawsuits were launched by the Sprigg government, ultimately targeting Solomon, whom it tried to link the pamphlets too.

Although it was never proven that McLoughlin even authored the pamphlets in question (and Solomon believed he had not), the trial and related pressures caused McLoughlin to resign (he shot himself a few years later). The Sprigg party failed however, to bring Solomon himself down.

==== The "Fiat Justitia" trial (1879–80) ====
The following year, Solomon's enemies had another opportunity. The Argus printed reports of racism and miscarriage of justice regarding the earlier trials for the Koegas murders, which had been sent to it signed "Fiat Justitia" ("May there be justice").

This generated another round of political trials. These attacked Solomon's new editor, Francis Dormer, for libel but again sought ultimately to damage Solomon himself. Once again the editor resigned, and once again Solomon survived, in spite of losing the trial. Crucially, he produced letters from the Koegas trial judge asking him to publish the information, and detailing the brutal violence of the murders and the racism which had prevented justice being done.

"Fiat Justitia" ultimately turned out to have been Mr D.P. Faure, who had served as the Koegas court interpreter. Faure was driven from his official career by the Sprigg government, but Solomon later sought out the unemployed Faure and gave him a token translator job with the Argus.

==== Aftermath ====
Solomon emerged from these attacks financially damaged, but largely victorious. The government, frantically cutting back on core infrastructure to avoid bankruptcy from its war expenses, became increasingly unpopular. When its British backers were recalled to London to face charges of misconduct, the Sprigg government fell.

== Personal details ==
Physically, Solomon was partially disabled. Childhood poverty and ill health, aggravated by a bout of rickets, had left him with badly stunted legs. When standing, this made him so short that he needed to stand on a chair to be seen when addressing Parliament. His physical condition was particularly drawn attention to by his very high-pitched voice, as well as by the frequent presence by his side of his friend and political ally Molteno, who was unusually tall, and the image of the two men together was a topic for caricature by the political cartoonists of the time.

Saul Solomon was nonetheless an eloquent and persuasive speaker with a skill for reasoned argument. His proposals were usually well researched and he characteristically spent long hours studying censuses and other government publications for the precise facts and figures that he believed should inform his opinions. Consequently, he was typically always able to back up his opinions with great quantities of evidence as well as with a clear application of logic. This earned him considerable respect, even from his political opponents. An example is the cautious and guarded homage which writer Stanley Little, a political opponent, later paid to Saul Solomon in his 1887 work on the Cape's political leadership:

The Honourable Saul Soloman[sic], whom I may call Molteno's ghost, is without doubt the ablest man South Africa has produced. Without his support few Ministers could hold office for long. He is the most remarkable statesman in the Cape. It is he who can pull the wires and bring Jack's house tumbling down about his ears whenever he likes. An able debater, a splendid fighter, an energetic, consistent, upright man, he deserves all honour and praise. He has led a life of steadfast consistency, and has conferred benefits upon the colony, which must earn for his name the unswerving veneration of generations of South Africans yet to come. He secured for the Cape the boon of representative institutions, he stimulated her energies in all matters educational, and that grand educational establishment, the South African College, is vastly his debtor. He has been ever foremost in making every effort to provide for suitable instruction for the people. As to his native policy, he thoroughly believes he is right there. He is animated by noble, generous impulses, but here, if I may make bold to say so, in criticising so great a man, I think his goodness of heart has somewhat thwarted the soundness of his judgment. His whole life has been devoted to preaching the doctrine of the equality of all races and classes. I believe this to be a fallacy, a bitter, mournful fallacy. The French encyclopaedists were all wrong, these ideas are utter nonsense.

— James Stanley Little, The Wisdom of Soloman, in South Africa: A Sketchbook of Men, Manners and Facts (1887) Swan, Sonnenschein, Lowrey & Co. London. pp.334-335

His progressive views on equal rights extended to gender relations (for his marriage ceremony he asked that his wife should not have to vow to "obey" him), religion (he never officially renounced his Judaism, but he abhorred sectarian attitudes and attended churches as often as synagogues) and class (he asked his employees and household servants to simply call him "Saul").

== Marriage, children, and later life ==
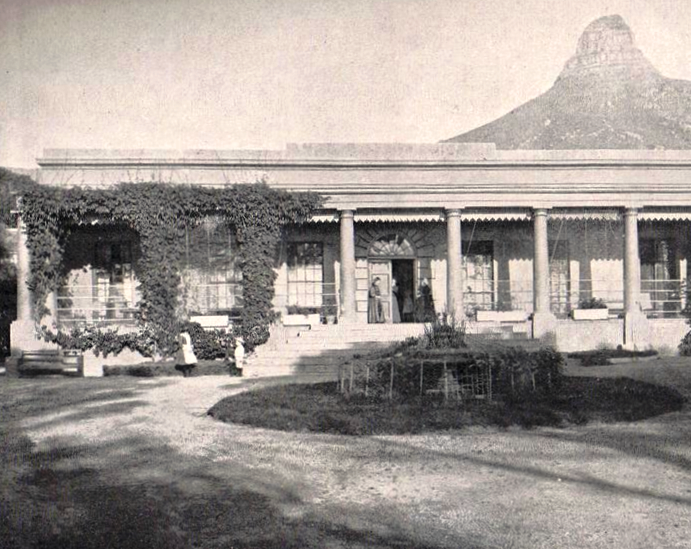
Clarensville House in Sea Point

In 1873 he met Georgiana Margaret Thomson, the inaugural headteacher of a girls' school in Cape Colony, now known as Good Hope Seminary High School. Their views tallied on many matters, not least girls' education: he owned a first edition of Mary Wollstonecraft's polemic A Vindication of the Rights of Woman. Despite his being almost twice her age, they married. The wedding, which took place on 21 March 1874 at his home, was to have had an alteration to the standard Anglican marriage vows: neither wife nor husband wished her to promise to obey him. However, the two clergymen officiating told the couple that this would render the ceremony without authority, so the words were included. One historian describes their marriage as "idyllic". The couple had six children.

He lived at Clarensville House in Sea Point, Cape Town for most of his life. He and Georgiana enjoyed welcoming guests as varied as Cetewayo, King of the Zulus, and the future British Emperors, Princes Edward and George.

In 1881 the eldest daughter drowned – as did the governess who tried to rescue the child. Solomon's health declined and he withdrew from public life, even handing his business over to his nephews. Saul retired from public life, and the family moved to Bedford in England in 1888, where their sons attended Bedford School. He retired from public life completely in 1883 due to poor health and moved to Kilcreggan, Scotland, in 1888. It was here that he died in 1892, of "Chronic tubular nephritis", leaving Georgiana with four children to raise.

Saul Solomon's extended family remained deeply involved in politics and law in southern Africa for many years – though they varied greatly in their political allegiance. In particular, his nephews Sir Richard Solomon and Edward Philip Solomon were very influential at the time of the Boer War and the lead up to the Union of South Africa; their brother William Henry Solomon became the Union's Chief Justice.

Solomon's wife Georgiana survived him by over 40 years, and was an influential suffragette. Of their three children who lived to adulthood, Daisy Solomon was also a suffragette, Hon. Saul Solomon was a high court judge (the Supreme Court of South Africa), and William Ewart Gladstone Solomon was a noted painter who followed his mother into educational leadership as principal of the Bombay School of Art.

== See also ==
- Freedom of religion in South Africa
- History of Cape Colony from 1870 to 1899

Political offices
Preceded by Office created	Representative of Cape Town; 1854–1868	Succeeded by William Porter, CMG
Preceded by ???	Representative of Cape Town; 1870–1883	Succeeded by ???
