= Thomas Upington =

The Right Honourable Sir Thomas Upington KCMG
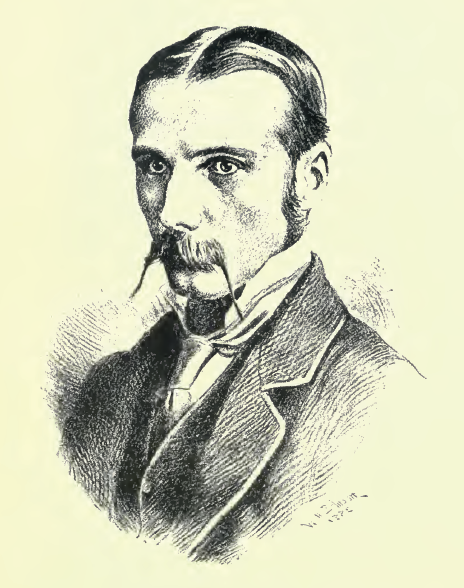
- Thomas Upington, from a portrait in Het Volksblad, 1883.

Prime Minister of the Cape Colony
- In office 13 May 1884 – 24 November 1886
- Monarch: Victoria
- Governor: Sir Leicester Smyth; Sir Henry D'Oyley Torrens; Henry Augustus Smyth
- Preceded by: Thomas Charles Scanlen
- Succeeded by: John Gordon Sprigg

Attorney-General of Cape Colony
- In office Jan 1896 – May 1898
- Prime Minister: Gordon Sprigg
- Preceded by: W P Schreiner
- Succeeded by: Thomas Graham
- In office May 1884 – Jul 1890
- Prime Minister: Gordon Sprigg
- Preceded by: James Leonard
- Succeeded by: James Rose Innes
- In office Feb 1878 – Jan 1881
- Prime Minister: Gordon Sprigg
- Preceded by: Andries Stockenström
- Succeeded by: James Leonard

Personal details
- Born: 28 October 1844 Mallow, County Cork; United Kingdom
- Died: 10 December 1898 (aged 54) Wynberg, Cape Town, Cape Colony
- Spouse: Mary Elizabeth Guerin
- Children: 2 sons, 3 daughters
- Education: Trinity College Dublin
- Occupation: Politician, lawyer

Sir Thomas Upington KCMG (1844–1898), born in Cork, Ireland, was an administrator and politician of the Cape Colony.

He was briefly Prime Minister of the Cape Colony, between 1884 and 1886, during a period of extreme turbulence in the Cape's history.

The town of Upington in the Northern Cape is named after him, as was the short-lived Boer republic of Upingtonia.

== Early life ==
Upington was born in Rathnee, near Mallow, County Cork, on 28 October 1844. He was educated at Cloyne Diocesan School, Mallow, and at Trinity College Dublin, where in 1863 he obtained Mathematical Honours in the Hilary term examinations.

He was called to the Irish Bar in 1867. In 1868 he became secretary to Thomas O'Hagan, 1st Baron O'Hagan, Lord Chancellor of Ireland, and in January 1870 he appeared as registrar to the court in Dr MacSwiney's appeal to the Visitors of the King and Queen's College of Physicians against his ejection from a fellowship.

== Political career (1878–1898) ==
Upington emigrated to the Cape Colony in 1874, due to his fragile health, from which he suffered throughout his life.

He was elected to the Cape Legislature in 1878 and stood for several constituencies in turn; Colesberg (1878–83), Caledon (1884–91), and Swellendam (1896–98). Throughout his political career he was exceptionally close to his friend and ally John Gordon Sprigg, and served regularly as Attorney General in Sprigg's governments (1878–81, 1886–90, 1896–98)

=== First Service as Attorney General (1879–81) ===
He was appointed Attorney General in 1879, by his ally, Prime Minister Gordon Sprigg.

During this time, he was active in the war on the Northern border, although in a civil capacity (he did not hold any military command). He was on "the northern bank of the Orange River at the time of the last attack, only it was thought Claus Lucas would have surrendered, and in that case Mr Upington wished to superintend the negotiations himself" (Irish Times, 6 June). He raised the military unit known as "Upington's Foot" and served in the so-called "9th Kaffir War, 1877–79" for which he received the "South Africa Medal 1877-9 (sometimes called the South Africa General Service Medal 1877-9 and sometimes the South Africa War Medal 1877-9). Upington's Foot was one of the 240 (mostly small) locally raised units which took part. It had only 30 members and fought against the Gcalekas and Gaikas in the Transkei.

Sprigg's government was unusually aggressive in its treatment of the Cape's indigenous peoples. Upington, while differing from Sprigg on many points, was not immune to such issues.

The "Koegas affair" (1879–80) involved the murder of San people (Bushmen) by farmers, near the northern frontier. In the subsequent murder trial, the farmers were acquitted, and the resulting outrage focused on Upington, as Attorney General. He was accused of deliberately allowing the trial to take place in a racist and hostile town that would be expected to acquit the murderers due to local influence, and thereby of dereliction of the Attorney General's duty. The culmination of the outrage was a public campaign, led by Saul Solomon, accusing Upington and his colleagues of allowing white juries to acquit white murderers from murdering blacks.

=== Term as Prime Minister (1884–1886) ===
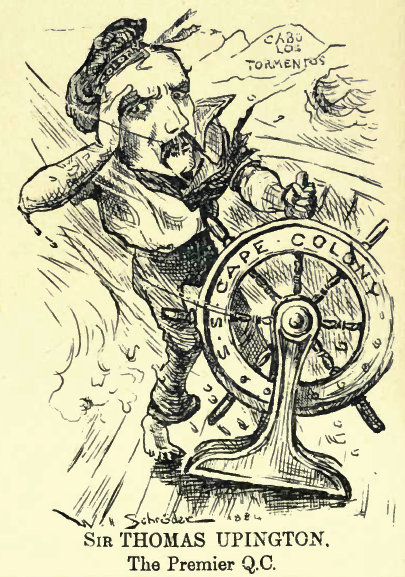
Upington leading the Cape during the "Warming-pan Ministry".

He became the fourth Prime Minister of the Cape Colony in 1884, after the growing Afrikaner Bond Party compelled the government of Premier Thomas Charles Scanlen to retire. He was appointed to form a government by the powerful Afrikaner Bond, but held office for only two turbulent and strife-torn years, in what subsequently became known as the "Warming-pan" Ministry.

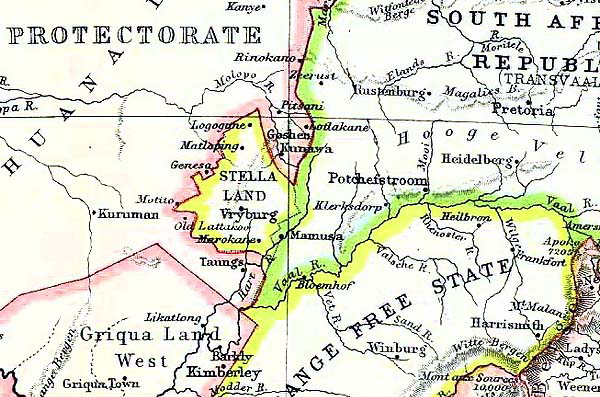
Map of the Transvaal – Bechuanaland border, showing the tiny Boer state of Stellaland. Goshen, even smaller, is located to its north-east.

==== Tensions between Boer and British ====
The principal issue that dominated Upington's short Ministry was the conflict over two tiny Boer mercenary states – Stellaland and Goshen – which had been established by Boer invaders in "British" Bechuanaland and which the British demanded were rejected. The issue placed Upington in a near impossible position as he owed his parliamentary support to the Afrikaner Bond which was strongly sympathetic of the Boer states, while the British Imperial authorities demanded his action.

In response, he travelled to Bechuanaland (with John Gordon Sprigg accompanying him as his Treasurer General) "in the endeavour to effect a peaceful arrangement". The sympathy which he at times expressed for the Boers in this controversy helped to maintain his parliamentary support, but made him very controversial in the eyes of the Imperial authorities and the Cape political elite. He was accused of propounding Parnellite principles and denounced by British politicians in Cape Town as a “Fenian” whose "offence is rank", and who "has been fraternising with Mynheer Van Dunk instead of sticking with John Bull". Even in less hostile circles, he was nonetheless known as "the Afrikaner from Cork".

==== Domestic policies ====
Regarding internal development of the country, Upington attempted to continue the highly successful locally oriented economic policies of his predecessors Molteno and Scanlen. In 1885, he oversaw the final opening of Molteno's original railway line from Cape Town to Kimberley.

He attempted to reject the flamboyant imperialism of Sprigg (and subsequent ministers such as Rhodes and Jameson), however while trying to restrict British Imperial involvement in southern Africa, he nonetheless pushed for an expansion of the Cape's frontiers into the territory of the neighbouring Xhosa. Some of his policies (such as reintroducing the infamous Contagious Diseases Acts) also brought him into conflict with the powerful liberal lobby, represented by Saul Solomon, which saw them as discriminatory against the black citizens and voters of the Cape.

==== Downfall ====
Overall, his Ministry was too short and circumscribed by greater regional forces for any consistent policies to take shape.

Attacked from all sides, his position rapidly became untenable. After coming under a fresh wave of attack over his Basutoland policy, he resigned "due to ill-health" in 1886, and handed over to his pro-imperialist ally John Gordon Sprigg.

== Character and later life ==
In 1885, he became Lieutenant Colonel, commanding the 1st Administrative Battalion, made up of the Cape Town Highlanders and two small corps. Later in 1887, he was made a Knight Commander of the Order of St Michael and St George (per South Africa, 17 December 1898, pp. 591–2).

He was famously eloquent and witty, and was often compared to his liberal enemy John X. Merriman – another distinctively thin politician at the time with a similarly ornate and witty style of speech. Though the two men opposed each other on nearly every point, they had very similar rapid-fire and flowery debating styles, that made their frequent arguments very entertaining to observe in parliament.

The Pall Mall Gazette, in 1890, described Upington as:

"the crack speaker, brilliant and sarcastic . . . The clubland of Capetown looks to him as its humorous and sententious oracle: he is a good hand at cards and the best of good company. . . He often looks and often professes to be with one foot in the grave, and his most brilliant efforts are said to be made after a few weeks' light diet of champagne (doctor’s orders). His robustest friends, however, expect him to survive to crack jokes on their epitaphs".

However his lifelong health problems worsened, and on 10 December 1898, Upington died in Wynberg, Cape Town, aged only 54.

He was survived by his widow Mary Elizabeth Guerin of Edenhill, Mallow/Fermoy, Cork, and by his children: Beauclerk, Arthur, Edith, Florence and Evelyn.

Political offices
Preceded by Andries Stockenström	Attorney General of the Cape Colony; 1879–1884	Succeeded by James W. Leonard
Preceded by Thomas Charles Scanlen	Prime Minister of Cape Colony; 1884–1886	Succeeded by Sir John Gordon Sprigg
