= John X. Merriman =

South African politician (1841–1926)

The Right Honourable John Xavier Merriman
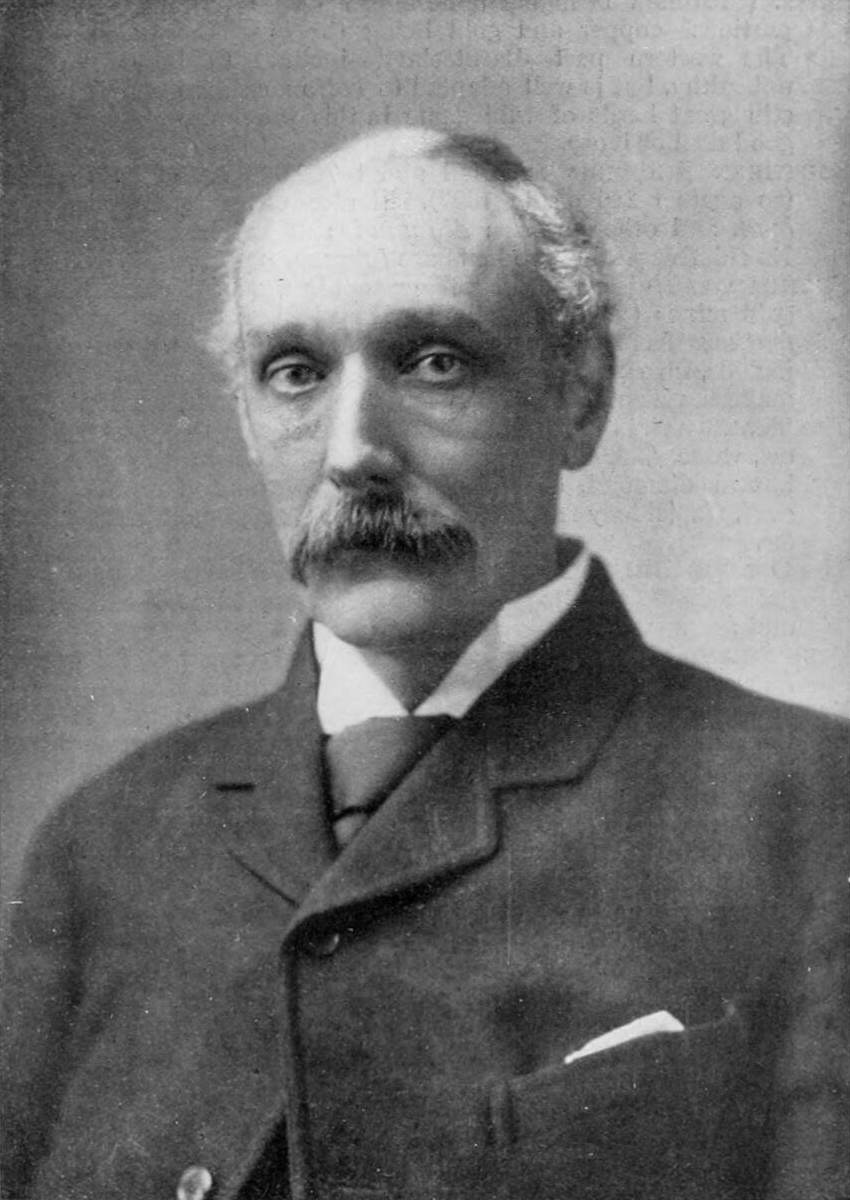

11th Prime Minister of the Cape Colony
- In office 3 February 1908 – 30 May 1910
- Monarch: Edward VII
- Governor: Sir Walter Hely-Hutchinson; Sir Henry Jenner Scobell
- Preceded by: Leander Starr Jameson
- Succeeded by: Louis Botha (Note: As Prime Minister of South Africa)

Treasurer of the Cape Colony
- In office 3 February 1908 – 30 May 1910
- Preceded by: E. H. Walton
- Succeeded by: Position abolished

Member of the Cape House of Assembly
- In office 1869–1910
- Preceded by: Position established
- Succeeded by: Position abolished

Personal details
- Born: John Xavier Merriman; 15 March 1841 Street, Somerset, United Kingdom
- Died: 1 August 1926 (aged 85) Stellenbosch, Cape Province, South Africa
- Party: South African
- Spouse: Agnes Vintcent
- Education: Diocesan College; Radley College

John Xavier Merriman (15 March 1841 – 1 August 1926) was a South African politician who served as the eleventh Prime Minister of the Cape Colony from 1908 to 1910. He was the last prime minister of the Cape Colony before the formation of the Union of South Africa in 1910. During his political career he became the longest-serving member of the Parliament of the Cape of Good Hope, serving a total of 42 years as member of Aliwal North, Wodehouse, Namaqualand, and Victoria West between 1869 and 1910.

== Early life ==
He was born in Street, Somerset, England. His parents were Nathaniel James Merriman, curate of the parish of Street and later third Bishop of Grahamstown, and his wife Julia Potter, aunt of John Gerald Potter. He emigrated to the Cape Colony with his parents in 1849, aged 8. He was educated at the Diocesan College in Rondebosch, Cape Town, and then at Radley College in England.

He returned to South Africa in 1861 and entered politics in 1869. At the time politicians normally needed to rely on a supplementary career for income, and Merriman found a secure secondary occupation as a wine farmer at Schoongezicht, Stellenbosch, after having unsuccessfully tried a range of different professions, from surveyor to prospector to factory manager to merchant.

== Political career ==
The "great object" of Merriman's life was parliament, and his parliamentary career (over 50 years) was one of the longest in Cape history. During this time he gained a reputation for great eloquence, elegant epithet and a brilliant wit, but also for erratic volatility with dramatic changes in his views.

=== Responsible Government (1869–1878) ===
At the time that he entered parliament, the Cape Colony was in the transition stage of representative government. In the Cape Parliament, he represented, firstly the district of Namaqualand, then Wodehouse and finally Victoria West.

He began his career as a conservative and an opponent of "Responsible Government" (government by an elected or "responsible" executive, rather than an appointed one), until it was successfully attained for the Cape Colony in 1872. He then became a leader of the opposition to the Cape's first elected government.

By 1875 however, he had converted completely, and the leader of the responsible government movement, now the Cape's first Prime Minister, John Molteno, recognised the young Merriman's competency and invited him to serve in his cabinet. He thus served in the Molteno government from 1875 to 1878, where he oversaw the biggest expansion of infrastructure that the Cape had ever undergone. Merriman's extraordinary gift for administration later led Molteno to trust him with pushing ahead the Cape's new railway and telegraph systems, in piloting the first South African Irrigation Act (1877) through parliament, and in protecting the Cape's internal affairs from any British government interference.

Merriman vigorously supported Molteno in rejecting Lord Carnarvon's ill-considered attempt to enforce a Confederation on the various states of southern Africa. The Colonial Office eventually overthrew the elected Cape Government in 1878, and forced the Fengu-Gcaleka, Anglo-Zulu and First Boer Wars, before the Confederation scheme finally failed as predicted. Merriman's shock at the actions of the Colonial Office developed into lasting anti-imperialist sentiments.

=== Opposition and isolation (1879–1890) ===
Merriman swiftly became the leading opponent of Sir John Gordon Sprigg, the new pro-imperialist Cape Prime Minister appointed by the Colonial Office. Now a leader of the liberals, Merriman led the attacks on Sprigg's "Bantu policy" and the discriminatory Disarmament Act, which led to the outbreak of the Basuto Gun War. The Sprigg government also provoked the Basotho Gun War, which it was unable to conclude. As the Governor's appointee, Sprigg had little local support, and when governor Sir Henry Bartle Frere was recalled to London for misconduct, his government fell.

After the fall of the Sprigg government, the volatile Merriman was not backed as the new prime minister, even though he had led the opposition, and the "safe" Thomas Charles Scanlen was elevated to the position instead. Merriman later served in the Scanlen ministry from 1881 to 1884, his private secretary in this time being Henry Latham Currey, the son of an old friend.

It was during his time in the Scanlen Ministry that Merriman rashly criticised the leader of the powerful Afrikaner Bond party, Jan Hendrik Hofmeyr, accusing him of accentuating racial divisions and famously dubbing him "the mole" for his work behind the scenes of parliament. While Merriman bore no personal animosity against him, Hofmeyr went on to topple the Scanlen government (reportedly because it opposed the Boers seizing Bechuanaland), and took decades to fully forgive Merriman. This grievance cost Merriman's career dearly, and blocked him from becoming prime minister on several occasions in the coming years.

From 1884 until 1890 he operated as a renegade liberal critic of the Upington and the second Sprigg ministry, politically isolated except for his friends JW Sauer and James Molteno.

=== Cecil Rhodes (1890–1898) ===
He was appointed Treasurer-General in Cecil Rhodes's government from 1890 to 1893, but he resigned when the 1893 "Logan Scandal" revealed the degree of corruption in Rhodes's business dealings, and then ended his relationship with Rhodes entirely after the Jameson Raid in December 1895.

Merriman chaired the Cape Commission which looked into the raid, and in its report he accused Rhodes of covert imperialist aims and requested that parliament abolish the privileges of Rhodes's Chartered Company. He also stated that the Transvaal should be reformed politically, rather than annexed by the British. In a letter to President Steyn (11 March 1898) he explained: "The greatest danger to the future lies in the attitude of President Kruger, and his vain hope of building up a State on a narrow, unenlightened minority."

Thereafter he became an ever-greater opponent of the mining interests and British imperialism in Southern Africa. This gradually regained him the sympathy and cooperation of the Afrikaner Bond led by Jan Hendrik Hofmeyr.

=== Boer War and aftermath (1899–1908) ===
He again served as Treasurer General of the Cape in the ministry of W.P. Schreiner from 1898 to 1900.

He tried but failed to prevent the Second Boer War, travelling to London with JW Sauer in attempt to dissuade the British Government from war. However they were publicly accused of being "Pro-Boer", the House of Commons refused them a hearing, and the public meetings that they held were disrupted by increasingly large numbers of violent pro-war demonstrators.

Schreiner's liberal but indecisive government fell in 1900, due to its opposition to disfranchising the "Cape rebels". With jingoist feeling running high from the Boer War, anti-war politicians suffered electoral losses across the Cape in the following years, and Merriman even lost his seat in parliament for a brief period.

In 1904 he returned however, took over leadership of the new "South African Party" from his friend and ally James Molteno, and with Molteno and Sauer, led the opposition to the ensuing exclusively-British government of Leander Starr Jameson in the lead up to the crucial national elections of January 1908.

=== Prime Minister (1908–1910) ===
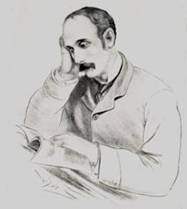
Drawing of John X Merriman from his biography

In 1908 his South African Party together with the Afrikaner Bond won control of the Assembly and he served as Prime Minister of the Cape Colony for two years, from 1908 until the formation of the Union of South Africa on 31 May 1910.

He was a leading figure in the National Convention which brought about this Union. During the union negotiations, he fought to extend the multi-racial "Cape Qualified Franchise" system (whereby suffrage qualification applied equally to all male citizens, regardless of race) to the rest of South Africa. This failed, as it was strongly opposed by the other constituent states which were determined to enforce white rule. He succeeded however, in preserving a remnant of the multi-racial qualified franchise within the Cape Province. This result greatly disappointed Merriman and his allies, for whom the only possible justification of the Boer war had been to serve to eradicate the Transvaal's colour bar.

Merriman had originally been proposed as the first prime minister of the new union, and several of the constituent states, such as the Orange Free State, supported him for this position. However Lord Gladstone, the first Governor-General, asked the Afrikaner statesman, Louis Botha to form a government. Merriman declined to accept a post in the first Union Cabinet.

=== Career in the Union parliament ===
After union, he continued to serve in the Parliament of South Africa, representing first the constituency of Victoria West, and then Stellenbosch. He carried on a lively correspondence with Jan Smuts, constantly warning him about possibilities of rebellion and civil war with Afrikaner sections of the white population who objected to South African cooperation with Great Britain against Germany in World War I, especially the South African invasion of German South-West Africa, now Namibia.

He was one of only a few members of Parliament who opposed the Native Land Act in 1913, which was legislation that drastically limited African ownership of land.

=== Political legacy ===
Merriman has subsequently been hailed as a brilliant but paradoxical statesman. An outspoken individualist, his career was marked by dramatic changes in his political position, but also by growing liberal convictions. Significantly, this painful evolution in his views early on saw him entirely change his attitude towards the Cape's Black citizens, from a deep prejudice when he first arrived in the Cape, to an attitude of enlightened respect. John Molteno noted this change with great approval in 1874 before appointing Merriman to his first cabinet position, and credited the persuasive arguments of liberal parliamentarians such as Saul Solomon as the transforming influence (Cape Argus, 1874).

For much of his career, in spite of his obvious ability, Merriman found himself in a liberal minority — fighting on two fronts against both the pro-imperialist "Progressives" of Rhodes and Milner, and the reactionary nationalism of the Afrikaner Bond. His South African Party was, in effect, practically defined by its opposition to imperialism and its support for the multi-racial franchise.

Merriman's paradoxes extended to his views on race. Despite believing in the legal rights of all people, Merriman did not hold favorable views of black Africans: In writing to Jan Smuts in March 1906 to advocate for the extension of the Cape Qualified Franchise to rest of the proposed Union of South Africa, he admitted "I do not like the natives at all and I wish we had no black man in South Africa" but characterized their political exclusion as "building on a volcano the suppressed force of which must some day burst forth in a destroying flood." He repeated this position in a letter to Smuts in 1908: "To me personally the idea of a Native franchise is repellant but I am convinced that it is a safety-valve [. . .] which puts an end to the political unrest that any unrepresented population will always have."

Merriman's inclusive and open attitude to race relations did not, initially, extend to gender. In July 1907, some of his closest allies Antonie Viljoen, JW Sauer and James Molteno were supporting an extension of the right to vote to women, however Merriman vigorously (and successfully) opposed them in a long, and very bitter, debate.

Nonetheless, by the time of the Union of South Africa he was widely considered to be the most prominent and influential liberal in South Africa, though he was criticised by allies and friends, such as Olive Schreiner, for not abiding by the principles of the Cape Liberal Tradition with consistency.

== Personal life ==
Merriman was described as a distinctive and very memorable character. Strikingly tall and thin, with a dramatic and quickfire manner of speaking, he made a strong impression on those who met him.

In 1874 he married Agnes Vintcent daughter of Mr. Joseph Vintcent, a member of the Cape Legislative Council. Though they had no children, the marriage was exceptionally happy. In 1892 he purchased a farm in Stellenbosch which later became Rustenberg Wines. The company has honoured him by naming its flagship red bordeaux blend after him.

He died, aged 85, in Stellenbosch, South Africa, in 1926. A prominent street in the town is called Merriman Avenue and a railway siding near Victoria West is named Merriman.

== Notes and references ==
- "South Africa – The Cape Ministry". The Colonist. Vol. L, no. 12158. 5 February 1908. p. 4 – via Papers Past.
- Sugden, Alan Victor; Entwisle, E. A. (1939). Potters of Darwen, 1839 : 1939: A Century of Wallpaper Printing by Machinery. George Falkner & sons.
- Statham, Francis Reginald (1881). Blacks, Boers, and British, a Three-cornered Problem, by F. Reginald Statham. Macmillan.
- Laurence, Sir Perceval Maitland (1930). The Life of John Xavier Merriman. Constable.
- This article incorporates text from a publication now in the public domain: Cana, Frank Richardson (1922). "Merriman, John Xavier". Encyclopædia Britannica. Vol. 31 (12th ed.). p. 914.
- Kilpin, Ralph (1918). The Old Cape House: Being Pages from the History of a Legislative Assembly. T. M. Miller.
- Lewsen, Phyllis (1982). John X. Merriman: Paradoxical South African Statesman. Johannesburg: Ad. Donker. ISBN 978-0-300-02521-7.

Political offices
Preceded by Henry Steele	Representative of Namaqualand; 1869–???	Succeeded by ???
Preceded by ???	Representative of Wodehouse ???–???	Succeeded by ???
Preceded by ???	Representative of Victoria West ???–???	Succeeded by ???
Preceded by Charles Abercrombie Smith	Minister for Crown Lands and Public Works, Cape Colony; 1875–1878	Succeeded by Frederick Schermbrucker
Preceded by John Gordon Sprigg	Cape Colony Treasurer General; 1890–1893	Succeeded by John Gordon Sprigg
Preceded by ???	Cape Colony Cabinet Member; 1881–1894	Succeeded by ???
Preceded by ???	British South Africa Company Treasurer-General; 1890–1893	Succeeded by ???
Preceded by T. Te Water	Cape Colony Treasurer General; 1898–1900	Succeeded by E.H. Walton
Preceded by Leander Starr Jameson	Prime Minister of the Cape Colony; 1908–1910	Merged into Union of South Africa
Party political offices
New title	Leader of the South African Party (Cape Colony); 1908–1910	Merged with others to form South African Party
