= Gordon Sprigg =

British colonial administrator and politician (1830–1913)

The Right Honourable Sir John Gordon Sprigg GCMG
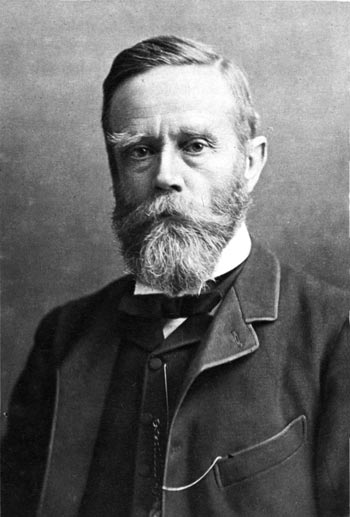

Prime Minister of the Cape Colony
- In office 18 June 1900 – 21 February 1904
- Monarchs: Victoria; Edward VII
- Governor: Alfred Milner; Walter Hely-Hutchinson
- Preceded by: William Philip Schreiner
- Succeeded by: Leander Starr Jameson
- In office 13 January 1896 – 13 October 1898
- Monarch: Victoria
- Governor: Hercules Robinson; Alfred Milner
- Preceded by: Cecil John Rhodes
- Succeeded by: William Philip Schreiner
- In office 25 November 1886 – 16 July 1890
- Monarch: Victoria
- Governor: Hercules Robinson; Henry Brougham Loch
- Preceded by: Thomas Upington
- Succeeded by: Cecil John Rhodes
- In office 6 February 1878 – 8 May 1881
- Monarch: Victoria
- Governor: Henry Bartle Frere
- Preceded by: Sir John Molteno
- Succeeded by: Thomas Charles Scanlen

Personal details
- Born: John Gordon Sprigg; 27 April 1830 Ipswich, Suffolk, England
- Died: 4 February 1913 (aged 82) Wynberg, Cape Town, South Africa
- Party: Progressive

Sir John Gordon Sprigg GCMG, PC (27 April 1830 – 4 February 1913) was a British colonial administrator and politician who served as prime minister of the Cape Colony on four occasions.

== Early life ==
Sprigg was born in Ipswich, England, on 27 April 1830, the second son of the Reverend James Sprigg, a Baptist minister, and his wife, Maria Gardiner. His devout and strictly conservative upbringing had a lifelong effect on his values; until the end of his life, one of Sprigg's proudest claims was that his ancestor had been one of Oliver Cromwell's chaplains.

He was educated at Ipswich School, as well as a series of other private schools. He started his career in a shipbuilder's office, and then switched jobs to become a short-hand writer and reporter. However, his fragile health caused him to emigrate to the Cape Colony in 1858 to recuperate, and here he decided to settle. He managed to acquire a farm named 'Sunnyside' in what was known at the time as British Kaffraria (near what is today East London), and began to get involved in local politics.

His newly acquired property lay near the Cape's frontier, and was therefore surrounded by a large population of non-Christian Xhosa people – whom Sprigg regarded with considerable suspicion. This led him to become very concerned about issues of frontier security, and he regularly prioritised such issues in his political career.

== Political career ==
In 1869, he became the member of the Cape Parliament for East London.
He notably ran the Commission for Frontier Defense which recommended that the defence of the Cape Colony be separately administered for the Eastern and Western halves of the Colony and that the Cape's defences be racially segregated. Both suggestions were rejected outright by the prime minister at the time, John Molteno, a strong advocate of racial and regional unity in the Cape.

Sprigg nonetheless joined Molteno's movement for responsible government, and in June 1875 he added his voice to those of other prominent local politicians (such as Saul Solomon, John X. Merriman and Molteno himself) in condemning as impractical Lord Carnarvon's ill-advised scheme to confederate southern Africa under British rule. Lord Carnarvon nevertheless pushed ahead and replaced the Cape governor with his own political ally Henry Bartle Frere with the intent of forcing the region into confederation, and Sprigg, along with fellow parliamentarian John Paterson, prudently re-aligned themselves as pro-federalists. Sprigg was to remain a federalist for the remainder of his career. As the previous opposition leader, John X. Merriman converted and joined the Molteno government, Sprigg and Paterson became the de facto leaders of the opposition.

As the machinations began for bringing the neighbouring states into the British confederation, tensions between the British Empire and the Cape government increased. Molteno himself had a deep suspicion of the British Empire, citing what he believed to be its incompetence and injustice, and he stubbornly obstructed London's decision to deploy imperial troops against the neighbouring Xhosa during the Xhosa Wars. Offers of titles and threats of dismissal failed to persuade him to back down, and an inevitable collision loomed between the Cape government and the British Empire.

=== First Ministry (1878–1881) ===
In 1878, Governor Frere appealed to the authority of the Colonial Office to suspend the elected Cape government, and assumed direct control of the country. Frere's first attempts to find a replacement government were unsuccessful, as the Cape's most influential local leaders all refused his request to take office. Frere then turned to Sprigg, his closest local ally, and offered him the position of Prime Minister and Colonial Secretary. In spite of the frontier war, Sprigg famously left his family and farm on the border immediately, to assist Frere in forming a new Cape government. It was a favour which Frere greatly valued, and, writing to Carnarvon (12 January 1879), he praised the important and historic role played by " .. the gallant little English farmer, who left his "laager" on the rebel frontier to help me when the Molteno-Merriman conspiracy to humble Sir Arthur Cunynghame, and through him the English Government, was so nearly successful."

Frere appointed Sprigg on condition that he supported confederation, so Sprigg dutifully began making arrangements for a "Federal Conference" in June 1880. However, local Cape opposition to it was so strong and widespread that Sprigg had to give up on the idea. Elsewhere in southern Africa, Frere's attempts to enforce confederation were sparking wars with the Xhosa, the Zulu Kingdom, the Pedi and the Transvaal Republic. A consequence of this was that Sprigg was prime minister during the disastrous First Boer War (1880–1881). This period also saw massive spending on defence and the accumulation of a large government debt. In response, Sprigg revived the deeply unpopular hut tax which had been terminated by his predecessor (Act 11 of 1872).

At the time of taking office, Sprigg faced a parliament which was overwhelmingly supportive of the previous government which Frere had deposed. Sprigg's ability to assume office, and garnering the required majority in the elected Cape Parliament, was due to several key factors. Firstly, Frere placed the considerable authority of the Crown and the British Empire behind Sprigg. Secondly, the representative of the Molteno government, in its public response to Frere's action, made the strategic error of attacking the legitimacy of the Governor and thereby of the authority of the British Crown itself. Expressing anti-imperialist sentiments could be highly offensive in conservative Victorian society, and in the wartime atmosphere, Molteno's party consequently lost the majority of its parliamentary support. Eventually, the most influential MP at the time, Saul Solomon, cautiously gave his support to Sprigg, who was then able to take office with the required majority.

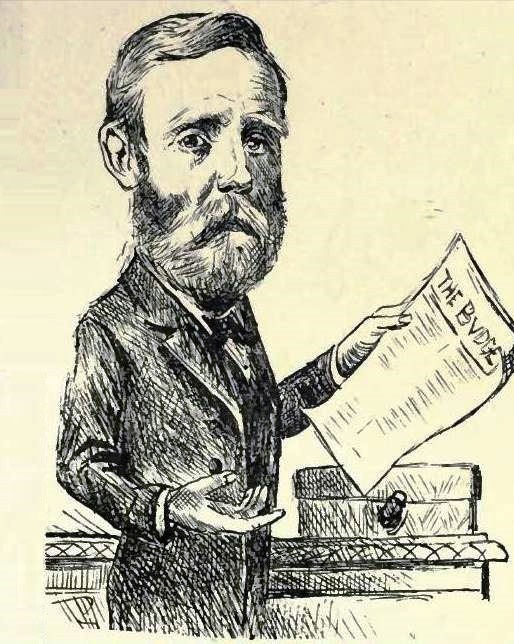
An early cartoon of John Gordon Sprigg holding the national budget. Sprigg's terms in office were often characterised by a notoriously unsustainable fiscal policy.

Unlike the preceding, relatively mixed government, Sprigg's cabinet consisted exclusively of British South Africans, dominated by pro-imperialist politicians who all hailed, like Sprigg himself, from the Eastern Province and were descended from the 1820 Settlers. His government consequently came to be known as the "Settler Ministry".

With Governor Henry Bartle Frere's support, Sprigg finally succeeded in implementing the conclusion of his Commission for Frontier Defense, which had been fiercely blocked by the previous government. This involved the disarming of all Black Africans in the Cape, including the soldiers and citizens in its own armed forces. His resultant "Peace Preservation Act" (1878) caused immediate uprisings across the country, that swiftly flared into overt wars. Against the advice of many in parliament, Sprigg went ahead with applying the act in Basutoland – at the time administered by the Cape. The resulting Basuto Gun War, together with continued conflict with the Xhosa, saw the Cape government dragged towards bankruptcy. In fact, colonial instigation and mis-management of the Basuto Gun War is one of the main reasons why Lesotho eventually became an independent country, and not part of modern South Africa.

Sprigg's imperialist policies towards neighboring states including calling in imperial troops during the Basuto Gun War, confiscation of tribal lands, and supporting the expansion of white settlement into Black African territory. This policy eventually crushed and subsumed the last independent Xhosa state, but led to the 1880 Transkeian Rebellion and a further string of conflicts elsewhere in southern Africa.

Rising costs from the lingering wars forced him to cut back on infrastructure projects such as railway construction and other public works. Even his predecessor's veterinary bureau was closed.

In spite of his good relationship with the Colonial Office, Sprigg had little grass-roots support locally, and when Frere was recalled to London to face charges of misconduct, his government fell. He was succeeded as prime minister by locally born Thomas Charles Scanlen.

Sprigg's subsequent terms as prime minister came at a time of increased tension between the colonists of British descent and the Afrikaners, tension that was sharply exacerbated by the Confederation attempt and the subsequent rise of the Afrikaner Bond. These disagreements eventually culminated in the Second Boer War. This era also saw the origin of the South African Customs Union, and a slow but steady erosion of the rights of the Cape's Black citizens.

=== Second Ministry (1886–1890) ===
Sprigg got an opportunity for a second term as prime minister when Thomas Upington resigned in 1886 due to ill-health. His second term was dominated by two major issues: the voting rights of Black African citizens of the Cape, and the issue of railways.

The Cape constitution guaranteed equal voting rights for citizens of all races through its "Cape Qualified Franchise" system, however Sprigg was concerned about the rapid political mobilisation of the Cape's large and growing African population. In addition, the recent annexation (during Sprigg's first Ministry) of the Transkei Xhosa lands meant that, for the first time, Xhosa people now comprised a majority of the Cape's population. Black African voters already formed a majority of the electorate in several Cape constituencies, and were beginning to form a considerable voting block, especially in the Eastern Cape where he resided.

He circumvented this with his Registration Bill in 1887, which excluded communal land-owners from voting and thus effectively disenfranchised a large proportion of the Cape's Black African citizens. (His successor as prime minister, Cecil John Rhodes, was to take these changes even further, by raising the franchise requirements in the Cape Colony and thus further countering the growing preponderance of Black and mixed-race voters.) This massive disenfranchisement faced furious resistance both from liberal parliamentarians and from Black political organisations who were strong supporters of the original non-racial franchise. However, through persistence and mastery of parliamentary procedure, Sprigg successfully passed the measure.

He was much less successful in his railway policy. His attempts to extend the Cape's railways to Natal and the Transvaal Republic failed, due to the continued tensions remaining from the earlier confederation scheme and its resultant wars. In addition, his 1889 railway proposals were massively impractical and expensive. The costs came to 7,500,000 pounds and caused his second ministry to fall on 16 July 1890.

=== Third Ministry (1896–1898) ===
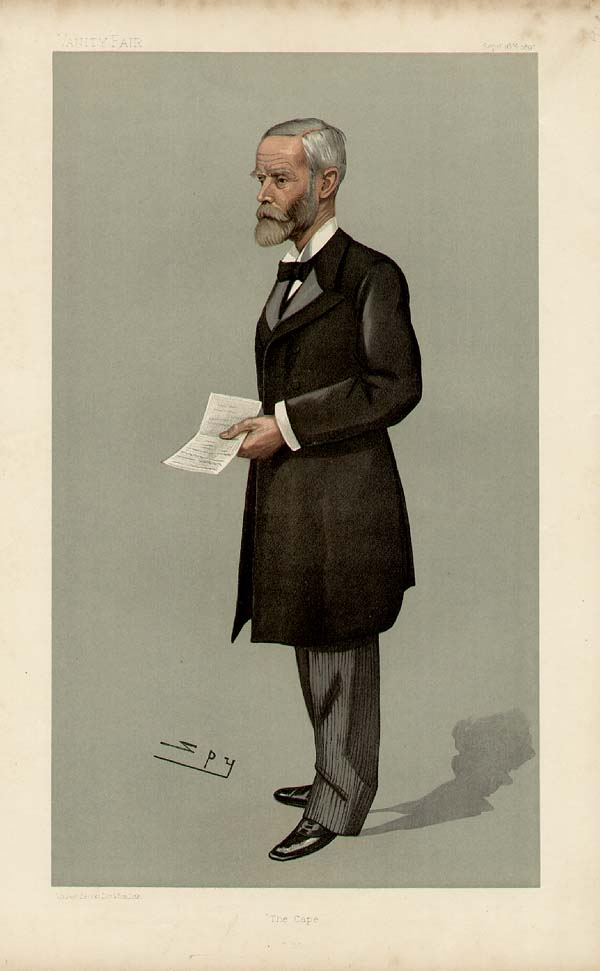
Drawing of John Gordon Sprigg as Prime Minister in September 1897

A few years later, in 1893, the "Logan scandal" caused the Prime Minister at the time, Cecil John Rhodes, to lose much of his parliamentary support. Sprigg made himself available to Rhodes for a cabinet position and in the power vacuum he successfully re-secured the position of treasurer. Sprigg went on to become one of the most vocal and loyal of Rhodes's supporters. When the Jameson Raid forced Rhodes to resign in 1896, Sprigg was once again the best stop-gap candidate for premier.

In 1897 he traveled to London to attend Queen Victoria's Diamond Jubilee, where a brief controversy ensued. He publicly offered a cruiser to the Royal Navy, on behalf of the Cape, and received an honorary LLD from Edinburgh and an honorary DCL from Oxford. However, upon his return, he was forced to withdraw his promise to the Admiralty, which had not been authorised by parliament.

The major theme of his third ministry was his increasing disagreement with the powerful Afrikaner Bond party, caused partly by his continued political assistance to Rhodes. In early 1898 he attempted to restructure the electoral system so as to favour the predominantly urban towns with a higher population of British South Africans over the predominantly rural towns with a higher Boer population, but his "redistribution bill" was defeated. He then lost a vote of no confidence that was initiated by William Philip Schreiner in May 1898, but fought to keep his position through the resultant general election, which he lost after an acrimonious campaign; his ministry finally fell to a second motion of no confidence later in the year. Schreiner succeeded him as premier, just in time to bear the brunt of the crisis of the Second Anglo-Boer War.

=== Fourth Ministry (1900–1904) ===
Schreiner was forced to resign in June 1900 because of his anti-war stance, and Sprigg, who was seen in London as an acceptably pro-imperialist candidate, was appointed prime minister for the fourth and last time, though still without parliamentary sanction. However he was now officially representing a political party, the pro-imperialist Progressives which had been established by diamond magnate and colonialist Cecil Rhodes.

Sprigg's final ministry coincided with the Second Boer War (1899–1902), during which the supplying of the army in the field caused a massive artificial inflation of trade in Southern Africa. This, together with his policy of heavy expenditure, severely damaged the finances of the Cape Colony.

However, in his final term in office, Sprigg distinguished himself more than anything else through his work on the suspension issue. He had begun his fourth term by closely toeing the line of the Colonial Office in London, but this became increasingly difficult, as it brought him into conflict with the largest parties in the Cape parliament. His refusal to launch an inquiry into the harsh sentences passed during martial law lost him further support, which he needed if he was to appease the Colonial Office, but he finally took a stand when Alfred Milner ordered him to suspend the Cape constitution, supposedly as a preparation for a future confederation.

Sprigg strongly supported confederation, as he had since his first Ministry, but he hesitated on the issue of suspending the country's constitution. However, after Rhodes died in 1902, he immediately declared his resolute opposition to the suspension proposal, speaking against it in London and arguably doing more than anyone else to protect the Cape's constitution and to defeat Milner's proposal. Meanwhile, the delicate balancing act that Sprigg needed to perform in order to survive politically became ever more precarious, until a string of defeats in parliament and in the 1904 election toppled his government for the final time. However, his work against suspension came later to be regarded as his greatest deed as a statesman and his strongest claim to political recognition.

Although Sprigg served as prime minister four times— from 1878 to 1881, 1886 to 1890, 1896 to 1898 and 1900 to 1904—he was always appointed by the British governor, never elected democratically. He was appointed as a Privy Counsellor of the United Kingdom in 1897.

The Dictionary of South African Biography (Vol.II) described him thus:

"Small, determined and conceited, Sprigg well deserved Merriman's appellation of "The little Master". He coveted power and clung to it tenaciously, being content to change his colleagues, as long as he was left undisturbed in office. Moreover, his tremendous patience and mastery of parliamentary procedure gave him great advantages over more inspired but less diligent politicians. On the whole, he was a man of integrity and has a strong claim to be placed high in the ranks of South African statesmen."

== Later life ==
Sprigg retired from politics after 1904, although he reappeared briefly in 1908 and voted against a parliamentary colour bar in 1909. In his later life he received an impressive array of awards and honours for his work in serving British rule in South Africa, such as being created a Knight Commander of the Order of St Michael and St George (KCMG) in 1886 and being promoted to Knight Grand Cross (GCMG) in the 1902 Coronation Honours. He also received honorary doctorates from the University of Oxford and the University of Edinburgh (LL.D., July 1902).

He died at his home in Wynberg on 4 February 1913, and was buried at St. Peter's Cemetery, Mowbray.

Gordonia in the Northern Cape was named in his honour.

== Family ==
In 1862, Sprigg married Ellen Eliza Fleischer (died 1900), the daughter of James Fleischer, a neighbouring farmer in British Kaffraria. They had four children: a son, William Porter Sprigg, who served as a captain in the Cape Colonial Forces, and three daughters: Florence, who married Richard Nixon (not to be confused with the American president); Jessamy, who remained unmarried; and Lucilla, who married Albert Percy Sprigg and predeceased her father.

== See also ==
- History of Cape Colony from 1870 to 1899
- Saul Solomon
- John Paterson

Political offices
Preceded by Sir John Molteno	Prime Minister of Cape Colony; 1878–1881	Succeeded by Thomas Charles Scanlen
Preceded by Thomas Upington	Prime Minister of Cape Colony; 1886–1890	Succeeded by Cecil Rhodes
Preceded by Cecil Rhodes	Prime Minister of Cape Colony; 1896–1898	Succeeded by William Philip Schreiner
Preceded by William Philip Schreiner	Prime Minister of Cape Colony; 1900–1904	Succeeded by Leander Starr Jameson
