= Cabinet of Louis Botha (Transvaal Colony) =

- 1st Cabinet of Transvaal Colony (since grant of self-government, 6 December 1906)
- 1907
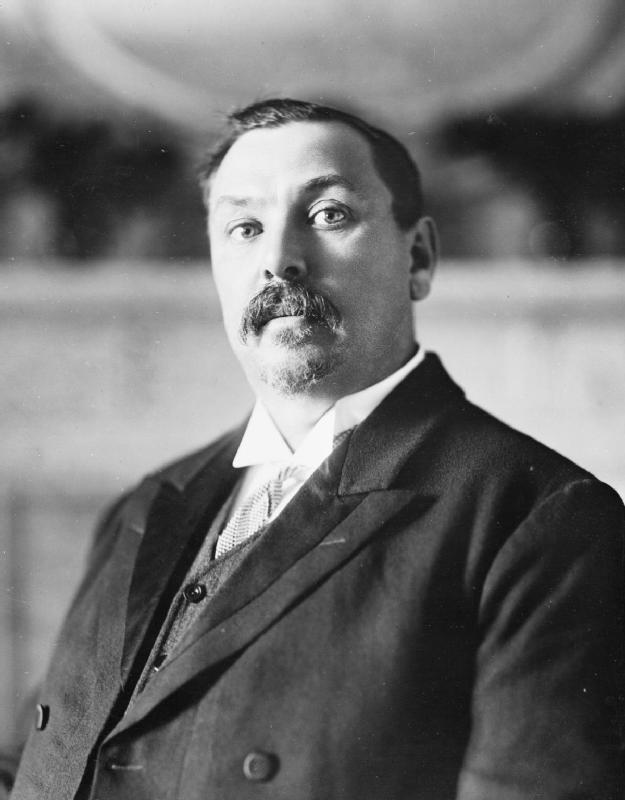
- Date formed: 4 March 1907
- Date dissolved: 31 May 1910

People and organisations
- Head of state: Edward VII; George V (represented by The Earl of Selborne, High Commissioner)
- Head of government: Louis Botha
- No. of ministers: 6
- Member party: Het Volk Party; National Association
- Status in legislature: Majority
- Opposition party: Progressive Party
- Opposition leader: George Farrar

History
- Election: 1907
- Legislature terms: 3 years, 3 months and 30 days
- Predecessor: None
- Successor: 1st Provincial Executive Committee

1907 election results.

Louis Botha became Prime Minister of the Transvaal Colony on 4 March 1907, following the results of the election of 1907, with his Het Volk Party winning 37 out of 69 seats (including three affiliated independents) to the Legislative Assembly, ahead of the Progressive Party (21 seats), the National Association (16), Labour (3 seats) and 2 independents. On the results, the Governor, The Earl of Selbourne, wrote to the Colonial Office: "The clear majority which Het Volk has won over all other parties combined, together with the defeat of Sir Richard Solomon by Sir Percy FitzPatrick, has of course made it necessary for me to send for General Botha, and I have very little doubt that he will form a Ministry consisting mainly, if not entirely, of members of his own party".

After having initially considered a fully Het Volk ministry, at the instigation of former Colonial Attorney-General, Sir Richard Solomon (who declined to serve in the cabinet and was appointed to be Agent-General in London), Botha subsequently formed a 6-member cabinet (maximum allowed) with members of the Nationalist Party, who "were all men of progressive, in some respects democratic, views, and in thus forming his cabinet General Botha showed his determination not to be dominated by the "back veld" Boers". Among the members of Het Volk who were originally considered for positions were diamond mine manager, Thomas Cullinan (Lands/Public Works) and Andries Stockenstrom (Speaker).

The ministry was formally sworn into office in Parliament Hall, Pretoria by the Governor, The Earl of Selborne, on 4 March 1907. The Cabinet was involved in discussions to form the Union of South Africa, with Botha, Smuts and Hull attending the 1908–09 National Convention as delegates, and which was finally achieved on 31 May 1910. The Cabinet was the only body of the Transvaal Colony from the granting of responsible self-government by letters patent on 6 December 1906, and was superseded by the Transvaal Provincial Executive Committee of the Transvaal Provincial Council with Rissik as the first Provincial Administrator.

== Cabinet ==
Portfolio	Minister	Party	Term start	Term end
Prime Minister; Minister of Agriculture	Rt Hon. Louis Botha	Het Volk	4 March 1907	31 May 1910
Colonial Secretary	Hon. Jan Smuts	Het Volk	4 March 1907	31 May 1910
Minister of Public Works	Hon. Edward Philip Solomon	National Association	4 March 1907	31 May 1910
Colonial Treasurer	Hon. Henry Charles Hull	National Association	4 March 1907	31 May 1910
Attorney-General; Minister of Mines	Hon. Jacob de Villiers	Het Volk	4 March 1907	31 May 1910
Minister of Lands; Minister of Native Affairs	Hon. Johann Rissik	National Association	4 March 1907	31 May 1910
