= William Henry Solomon =

South African judge (1852-1930)

The Right Honourable Sir William Henry Solomon KCSI KCMG PC KC
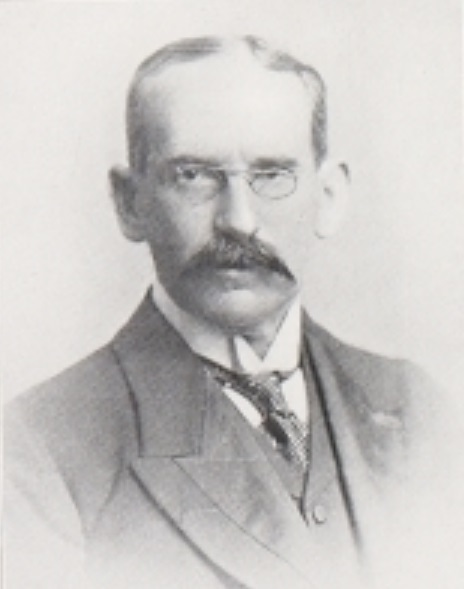

3rd Chief Justice of South Africa
- In office 1927–1929
- Preceded by: James Rose Innes
- Succeeded by: Jacob de Villiers

Judge of the Appellate Division
- In office 1910–1929

Judge of the Griqualand West High Court
- In office 1900–1910

Personal details
- Born: 25 September 1852 Philippolis, Orange Free State
- Died: 13 June 1930 (aged 77) London, England
- Resting place: Brookwood Cemetery, London
- Relations: Richard Solomon (brother); Edward Solomon (brother); Saul Solomon (uncle)
- Education: Lovedale; Cape University; Peterhouse, Cambridge
- Profession: Barrister

Sir William Henry Solomon KCSI KCMG PC KC (25 September 1852 – 3 June 1930) was a judge of the Appellate Division from 1910 to 1929 and Chief Justice of South Africa from 1927 to 1929.

== Early life and family ==
Born in 1852, he was the son of the missionary Edward Solomon and his wife, Jessie Matthews. He was also the nephew of the great liberal politician and founder of the Cape Argus, Saul Solomon.

== Career ==
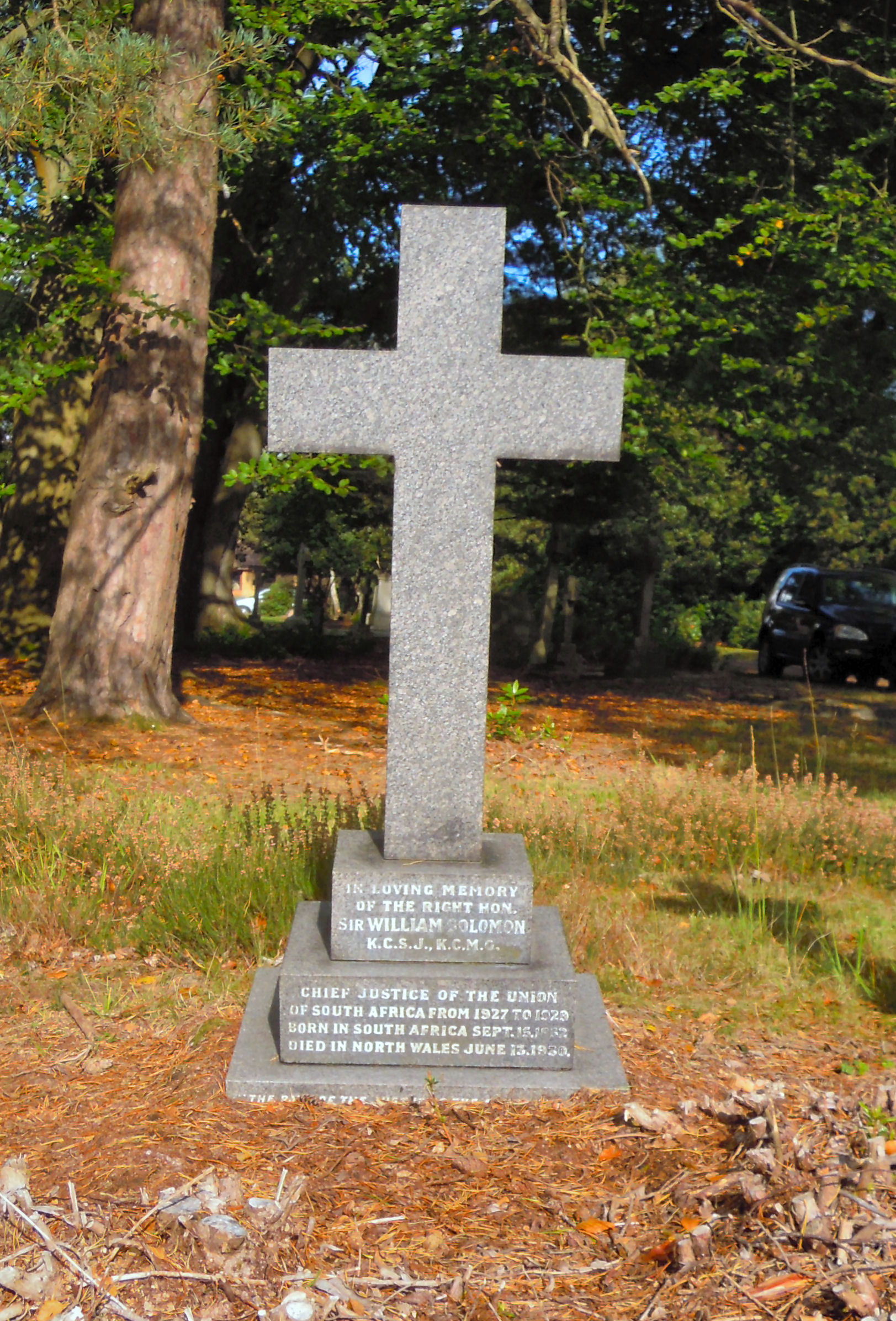
The grave of Sir William Solomon in Brookwood Cemetery

From the age of 35, he served for 10 years as a judge for the Griqualand West supreme court.

After the end of the Second Boer War, the government of the newly created British Colony of Transvaal established a Supreme Court of Transvaal in April 1902. The governor, Lord Milner, appointed Wessels as one of three puisne judges, with Sir James Rose Innes as Chief Justice. Solomon was transferred to this Supreme Court too, and he was appointed to the first Appeal Court for the new Union of South Africa when it was formed in 1910.

He was appointed Chief Justice of South Africa in 1927. At the end of his career he also sat on the Judicial Committee of the Privy Council.

He is buried in the Solomon family plot in Brookwood Cemetery.

Legal offices
Preceded by Sir James Rose Innes	Chief Justice of South Africa; 1927–1929	Succeeded by Jacob de Villiers
