= Jacob de Villiers =

The Right Honourable Jacob de Villiers PC
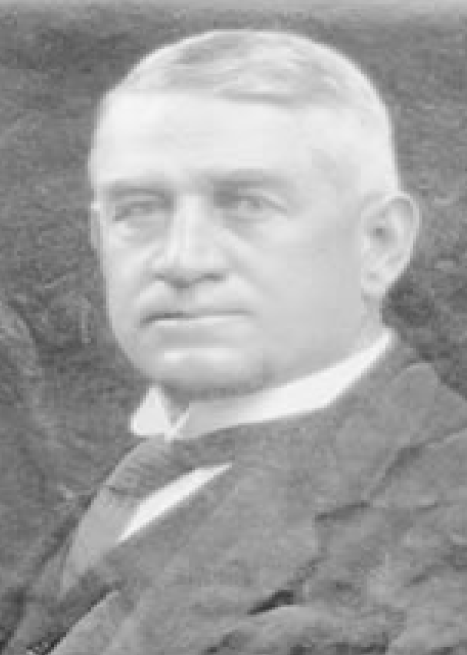

4th Chief Justice of South Africa
- In office 1929–1932
- Preceded by: William Henry Solomon
- Succeeded by: John Wessels

Judge of the Appellate Division
- In office 1920–1929

Judge President of the Transvaal Provincial Division
- In office 1910–1920
- Preceded by: New position
- Succeeded by: John Wessels

Attorney General of the Transvaal
- In office 1907–1910
- Appointed by: Louis Botha
- Preceded by: Herbert Francis Blaine
- Succeeded by: Office abolished

Transvaal Minister of Mines
- In office 1907–1910
- Appointed by: Louis Botha
- Preceded by: New title
- Succeeded by: Office abolished

Attorney General of the Orange Free State
- In office 1896–1898
- Appointed by: Martinus Theunis Steyn

Personal details
- Born: 14 December 1868 Fauresmith, Orange Free State
- Died: 16 September 1932 (aged 63) London, England
- Education: Grey College; Stellenbosch University; University of London
- Profession: Barrister

Jacob Abraham Jeremy de Villiers PC (14 December 1868 – 16 September 1932) was a judge of the Appellate Division from 1920 to 1932 and Chief Justice of South Africa from 1929 to 1932.

== Early life and education ==
De Villiers was born in Fauresmith, the son of Jacobus Johannes Luttig de Villiers, deputy sheriff at Fauresmith and his second wife, Johanna Lodewica Oberholzer. The family later moved to Winburg, where his father became the sheriff. De Villiers matriculated at Grey College in Bloemfontein, passing the Matriculation Examination in 1886 and winning two bursaries. He continued his studies at the Victoria College in Stellenbosch. De Villiers gained first place in the B.A. examination in 1889 and was awarded a William Porter Bursary.

In 1890, he went to the Netherlands to study law at the University of Amsterdam, but in July that year decided to compete for a senior bursary in law at the University of London. He completed the examination in August 1891, in which he came first and won the Senior Studentship.

== Career ==
De Villiers was admitted to the Middle Temple in January 1893, thereby qualifying for admission to the Johannesburg Bar, where he began to practise in 1894. After the Jameson Raid, De Villiers acted as the assistant to John Wessels, in defending the Reformers in the high treason trial, following the Raid. Shortly after the trial, the Orange Free State President, M. T. Steyn appointed him Attorney General of the Orange Free State, a post he occupied for a short while. He resigned the post in 1898 and returned to the Johannesburg Bar.

When the Second Boer War broke out in October 1899, De Villiers joined the Free State forces and served as legal adviser to general Marthinus Prinsloo. During the Battle of Bothaville, on 6 November 1900, he was seriously wounded in the front lines when a bullet passed through both of his legs. He was captured by the British and deported to a POW camp in Bermuda, where he spent eighteen months. After the war he toured through England, France and Germany before returning to Johannesburg and resuming his practice in 1903.

After Britain granted self-rule to the two former Boer colonies, the Transvaal Colony held an election in February 1907. De Villiers became member of the Legislative Assembly for Maraisburg and was included in the first elected Cabinet of the Transvaal Colony as Attorney General (effectively the Minister of Justice) and Minister of Mines.

When the Union of South Africa was formed in 1910, de Villiers was not included in the first Union cabinet but was appointed the first Judge-President of the Transvaal Provincial Division and also additional Judge of Appellate Division. He became a permanent Judge of Appeal in 1920 and after the death of Sir William Solomon in 1929, he was appointed Chief Justice of the Union of South Africa and in 1931 he was made a member of the Privy Council.

The five judges of the South African Appellate Division in 1923 (from left): Sir John Gilbert Kotzé, Sir William Henry Solomon, Sir James Rose Innes (then Chief Justice), de Villiers and Sir John Wessels.

== Honours ==
De Villiers was awarded an honorary doctorate in law by the University of Stellenbosch in June 1931 and at the beginning of 1932 he was appointed chancellor of the university, but died before he could be inaugurated.

== Personal life ==
De Villiers married the widow, Maria Jacoba Carolina Meintjies in November 1907 and they had three children. De Villiers left for Germany in April 1932 for medical treatment but died five months later in London, England.

Legal offices
Preceded by Sir William Henry Solomon	Chief Justice of South Africa; 1929–1932	Succeeded by Sir John Wessels
