= Henry Charles Hull =

South African politician (1860–1932)

Honourable Henry Charles Hull

Minister of Finance
- In office 1910–1912
- Prime Minister: Louis Botha
- Succeeded by: Jan Smuts

Colonial Treasurer, Transvaal Colony
- In office 1907–1910
- Prime Minister: Louis Botha

Personal details
- Born: 21 November 1860 Caledon, Cape Colony
- Died: 9 October 1932 (aged 71) Muizenberg
- Party: South African Party
- Other political affiliations: Nationalists (Transvaal Responsible Government Association)

Henry Charles Hull (21 November 1860 – 9 October 1932) was the first South African Minister of Finance when the Union of South Africa was formed in March 1910. He served in the first Louis Botha cabinet. He assisted in drafting of South Africa's first constitution. He was a lawyer, politician, and mining financier. He assisted in the formation of Anglo American plc.

== Background ==
His career started with an appointment in the Cape civil service based in Kimberley. He soon took the bar and practiced as a lawyer. In 1889, he left Kimberley and head for Johannesburg and its goldfields to continue his legal career. There he would join the Johannesburg Reform Committee that was advocating for equal rights for Uitlanders in the South African Republic. After the failed attempt to overthrow of that government via the Jameson Raid, Hull was arrested as were many other members of the Reform Committee. Tried for treason, he was found guilty, imprisoned for two years, commuted, expelled for three years, and fined £2000.

When the Second Boer War started in 1899, he recruited men to British army in order to form the South African Light Horse, Marshall's Horse, and the Eastern Province Horse. Hull would participate in war with General Brabant's column when it relieved the besieged British forces at Wepener.

After the end of hostilities in 1902, he was appointed to the unelected Legislative Council of the Transvaal Colony in 1903 by Alfred Milner.

In 1904, Hull formed a legal partnership in Johannesburg with lawyers Edward Solomon, Charles A. Wentzel, and Walter Webber.

Hull would join the Transvaal National Association, later called the Nationalists, and was opposed to Milner's use of Chinese labour on goldfields. In 1907, the Transvaal Colony obtain self-governance and Hull was elected to the seat Georgetown for the Nationalists. He was asked to join Louis Botha's cabinet as its Colonial Treasurer.

In May 1908, he was one of three cabinet members that represented the Transvaal Colony at the Intercolonial Customs and Railways Conference. The conference, with participants from the other three colonies, resolved the number of delegates from each colony that would draft the constitution for the Union of South Africa at a National Convention for presentation in parliament in London. Later he would be one of eight men that represented the Transvaal Colony in drafting the constitution between 1908 and 1909.

The Union of South Africa was created on 31 March 1910, with Louis Botha as its first prime minister with Hull joining the Botha cabinet as finance minister. The 1910 South African general election followed in September 1910. He resigned in 1912 after a dispute with Minister for Railways, J.W. Sauer over the latter's failure to tell cabinet about its excessive expenditure and tariff reductions. Botha reluctantly backed Sauer and Hull resigned his post. He would represent the constituency of Barberton from October 1910 until August 1915.

After leaving politics, Hull assisted in the formation of Anglo American to fund gold mining on the Far East Rand. He accompanied Ernest Oppenheimer to London in 1915 to organise finance for the new company with American investors fronted by Herbert C. Hoover and William L. Honnold. The Anglo American Corporation was formed in 1917 with £1 million capital. Hull would be appointed one of six directors on the board of the new company.

Hull used his political connection to Jan Smuts and Louis Botha to ensure that Consolidated Diamond Mines and Oppenheimer obtain the exclusive rights to alluvial diamonds in South West Africa (Namibia). Oppenheimer would accompany Botha to Versailles peace conference in 1919 that resulted in the Treaty of Versailles and the League of Nations that granted South Africa a mandate to administer South West Africa.

== Marriage ==
He had four sons and one daughter.

== Death ==
Hull died in Muizenberg, Cape Town in 1932.

Political offices
Preceded by	Minister of Finance; 1910–1912	Succeeded by Jan Smuts
