= Richard Solomon (barrister) =

South African attorney and legislator

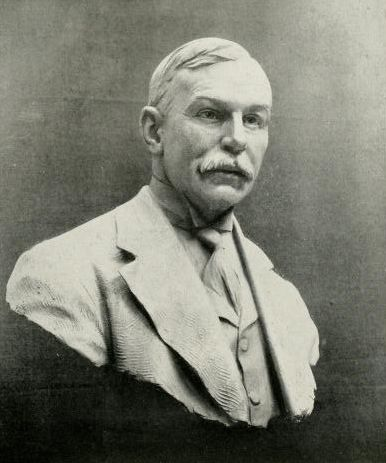
Bust by Francis Derwent Wood, commissioned posthumously for the Houses of Parliament, Cape Town.

Sir Richard Solomon, GCMG, KCB, KCVO, KC (18 October 1850 – 10 November 1913) was a South African attorney and legislator. He was a member of Parliament and the Attorney General of the Cape Colony and Attorney General, Lieutenant-Governor, and Agent-General of the Transvaal Colony. After serving as Agent-General of the Transvaal from 1907 to the creation of the Union of South Africa in 1910, Solomon was the first High Commissioner of South Africa to the United Kingdom to his death in 1913.

== Early life ==
Richard Solomon was born in 1850 in Cape Town, the third son of Rev. Edward Solomon and his wife, Jessie Matthews. His father was a missionary for the native population.

Solomon was part of a large and influential Cape family, originally of St Helenan Jewish descent, but who had converted to Anglicanism. He was baptised at one month old in Cape Town.

Members of the Solomon family were heavily involved in Southern African politics: Saul Solomon was his uncle, and his brothers were the Transvaal politician Edward Phillip Solomon, and judge and later Chief Justice of South Africa, Sir William Henry Solomon. He married Elizabeth Mary Walton in 1881 and they had one daughter.

Solomon was educated at the Bedford Public School in Cape Town and South African College. He furthered his studies at Peterhouse, Cambridge and was mathematical lecturer at the Royal Naval College, Greenwich (1876–1879), before being called to the Bar at the Inner Temple in 1879. Solomon was also adviser to Lord Rosmead's Royal Commission on the Administration of the Governor of Mauritius, Sir John Pope Hennessy in 1886, a member of the Native Law Commission and Chairman of the Mining Commission.

== Political and government career ==
Upon his return to the Cape Colony, Solomon was appointed legal adviser to the then newly formed De Beers Consolidated Mines and Cecil Rhodes in Kimberley. He was elected to the Parliament of the Cape of Good Hope for Kimberley in 1893, and was appointed Attorney-General of the Cape Colony from 1898 to 1900. He was knighted as a Knight Commander of the Order of St Michael and St George (KCMG) in 1901, on the occasion of the visit to the Cape of Good Hope of the Duke and Duchess of Cornwall and York (later King George V and Queen Mary).

From 1900, Solomon resigned as an MP and served as legal advisor to Lord Kitchener during the Second Boer War, and then to the Transvaal Administration of Lord Milner from 22 March 1901 as Attorney General. In a despatch from June 1902, Lord Kitchener wrote how "His quickness and his ability, joined to his intimate knowledge of South Africa and its people, have always been fully and loyally placed at my disposal." Following the peace treaty on 31 May 1902, on 21 June he was appointed Attorney General in the Transvaal Colony, and thus a member of the executive council of the governor, Lord Milner. Recruited by Milner to join a team of young administrators – known as "Milner's Kindergarten", Solomon was part of the work to govern and anglicise the British-occupied Transvaal. He represented the Transvaal at the Delhi Durbar in 1903 and on 10 July 1903 was made a Companion of the Order of the Bath (CB).

As Attorney General Solomon was the third-highest-ranking official in the colony, and in the absence of the Governor and the Lieutenant-Governor, Solomon was Administrator of the Government in 1904 and from 4 December 1905 to 2 October 1906. On 9 November 1905 he was made a Knight Commander of the Order of the Bath (KCB). On 23 March 1906, Solomon was appointed to succeed Sir Arthur Lawley as Lieutenant-Governor, with the Attorney General of the Orange River Colony, Herbert Francis Blaine, succeeding Solomon as Attorney General. On 17 August 1906, Solomon was appointed to be King's Counsel (KC) for the Transvaal Colony.

With Transvaal having been granted responsible self-government by letters patent on 6 December 1906, in early 1907 Solomon resigned his position in the colonial administration in order to run for election to the Transvaal Legislative Assembly at its first election on 20 February 1907. Solomon was aligned to the Transvaal National Association, of which his brother Edward was president, but also had ties to the Het Volk Party led by Louis Botha and Jan Smuts. Standing for the seat of South Central Pretoria, Solomon was unsuccessful against the Progressive Party candidate Sir Percy FitzPatrick, and his political career was over before it had begun.

Solomon's defeat was a disappointment to many liberals in the colony who had hoped to see a cabinet led by him, and the Governor, The Earl of Selbourne, wrote to the Colonial Office: "The clear majority which Het Volk has won over all other parties combined, together with the defeat of Sir Richard Solomon by Sir Percy Fitzpatrick, has of course made it necessary for me to send for General Botha, and I have very little doubt that he will form a Ministry consisting mainly, if not entirely, of members of his own party". With Het Volk and the Nationalists successful at the election, Solomon subsequently assisted with the formation of the first Transvaal Cabinet by way of a coalition between the Het Volk and Nationalist parties under Prime Minister Louis Botha.

== Later life ==
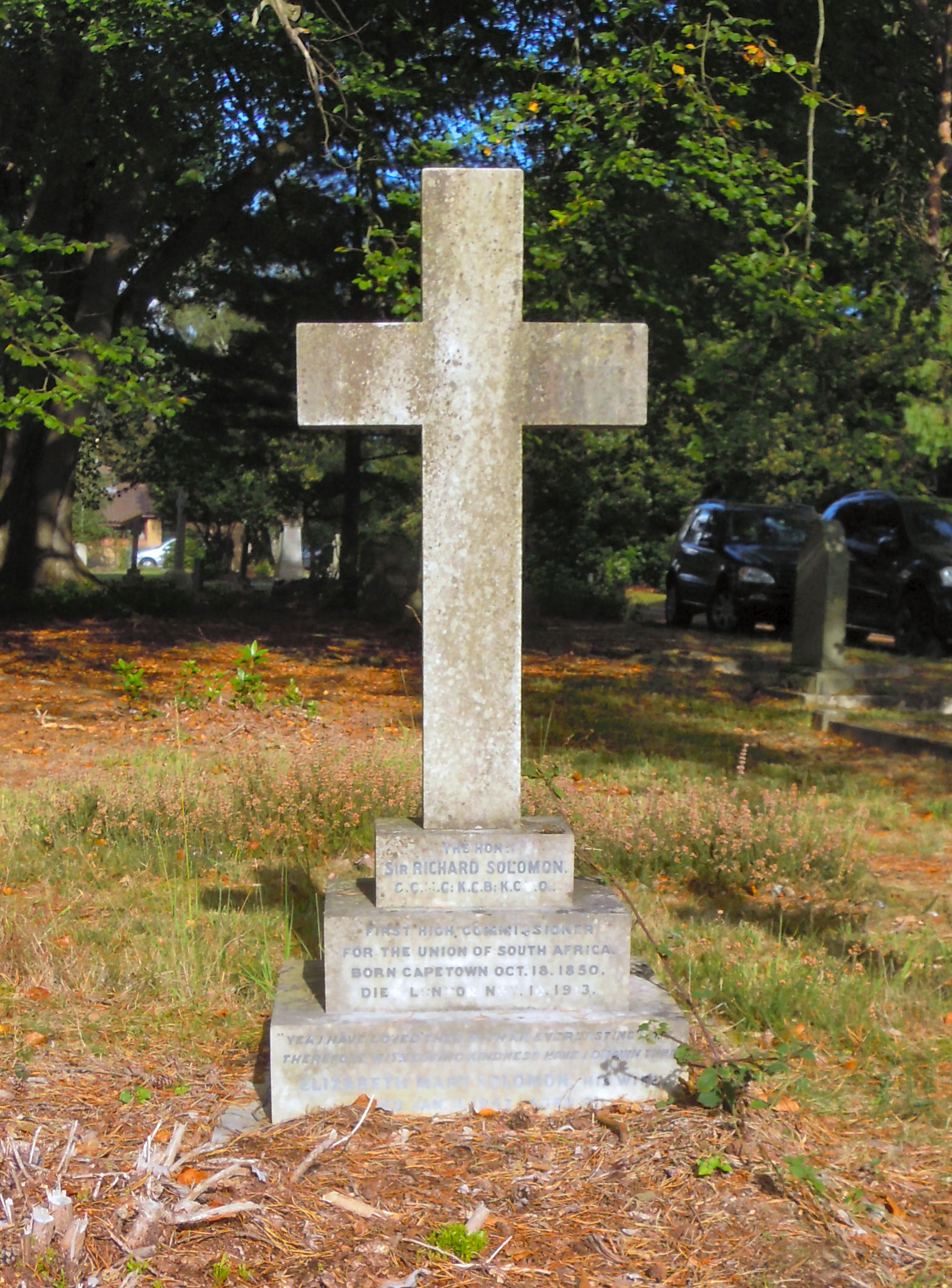
The grave of Sir Richard Solomon in Brookwood Cemetery.

After having declined to serve in the cabinet, Solomon was appointed by Botha to be Agent-General of the Colony in London and accompanied Botha to the Imperial Conference in London in April–May 1907. As Agent-General Solomon was responsible to advocating for financial loans, and presented the Cullinan Diamond to King Edward VII which had been purchased by the Transvaal Government to present to the King for his 66th birthday, and was appointed a Knight Commander of the Royal Victorian Order (KCVO) by the King as a result.

With the creation of the Union of South Africa on 31 May 1910, the Transvaal Colony ceased to exist and the first Prime Minister of South Africa, Louis Botha, appointed Solomon to serve as the first High Commissioner for South Africa in London from 1910. In commemoration of his service in the Cape Colony legislature and the establishment of South Africa, he was granted the use of the title "The Honourable" for life and on 19 June 1911, Solomon was appointed as a Knight Grand Cross of the Order of St Michael and St George (GCMG). He was a member of the Reform Club and Athenaeum Club. Solomon served as High Commissioner until his death aged 63 on 10 November 1913, and was buried in Brookwood Cemetery.

Assembly seats
Preceded by	Member of Parliament for Kimberley; 1893–1900	Succeeded by Leander Starr Jameson
Political offices
Preceded by Thomas Graham	Attorney General of the Cape Colony; 1898–1900	Succeeded by James Rose Innes
Government offices
Preceded by Jan Smuts as State Attorney of the South African Republic	Attorney General of the Transvaal; 1901–1906	Succeeded by Herbert Francis Blaine
Preceded by Sir Arthur Lawley	Lieutenant-Governor of the Transvaal; 1906–1907	Colony merged into South Africa
Diplomatic posts
New title	Agent-General for the Transvaal; 1907–1910	Colony merged into South Africa
New title	High Commissioner of South Africa to the United Kingdom; 1910–1913	Succeeded by Sir David Graaff
