= Barberton (House of Assembly of South Africa constituency) =

- Former constituency for the South African House of Assembly
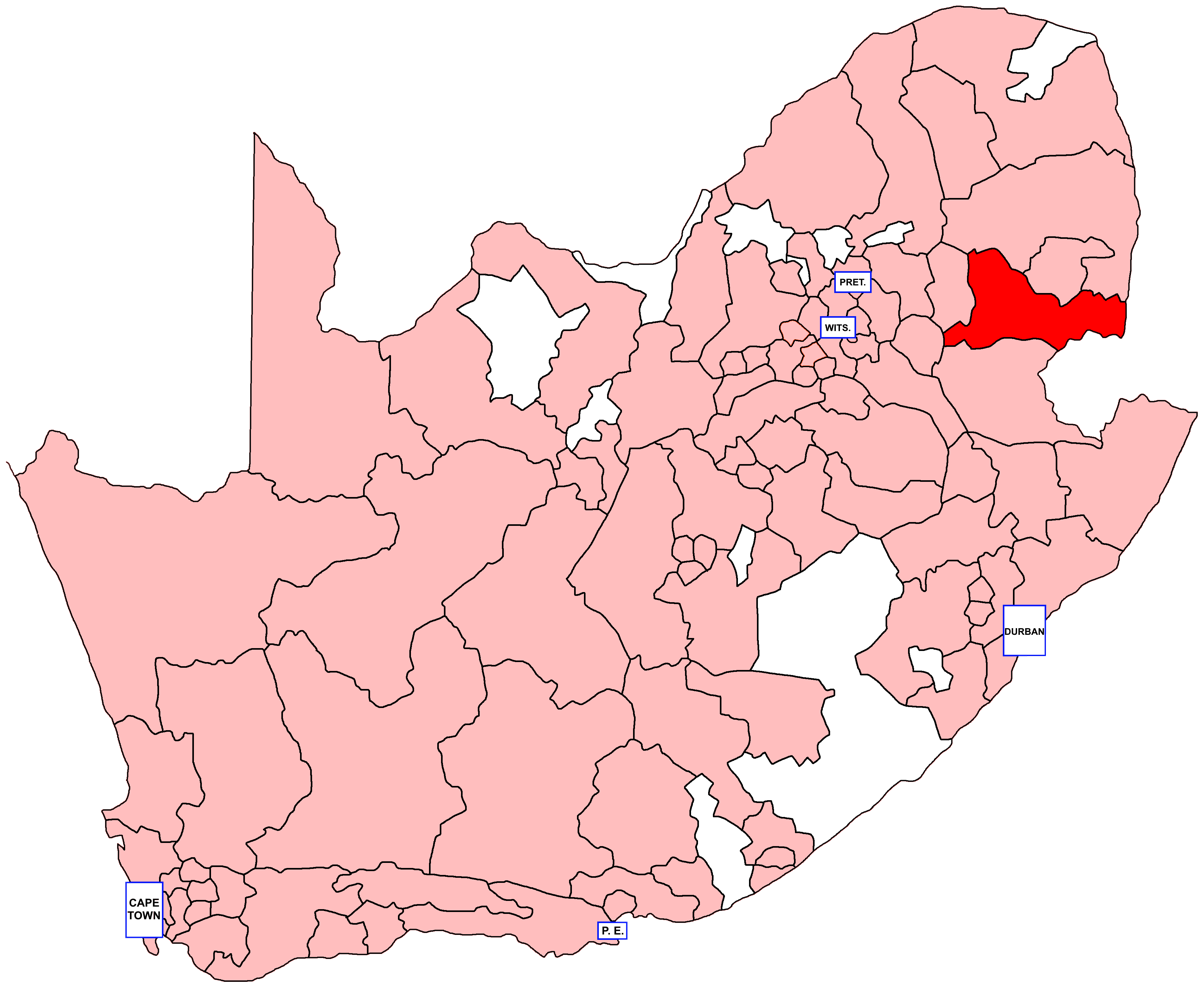
- Location of Barberton within South Africa (1981)
- Province: Transvaal
- Electorate: 18,092 (1989)

Former constituency
- Created: 1910; 1974
- Abolished: 1958; 1994
- Number of members: 1
- Last MHA: Casper Uys (CP)
- Replaced by: Nelspruit (1958); Mpumalanga (1994)

Barberton was a constituency in the Transvaal Province of South Africa, which existed from 1910 to 1958 and from 1974 to 1994. Named after the town of Barberton, it covered a part of the eastern Transvaal along the border with Eswatini. Throughout its existence it elected one member to the House of Assembly and one to the Transvaal Provincial Council.

== Franchise notes ==
When the Union of South Africa was formed in 1910, the electoral qualifications in use in each pre-existing colony were kept in place. In the Transvaal Colony, and its predecessor the South African Republic, the vote was restricted to white men, and as such, elections in the Transvaal Province were held on a whites-only franchise from the beginning. The franchise was also restricted by property and education qualifications until the 1933 general election, following the passage of the Women's Enfranchisement Act, 1930 and the Franchise Laws Amendment Act, 1931. From then on, the franchise was given to all white citizens aged 21 or over. Non-whites remained disenfranchised until the end of apartheid and the introduction of universal suffrage in 1994.

== History ==
Like most of the rural Transvaal, Barberton had a largely Afrikaans-speaking electorate. In its first iteration, it was a marginal seat with a slight lean towards the South African Party, whose leader Jan Smuts was popular in the Transvaal. Its first MP, Joseph Petrus Jooste, resigned on election night, sparking South Africa's first (uncontested) by-election, although he would be elected as a member of the Transvaal Provincial Council in 1916. Deneys Reitz, a protégé of Smuts, was first elected for Barberton in 1929 and served as a cabinet minister starting in 1935. He resigned in 1943 to take up appointment as High Commissioner in London, and in 1948, the seat was one of many in the Transvaal to fall to the Herenigde Nasionale Party. Its final MP, Wessel Hendrik Faurie, was elected for the new seat of Nelspruit on Barberton's abolition in 1958.

In 1974, Barberton was recreated to exist alongside Nelspruit, and by this time it was very safe for the governing party. Its only MP in its second iteration, Casper Uys, defected to Andries Treurnicht's Conservative Party on its formation in 1982, and was re-elected under this label in both 1987 and 1989.

== Members ==
Election	Member	Party
1910	Joseph Petrus Jooste	Het Volk
1910 by	Henry Charles Hulll	Het Volk
1915	Johannes Hermanus Grobler	South African
1920	Joachim Christoffel Fourie	South African
1921	Joachim Christoffel Fourie	South African
1924	Willem Hendrik Rood	National
1929	Deneys Reitz	South African
1933	Deneys Reitz	South African
1934	Deneys Reitz	United
1938	Deneys Reitz	United
1943 by	Louis Johannes Raubenheimer	United
1943	Louis Johannes Raubenheimer	United
1948	Wessel Hendrik Faurie	HNP
1953	Wessel Hendrik Faurie	National
1958	Constituency abolished	

Election	Member	Party
1974	Casper Uys	National
1977	Casper Uys	National
1981	Casper Uys	National
1982	Casper Uys	Conservative
1987	Casper Uys	Conservative
1989	Casper Uys	Conservative
1994	Constituency abolished	

== Detailed results ==
=== Elections in the 1910s ===
General election 1910: Barberton
Party	Candidate	Votes	%	±%
Het Volk	Joseph Petrus Jooste	836	62.0	New
Unionist	D. Drew	513	38.0	New
Majority		323	24.0	N/A
Het Volk win (new seat)				

Barberton by-election, 20 October 1910
Party	Candidate	Votes	%	±%
Het Volk	Henry Charles Hull	Unopposed		
Het Volk hold				

General election 1915: Barberton
Party	Candidate	Votes	%	±%
South African	J. H. Grobler	1,124	68.3	+6.3
National	J. L. Malan	522	31.7	New
Majority		602	36.6	N/A
Turnout		1,646	68.3	N/A
South African hold		Swing	N/A	

=== Elections in the 1920s ===
General election 1920: Barberton
Party	Candidate	Votes	%	±%
South African	Joachim Christoffel Fourie	1,009	55.5	−12.8
National	Johannes Lodewicus Malan	809	44.5	+12.8
Majority		200	11.0	−25.6
Turnout		1,818	63.2	−5.1
South African hold		Swing	-12.8	

General election 1921: Barberton
Party	Candidate	Votes	%	±%
South African	Joachim Christoffel Fourie	1,153	56.8	+1.3
National	Johannes Lodewicus Malan	876	43.2	−1.3
Majority		277	13.6	+2.6
Turnout		2,029	64.8	+1.6
South African hold		Swing	+1.3	

General election 1924: Barberton
Party	Candidate	Votes	%	±%
National	W. H. Rood	1,180	50.8	+7.6
South African	J. C. Fourie	1,131	48.7	−8.1
Rejected ballots		12	0.5	N/A
Majority		49	2.1	N/A
Turnout		2,323	80.0	+15.2
National gain from South African		Swing	+7.9	

General election 1929: Barberton
Party	Candidate	Votes	%	±%
South African	Deneys Reitz	1,095	59.3	+10.6
National	C. L. Worral	732	39.6	−11.2
Rejected ballots		20	1.1	+0.6
Majority		363	19.7	N/A
Turnout		2,323	80.0	+15.2
South African gain from National		Swing	+10.9	

=== Elections in the 1930s ===
General election 1933: Barberton
Party	Candidate	Votes	%	±%
South African	Deneys Reitz	Unopposed		
South African hold				

General election 1938: Barberton
Party	Candidate	Votes	%	±%
United	Deneys Reitz	2,574	67.6	N/A
Purified National	W. C. J. Brink	1,193	31.3	New
Rejected ballots		39	1.1	N/A
Majority		1,381	36.3	N/A
Turnout		3,806	73.3	N/A
United hold		Swing	N/A	

=== Elections in the 1940s ===
Barberton by-election, 16 February 1943
Party	Candidate	Votes	%	±%
United	Louis Johannes Raubenheimer	2,390	72.6	+5.0
Independent	H. S. Webb	873	26.5	New
Rejected ballots		31	0.9	-0.2
Majority		1,517	46.1	N/A
Turnout		3,294	54.9	−18.4
United hold		Swing	N/A	
