= National Convention (South Africa) =

Constitutional convention

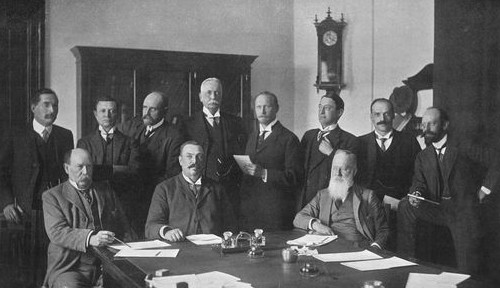
The first ministry of the Union of South Africa under Prime Minister Louis Botha, in 1910. The front row - JW Sauer, Botha, and Abraham Fischer (left to right) - were all present at the National Convention, and JBM Hertzog (far left), FR Moor (second from left), JC Smuts (fourth from right), Henry Charles Hull (third from right) and FS Malan (second from right) were also present.

The National Convention (Dutch: Nationale Conventie, Afrikaans: Nasionale Konvensie), also known as the Convention on the Closer Union of South Africa or the Closer Union Convention, was a constitutional convention held between 1908 and 1909 in Durban (12 October to 5 November 1908), Cape Town (23 November to 18 December 1908, 11 January to 3 February 1909) and Bloemfontein (3 May to 11 May 1909). The convention led to the adoption of the South Africa Act 1909 by the British Parliament and thus to the creation of the Union of South Africa. The four colonies of the area that would become South Africa - the Cape Colony, Natal Colony, the Orange River Colony and the Transvaal Colony - were represented at the convention, along with a delegation from Rhodesia. There were 33 delegates in total, with the Cape being represented by 12, the Transvaal eight, the Orange River five, Natal five, and Rhodesia three. The convention was held behind closed doors, in the fear that a public affair would lead delegates to refuse compromising on contentious areas of disagreement. All the delegates were white men, a third of them were farmers, ten were lawyers, and some were academics. Two-thirds had fought on either side of the Second Boer War.

By the end of the convention, the delegates had drawn up a constitution that would, subject to some amendments by the British government, become the South Africa Act, which was South Africa's constitution between 1910 and 1961, when the country became a republic under the Constitution of 1961.

== Background ==
The first attempt to establish a union of the colonies of Southern Africa was in 1858, when burghers of the Orange Free State sent a petition to Sir George Grey, the then Governor of the Cape Colony, requesting the formation of a "compact union" including the Free State, the Cape, and Natal (but excluding the Transvaal). The Volksraad of the Orange Free State followed up the petition with a resolution requesting the State President, Jacobus Nicolaas Boshoff, to communicate with Grey and proposing a conference. When Grey communicated this to the Colonial Secretary, Edward Bulwer-Lytton in London, Lytton replied that the British government was not prepared to resume sovereignty over the Free State, which it had previously controlled as the Orange River Sovereignty between 1848 and 1854.

In 1871, the Cape House of Assembly passed a resolution approving of the idea of union, and in 1872 the House of Commons similarly resolved that it would be "desirable" for a confederation between the colonies and republics of South Africa to be established. In 1874, Lord Henry Carnarvon, who had introduced the British North America Act, sent James Anthony Froude to report on the situation in the region. Froude's presence was, however, resented, due to the South Africans' desire "that union should come from within, not dictated by Downing Street". Froude's report led to the British Parliament passing the South Africa Act, 1877, "for the Union under one Government of such of the South African Colonies and States as may agree thereto". It would have modeled the South African union on the Canadian model, but "South Africa had hardly been consulted" in its promulgation and no Cape parliamentarians were willing to sponsor it locally. The Act expired in August 1882, without being implemented.

The First Boer War (1880 to 1881) intervened in the journey toward union, and it was not until 1889 when a customs union was formed between the Cape and the Free State, which were joined in 1899 by the other territories with the exception of the Transvaal. The Second Boer War (1899 to 1902), which the British won, led to the formerly-independent Boer republics becoming British colonies. The customs union was renewed in 1903, now including the Transvaal.

In 1907, the High Commissioner for Southern Africa, Lord William Selborne was tasked with preparing a report on the disunion of the colonies, titled Review of the Present Mutual Relations of the British South African Colonies, described as an equivalent of the Durham Report. The report regarded the disunion in the region as artificial, and noted the shared "Native problem" and fiscal and economic matters. At this time the white population of the four colonies stood at around one million, with natives numbering five million.

In May 1908, the Intercolonial Customs and Railways Conference met to discuss the issue of union as well as railway and customs. Frederick Robert Moor, Prime Minister of Natal, was chosen as chairman of the conference. Each of the four self-governing colonies had three representatives: John Xavier Merriman, Jacobus Wilhelmus Sauer, and Francois Stephanus Malan representing the Cape Colony; Moor, Charles O'Grady Gubbins, and Charles Hitchins representing the Natal Colony; Louis Botha, Jan Christiaan Smuts, and Henry Charles Hull representing the Transvaal Colony; and Abraham Fischer, James Barry Munnik Hertzog, and Alfred Ernest William Ramsbottom [af] representing the Orange River Colony. Rhodesia and the Portuguese province of Mozambique participated on the understanding that their delegates could not vote on or discuss anything that did not concern their territories directly or which they were not legally competent to address. Lewis Loyd Michell, Francis James Newton, and EC Baxter represented Rhodesia; and TAG Rosado and BM d'Almeida represented Mozambique. The conference unanimously accepted Smuts' motions, which read as follows:

"(a) That in the opinion of this Conference the best interests and the permanent prosperity of South Africa can only be secured by an early union, under the Crown of Great Britain, of the several self-governing Colonies;

(b) that to the union contemplated in the foregoing resolution Rhodesia shall be entitled to admission at such time and on such conditions as may hereafter be agreed upon;

(c) that the members of this Conference agree to submit the foregoing resolutions to the Legislatures of their respective Colonies, and to take such steps as may be necessary to obtain their consent to the appointment of delegates to a National South African Convention, whose object shall be to consider and report on the most desirable form of South African Union and to prepare a draft constitution;

(d) the Convention shall consist of not more than (12) twelve delegates from the Cape Colony, not more than (8) eight delegates from the Transvaal, not more than (5) five delegates from Natal and the Orange River Colony respectively, and it shall meet as soon as convenient after the next Sessions of all the Parliaments; provided that as soon as at least two Colonies shall have appointed their delegates the Convention shall be considered as constituted;

(e) the Convention shall publish the draft constitution as soon as possible, and shall, in consultation with the Governments of the self-governing Colonies, determine the further steps to be taken in reference thereto;

(f) in the Convention the voting shall be per capita and not by States. A Chairman shall be elected from the members who shall have the right of speaking and voting, and in the event of an equality of votes shall have a casting vote."

At this time public opinion was in favor of a union between the colonies, with the business community and especially the mining houses being convinced of the financial and economic benefits union might entail. Disunion was widely blamed as a cause of much of the region's social and economic woes. The Closer Union Society was founded in Cape Town in mid-1908, with former Cape prime minister William Philip Schreiner as its president. The Society's aim was "to encourage the formation of similar societies throughout Cape Colony and South Africa and to disseminate information on all aspects and systems of closer Union", with several closer union societies being established across the colonies. It published The Framework of Union in 1908 which explained the constitutional structures of the United States, Canada, Australia, Germany and Switzerland, with a view to propagate the idea of union among South Africans. Mahatma Gandhi spoke at an event of the Transvaal Closer Union Society on the topic of immigration law.

== Delegates ==
The delegates to the National Convention were:

- Cape of Good Hope (12)
  - John de Villiers - Chief Justice and President of the Legislative Council (President of the Convention)
  - John Xavier Merriman - Prime Minister and Treasurer, and South African Party MP for Victoria West and Stellenbosch
  - Jacobus Wilhelmus Sauer - Commissioner of Public Works and South African Party MP for Aliwal North and George
  - Francois Stephanus Malan - Secretary for Agriculture and South African Party MP for Malmesbury
  - Leander Starr Jameson - Leader of the Progressive Party and MP for Kimberley and Grahamstown
  - Edgar Harris Walton - Progressive Party MP for Port Elizabeth and owner-editor of the Eastern Province Herald
  - Thomas Smartt - Progressive Party MP for Fort Beaufort
  - Col. Walter Ernest Mortimer Stanford - Independent MP for Tembuland
  - John William Jagger [af] - Progressive Party MP for Cape Town
  - Hercules Christiaan van Heerden - Chairman of the Afrikaner Bond and South African Party MP for Cradock
  - Gysbert Henry Maasdorp - South African Party MP for Graaff Reinet
  - Johannes Hendricus Meiring Beck - South African Party MP for Worcester
- Natal (5)
  - Frederick Robert Moor - Prime Minister and Minister of Native Affairs, and MP for Weenen
  - Col. Edward Mackenzie Greene - Minister of Railways and Harbours and MP for Lions River
  - Thomas Hyslop - MP for Umgeni
  - Charles John Smythe - MP for Lions River
  - William Boase Morcom* - MP for Pietermartizburg
  - Thomas Watt* - MP for Newcastle
- Transvaal (8)
  - Gen. Louis Botha - Prime Minister and Het Volk MP for Standerton, Chairman of Het Volk
  - Gen. Jan Christiaan Smuts - Colonial Secretary and Het Volk MP for Wonderboom
  - Henry Charles Hull - Colonial Treasurer and National Association MP for Georgetown
  - George Herbert Farrar - Leader of the Opposition and Progressive Association MP for Boksburg East
  - James Percy Fitzpatrick - Progressive Association MP for Pretoria South Central
  - Henry Lill Lindsay - Progressive Association MP for Troyeville
  - Gen. Schalk Willem Burger - Het Volk MP for Lydenburg South
  - Gen. Jacobus Herculaas de la Rey - Het Volk MP for Ventersdorp
- Orange River (5)
  - Abraham Fischer - Prime Minister and Colonial Secretary, and Orangia Unie [af] MP for Bethlehem
  - Martinus Theunis Steyn - former State President (Vice-President of the Convention)
  - Gen. James Barry Munnik Hertzog - Attorney-General and Minister of Education, Orangia Unie MP for Smithfield
  - Gen. Christiaan Rudolf de Wet - Minister of Agriculture and Orangia Unie MP for Vredefort
  - Albert Browne - Constitutionalist Party Member of the Legislative Council
- Rhodesia (3)
  - William Henry Milton - Administrator and President of the Executive and Legislative Councils
  - Charles Patrick John Coghlan - Member of the Legislative Council
  - Lewis Lloyd Michell - former Minister without Portfolio, Cape Colony

* Thomas Watt replaced William Boase Morcom at the National Convention on 11 January 1909.

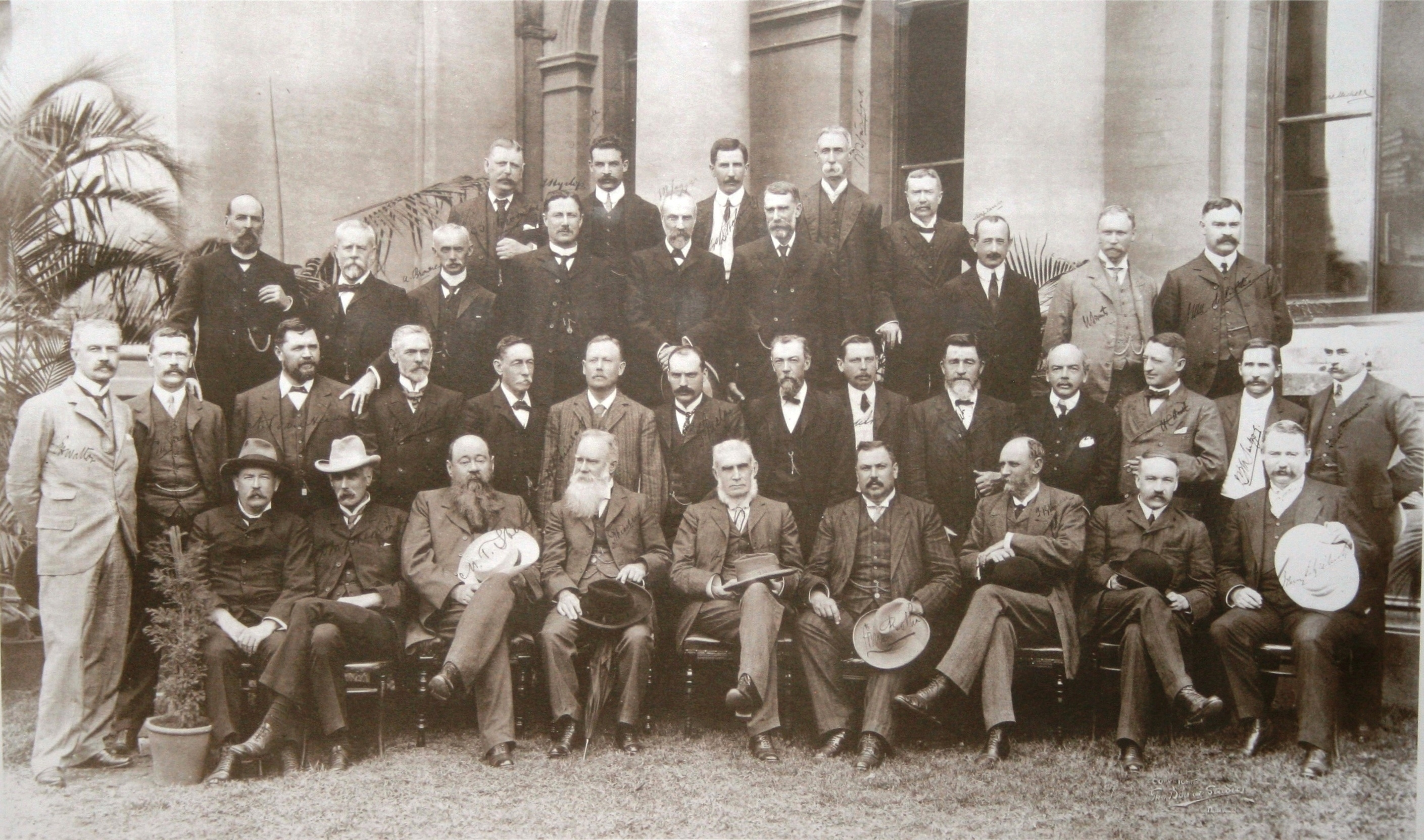
The delegates in Durban, 1908

== Contentious issues ==
The whole people of South Africa are looking to you to devise for them a scheme which will unite them in a threat nation, a nation of white people, maintaining their virility and increasing in numbers, ruling themselves and a contented native population in the common interests of all, a nation governed in such a way that the vast resources of the land may be developed and its productiveness may be constantly increased, in such a way that a world commerce may be established commensurate with the favourable position of the country between western and eastern oceans and with the commercial instincts of its people descended from the two historic trading nations of Europe, in such a way that peace and good order may be continuously maintained within and security provided against attack from without, so that the new commonwealth may add to and not draw on the strength of the Empire of which it will form part, in such a way that education and the arts and sciences may advance so that in culture as in strength South Africa may be among the foremost nations of the world, and in such a way as to carry on through the coming centuries the ideals of honesty and justice, of courage and purity which made great the nations from which British and Dutch in South Africa have sprung.

— Opening remarks by Matthew Nathan, Governor of Natal, quoted in the Minutes of the National Convention.

The main areas of contention at the National Convention were the following, with the first three being the most controversial:

- Whether South Africa would be a federation or a unitary state.
- What the franchise of the new union would be, with particular regard to the status of the black and coloured races.
- How South Africa would be divided into administrative divisions, especially the provinces.
- The status of the two dominant European languages, Dutch (later Afrikaans) and English.
- Where the capital city would be located.

The convention adopted equality between Dutch and English, with both becoming official languages of the new South Africa. It was also decided that South Africa would have three capital cities: Cape Town would host the national Parliament, Pretoria would host the civil service, and the apex court would be located in Bloemfontein. Natal's consolation prize was securing a lucrative railway agreement for which it had been pressing since 1903.

=== Federal or unitary? ===
Leading up to the convention, most sought a federal dispensation. The Transvaal delegation was concerned that the Transvaal would ultimately be financially responsible for all the other provinces, given that its "treasury was full and overflowing, and the treasuries of the other three colonies were empty, faced with the problem of balancing their budgets". Natal and the Orange River feared that, because they were the two smaller territories, the voting power of the Cape and the Transvaal would negate their representation. Natal, having been predominantly English among its white inhabitants and being the most fervent supporter of federalism, specifically feared that a Dutch culture and language culture would be forced upon it. The Cape sought to protect the qualified franchise it had adopted which allowed black and coloureds to stand for elections and vote.

Jan Smuts was the primary sponsor of the idea that South Africa should be a unitary state. He criticized the American federal model as "ineffective for the essential purpose of civilized government" because individual states could make their own law, and South Africa had by that time already experienced too much legislative confusion, in Smuts' view. A strict federal model could also not respond quickly enough to pressing issues. Smuts also regarded Canadian federalism as emphasizing the jealousies and differences of race and religion, and felt Australian federalism led to too much friction between the states. Smuts believed that a unitary state would allow South Africans to overcome the friction and racial strife they had thereinto experienced.

But it was mainly the question of a national native policy that decided the issue, with the "unifiers" arguing that a strong central government would be necessary for dealing with this problem. South Africa thus became a unitary state with a single central Parliament that has "unlimited legislative authority". Given this parliamentary sovereignty, the constitution itself could be amended with a simple majority of both houses of Parliament, with the potential exception of two "entrenched" clauses governing the equality of languages and the qualified franchise in the Cape.

=== Franchise ===
Before unification, each of the four colonies that would become South Africa had their own franchise policy. The Cape had a franchise qualified by property and wages. By the time of the convention, there were 22,784 black and coloured voters in the Cape, out of a total electorate of 152,221. Natal had a similar policy with a higher property threshold, having had 200 black and coloured voters on the roll out of a total electorate of 22,686. In the Transvaal and Orange River, only white men could vote or stand for election.

Four potential solutions to the franchise problem were tabled at the convention:

- The Cape qualified franchise would be extended to all of South Africa.
- A standardized "civilization test" would be adopted for all voters.
- A single "colour-line" franchise, such as in the Transvaal and Orange River, would be adopted for all of South Africa.
- The Cape qualified franchise would be left alone, but the future Union Parliament would be allowed to decide the matter in the future.

A standardized "civilization test" would have meant legal equality between whites, blacks and coloureds in South Africa, which was unacceptable to the conservative electorate in the Transvaal, Orange River and Natal. Furthermore, neither the Cape nor the two former Boer republics were willing to compromise on their respective franchise systems. This led to the fourth option being adopted, with the Cape qualified franchise receiving constitutional protection in section 35 of the South Africa Act until such a time as it is amended by a joint sitting of Parliament with a supporting vote of two-thirds of the members. This victory for the Cape delegation did however not extend to the ability of blacks and coloureds to sit in Parliament or provincial councils. While they could thus continue to vote in the Cape, blacks and coloureds could no longer be elected to legislative office.

=== Administrative divisions ===
As South Africa was to be a unitary rather than a federal state, the provinces would have no legislatures of their own, but instead a system of provincial councils wholly subordinate to the national Parliament. No conflict would thus be possible between the councils and Parliament, as the provinces had no exclusive powers - only those assigned to them by the sovereign legislature.

In their desire to keep the provincial council non-partisan, the delegates sought to model it largely on that of Switzerland. In this regard, choosing the executive committee of the council was made to be through proportional representation, with the executive Administrator of each province being independently appointed.

Education was one of the key areas of jurisdiction added to the provincial council system, primarily for the fears raised by Natal and the Orange River that their language rights would be undermined. Their own provincial councils could thus set provincial language standards in education.

This desire for non-partisanship did not come to fruition, however, as every provincial election since the adoption of the South Africa Act would be fought along party political lines.

== Adoption ==
I do not see how a scheme of Union could be carried through without the assistance and the intervention of the Imperial Parliament. That is the only legislature which, in theory, has the power of legislating for South Africa as a whole... You say that we should consider carefully "whether the Constitution should not be our own Act approved of by the Crown", but without the intervention of the Imperial Parliament there would have to be several identical Colonial Acts of Parliament and the fatal objection would remain that in order to effect the Union, each of these Acts by dealing with the affairs of other colonies, would be ultra vires of the legislature which passed it. No such objection would exist to an Imperial Parliament Act.

— Extract from a letter by John de Villiers to John Merriman. Eric A. Walker, Lord de Villiers and His Times: South Africa 1842—1914. Constable, London, 1925.

After the draft constitution was formulated, it was tabled before the respective colonial legislatures for approval. Stephen Leacock wrote that its acceptance in the Transvaal was a foregone conclusion, as the dominant political parties in the legislature had both agreed to the constitution beforehand. The Cape Parliament, on the other hand, did propose some amendments, including the scrapping of the proportional representation system as adopted at the convention, the scrapping of which the Orange River Colony agreed with. Leacock continues:

"In Natal, which as an ultra-British and ultra-loyal colony, was generally supposed to be in fear of union, many amendments were offered. The convention then met again at Bloemfontein, made certain changes in the draft of the constitution, and again submitted the document to the colonies. This time it was accepted. Only in Natal was it thought necessary to take a popular vote, and here, contrary to expectation, the people voted heavily in favor of union."

The Cape submitted 12 amendments, Natal 17 (in another attempt to secure a federal arrangement), and the Orange River three. 40 amendments were subsequently made by the convention between 3 and 11 May 1909 in Bloemfontein. The final approval by the colonial governments happened between May and June. The Natal referendum returned 11,121 votes in favor of the draft constitution and 3,701 against.

The various colonial governments, after having approved the draft, agreed with the resolution taken at the convention that the constitution be referred to the British Parliament for adoption, in which would become the South Africa Act 1909. Each colonial legislature appointed delegates to go to London, empowered to agree to changes "not inconsistent with the provisions and principles of the draft act". In London, 53 amendments were made to the bill, most of which were procedural and not substantive, and Parliament passed the constitution in essentially the same form it had been submitted by the National Convention. It received royal assent on 20 September 1909 and the Union of South Africa came into being on 31 May 1910, "exactly eight years to the day on which the Peace of Vereeniging was signed".

== Legacy ==
The decision of the National Convention to choose a unitary rather than a federal framework under a regime of parliamentary sovereignty led to the central government, and moreover the central Parliament, not having a specified list of enumerated powers, instead being able to govern essentially as it pleased over the whole of the country. This led to Afrikaners fearing language inequality in the years after the constitution was adopted, despite the equality provisions in the South Africa Act. In turn, this would partly cause Hertzog to establish the National Party in 1912. It also led to the "flag controversy" of 1926 and 1927, and the imposition of racial apartheid by the National Party from 1948 onward.

That the South Africa Act 1909 was enacted by the British Parliament also led to controversy in later years, with some arguing that the constitution was "foisted on South Africa by a foreign parliament".

In 1951, the National Party introduced the Separate Representation of Voters Act, which intended to remove coloured voters from the voters' roll. Because Parliament was legally sovereign, and because the Statute of Westminster had already come into effect, government felt it was lawful to change the entrenched clauses without adhering to the requirements of the South Africa Act (i.e. both houses of Parliament must sit jointly and pass an amendment with a two-thirds majority). The Separate Representation of Voters Act thus passed without the requisite two-thirds majority required, and without both houses sitting together, to amend the Cape qualified franchise, plunging South Africa into a constitutional crisis that would continue until 1955.

The Convention for a Democratic South Africa (Codesa), which transpired between 1991 and 1993 and led to the end of the apartheid system, was the second constitutional convention that occurred in South Africa to draft a new constitution. It led to the adoption of the 1993 "interim" Constitution, and at the same time the end of the parliamentary sovereignty that had started in 1910 when the South Africa Act came into being.

== See also ==
- Comparable acts in Dominion nation-building:
  - New Zealand Constitution Act 1852
  - Canadian Confederation (1867)
  - Federation of Australia (1901)
  - Anglo-Irish Treaty of 1921
  - Indian Independence Act 1947
  - Ceylon Independence Act 1947
