= William Frederick Nkomo =

South African doctor, community leader, political activist and teacher

William Frederick Nkomo BA, BSc, MBBCh
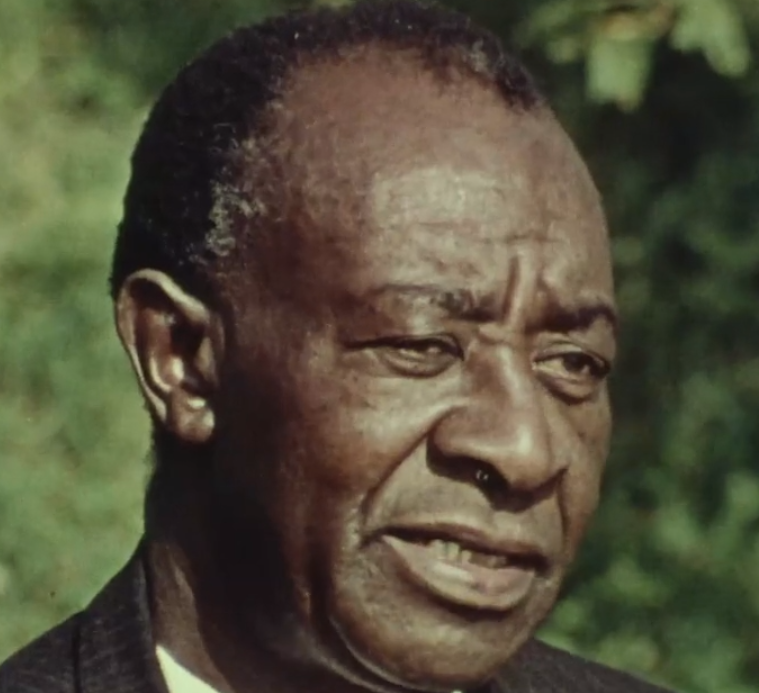
- Born: William Frederick Nkomo; 1915; Makapanstad, Transvaal; Union of South Africa
- Died: March 26, 1972; Pretoria, Transvaal; Republic of South Africa
- Education: St Peter's Secondary School, Rosettenville; Healdtown Training Institution; University of Fort Hare; University of South Africa; University of the Witwatersrand, Johannesburg
- Occupations: Medical doctor, teacher, political activist
- Political party: African National Congress
- Movement: Black Consciousness Movement; Moral Re-Armament Movement, South African Institute of Race Relations
- Children: Abe Nkomo

William Frederick Nkomo (1915–1972) was a South African medical doctor, community leader, political activist and teacher from Pretoria. He was the founding chairman of the African National Congress Youth League. While at the University of the Witwatersrand, Nkomo was the first black student to serve on the Students Representative Committee.

After graduation, he practiced as a teacher and medical doctor in various parts of Pretoria. He was later also involved in the Moral Re-Armament Movement. He was also elected president of the South African Institute of Race Relations, and was a steward of the Methodist Church and Trustee of the Bantu Welfare Trust.

== Early life and education ==
William Frederick Nkomo was born in Makapanstad, Transvaal in 1915. He was the son of a Methodist Minister, Reverend Abraham Nkomo. Nkomo attended primary school in Mahikeng and Klerksdorp, studied for his secondary education at St Peter's School in Rosettenville and matriculated at Healdtown Institute in the Eastern Cape.

Nkomo studied at the South African Native College (University of Fort Hare) and obtained a BA degree from the University of South Africa. He studied medicine on a scholarship at the University of the Witwatersrand in 1941 and did his internship at McCords Hospital in Durban. He practiced in Lady Selborne and Atteridgeville in Pretoria.

== Political activism ==
Nkomo joined the African National Congress in the early 1940s. In 1944, he helped found the ANC Youth League with Nelson Mandela, Anton Lembede, Ashley Peter Mda, Walter Sisulu and Oliver Tambo. He later relinquished his position as provisional chairman of the league to complete his medical studies. In 1956, due to his militance, he was summarily expelled by the party. In the 1960s he became associated with the Black Consciousness Movement.

As documented in Frank Buchman's Legacy, the Seeds of Change for Africa the authors Peter Hannon and Suzan Burrell write that, "WF Nkomo had been labelled a communist and he in turn viewed whites as Fascists”. However Nkomo's activism was in search for equality within South Africa and believed that a future bloodbath within his country be avoided.

Nkomo heard George Daneel, a former Springbok, Dutch Reformed Church priest and anti-apartheid activist, speak positively about change at a Moral Re-Armament multiracial conference in Lusaka. Daneel spoke publicly "That it was the feelings of racial superiority in white men like himself that were creating the conditions for producing bloody revolution. He said that he had been wrong and that he was giving his life to work for a South Africa where all had a full and equal part". In response Nkomo stated: "I have always been a revolutionary, and I have spent much of my life in the struggle for the liberation of my people. Here I see white men change, and black men change, and I myself have decided to change. I realise that I cannot love my people unless I am prepared to fight for them in a new dimension, free of bitterness and hate".

In pursuance of the strategy of non-violence he became a member of the Moral Re-Armament movement after attending its conference in Caux, Switzerland in 1953. To promote peace, he featured in two films (one on him, called A Man For All People) and another with leaders like Kwame Nkrumah, Nnamdi Azikiwe, Jomo Kenyatta and Manase Moerane.

Following the Sharpeville massacre in 1961, Nkomo was a mediator between the government and the victims. He was one of the leaders who discussed the political situation in South Africa with Dag Hammarskjöld who was Secretary General of the United Nations during his visit to this country in January 1961.

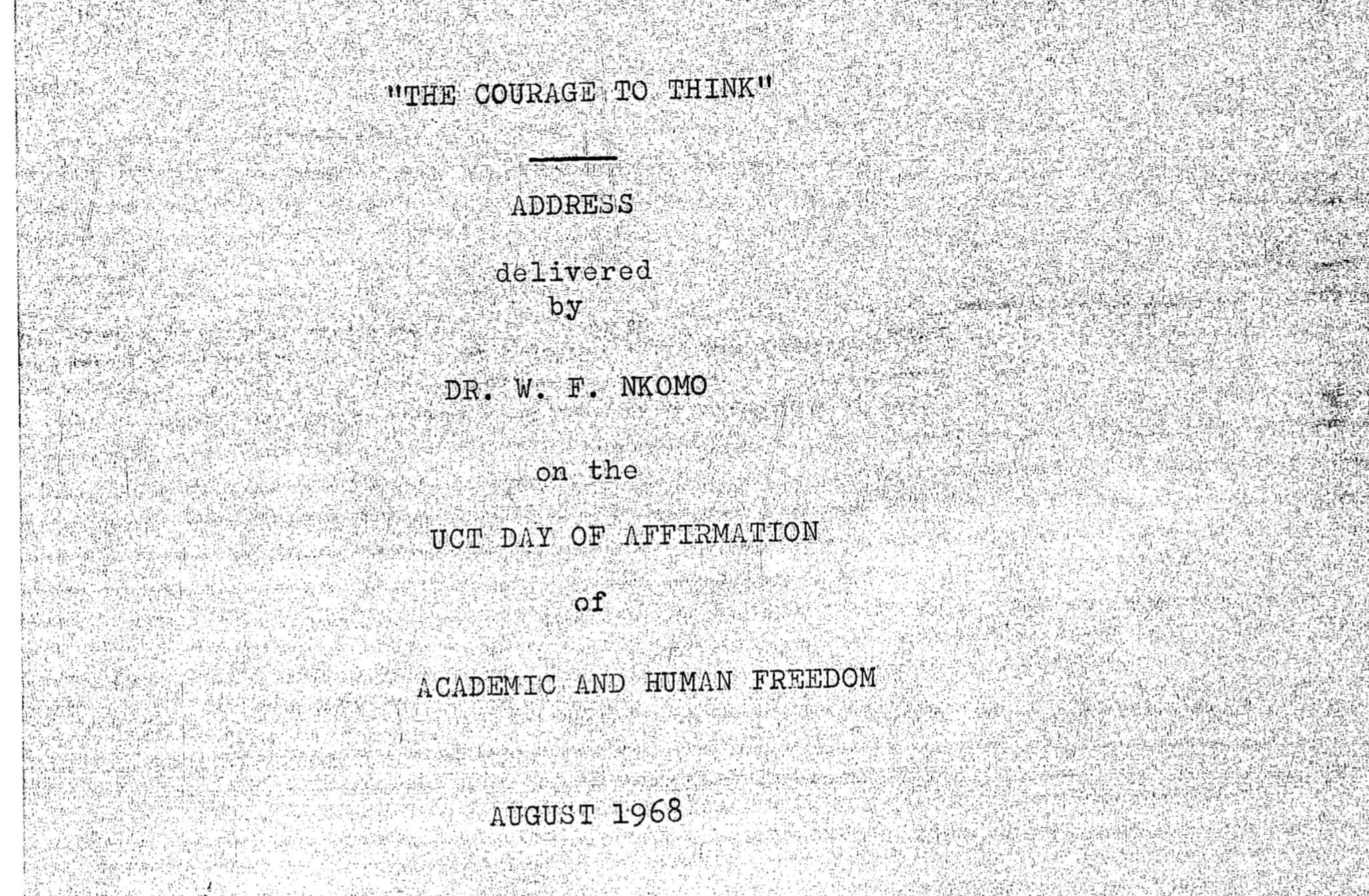
WF Nkomo delivered this speech at UCT in August 1968

14 August 1968, Nkomo was invited to speak at the University of Cape Town's Day of Affirmation of Academic and Human Freedom. His address, The Courage to Think followed in a series after that of Robert Kennedy's Ripple of Hope speech in June 1966. In his speech he said, "The idea of a common patriotism and nationalism was always recognised by all. It was only in recent times with the emergence of apartheid theoreticians that the country definitely deviated from the path of a common nationalism."

"Some of the youth are courageous enough to look at everything with a crucially critical mind, and there are those who follow the path of least resistance, that of merely accepting things from their forebears without questioning. If it does not appear to be the case in our country it has at any rate manifested itself in other parts of the world.A quick look at the recent events affecting the students in Berkeley, U.S.A.; in Columbia, U.S.A.; at the Sorbonne, Paris; in Rome; in Prague; and elsewhere will clearly indicate that the youth as represented by the students have become impatient with systems where they are merely on the receiving end; they are beginning to question things in a dynamic and revolutionary miner. They are coming to a realisation that the youth and the students especially constitute an important social factor in the promotion of social change.

"The revolt of youth must be accepted and what is needed is that instead of pooh-poohing it, the world should come to terms with it. After all, these very young people will be the leaders of tomorrow. History has shown clearly that reformers have nearly always been young men. The older folk have followed in the wake of their prophetic declarations and put these into the accepted traditions of the people".

== Community work and philanthropy ==
Nkomo mentored young people and adults and founded a secondary school in Marabastad. He granted scholarships to help students pursue medical degrees and other education. Nkomo's medical practice was known to not charge the old and poor.

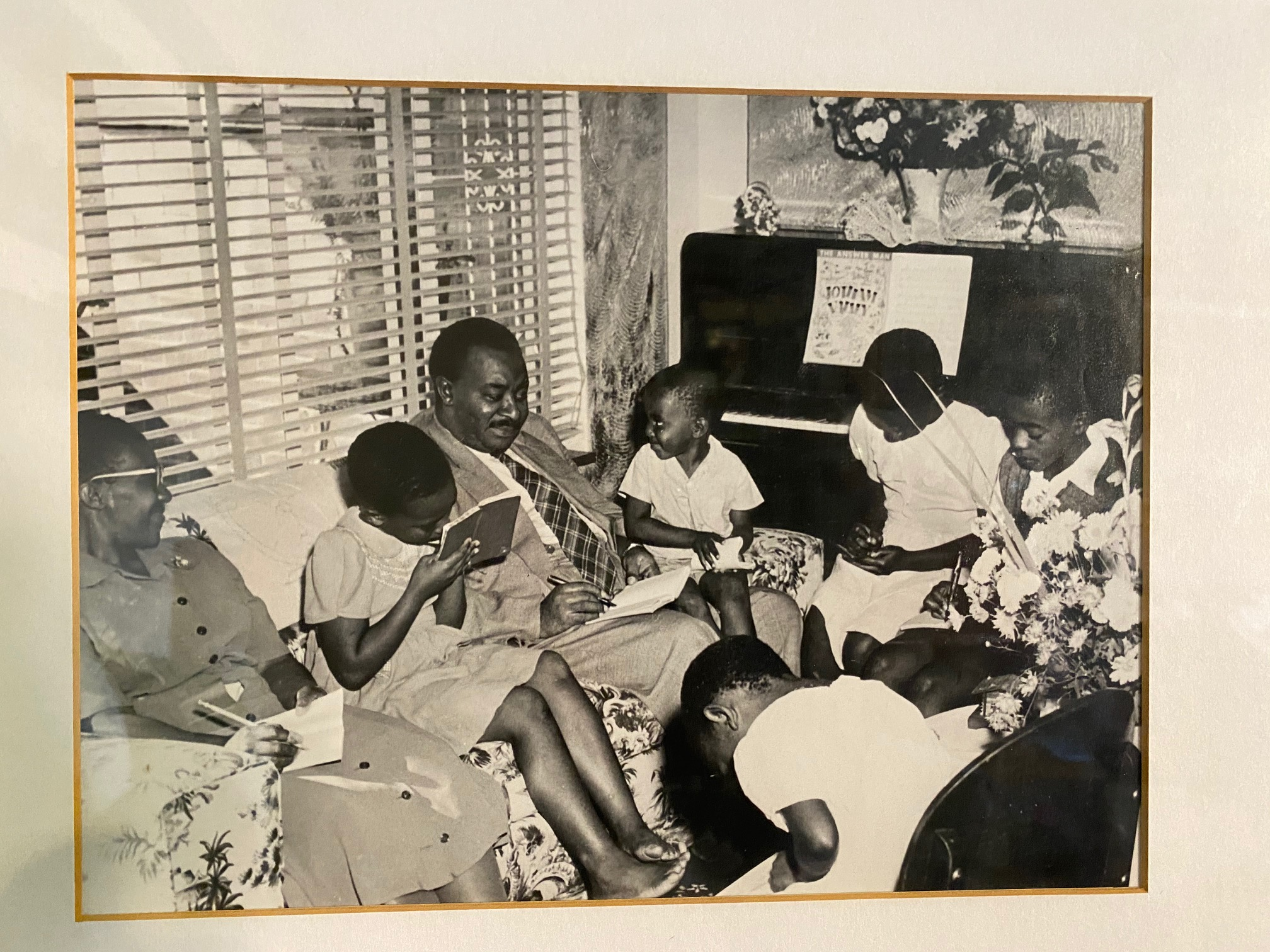
Reading time at the Nkomo home

Nkomo was trustee of the Bantu Welfare Trust and served on several boards in Atteridgeville and Lady Selborne. He was Honorary Doctor for Itireleng School for the Blind near Hammanskraal.

== Recognition ==
The community of Atteridgeville annually celebrates WF Nkomo Day in his honour. Today a secondary school in Atteridgeville is named after him as well as WF Nkomo Street, formerly Church Street, running from historic Church Square in Pretoria central to Atteridgeville (City of Tshwane). The new shopping centre, Nkomo Village in Atteridgeville was dedicated to his memory in 2018.

Nelson Mandela mentioned Nkomo in 1998, in a speech given at the installation of the University of the Witwatersrand's Vice-Chancellor and Principal, Colin Bundy. Mandela is quoted as saying the following: "This evening brings many memories from the past and many hopes for the future. I remember my own days as a student and I honour some of my fellows who studied, debated and agitated on this campus. Their names are legend: Joe Slovo, Ismael Meer, Harold Wolpe, J N Singh, William Nkomo and Ruth First. They count amongst those who set forth a message and an ethos in direct contrast to the fear, oppression and subservience which legislation of the time sought to impose and inculcate. They represent one of the proud strands in the tradition of Wits, a strand which the university will undoubtedly seek to build upon as it grapples with its role in the development of a new kind of South African society".

== Death ==
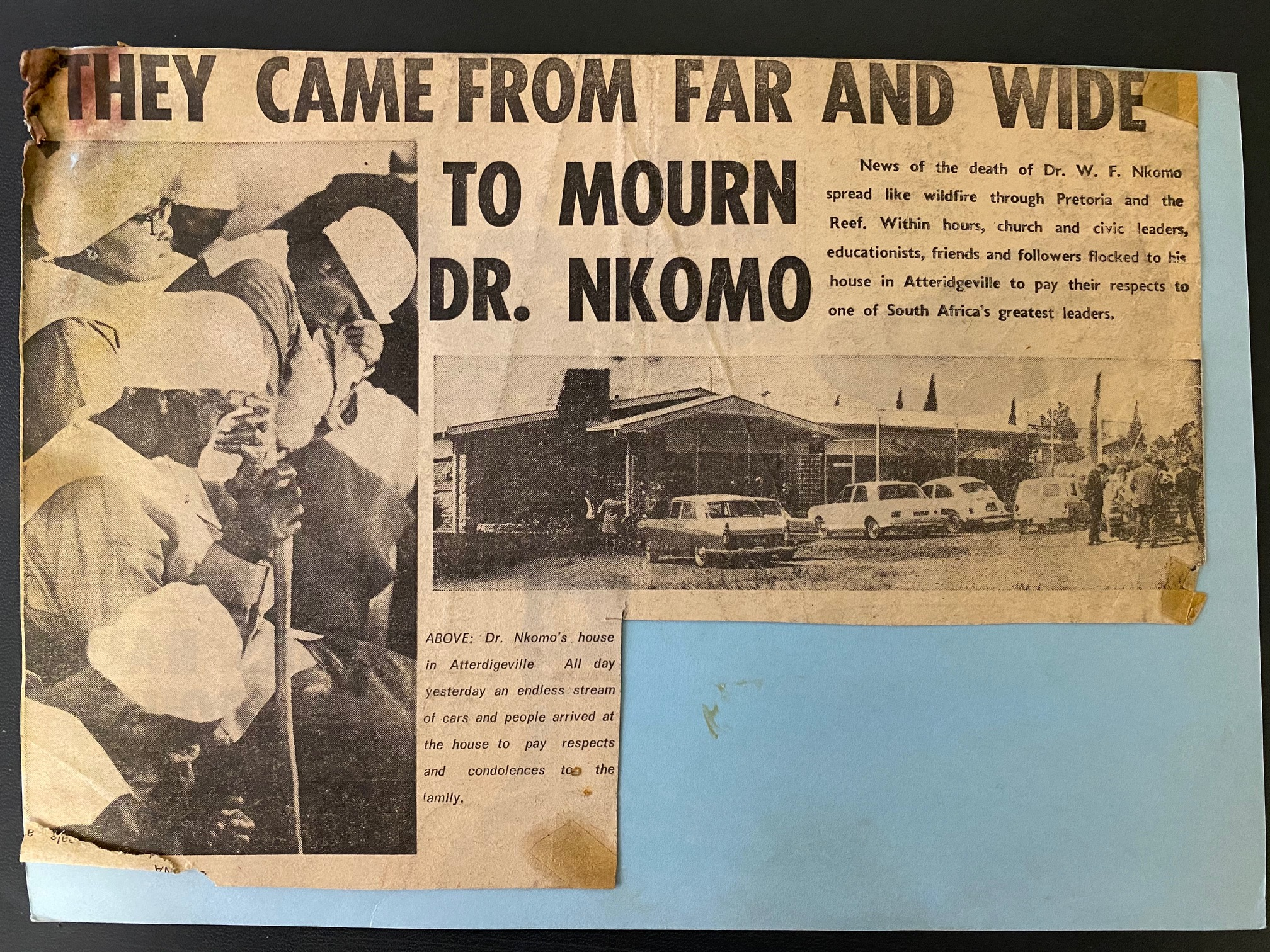
Newspaper clip - Dr Nkomo's death

Nkomo died in 1972, following cardiac arrest at HF Verwoerd Hospital, now Steve Biko Academic Hospital. He is buried alongside his wife, Susan who predeceased him at the Rebecca Street Cemetery in Pretoria.
