= Abe Nkomo =

South African politician and doctor (1940–2021)

His Excellency Abe Nkomo BA, MBChB

Personal details
- Born: Abraham Sokhaya Nkomo; 1 June 1940
- Died: 10 July 2021 (aged 81) Pretoria, South Africa
- Citizenship: South Africa
- Party: African National Congress
- Parent: William Frederick Nkomo
- Education: Nkamana High School, University of Fort Hare, University of Natal
- Nicknames: Abe; Abbey

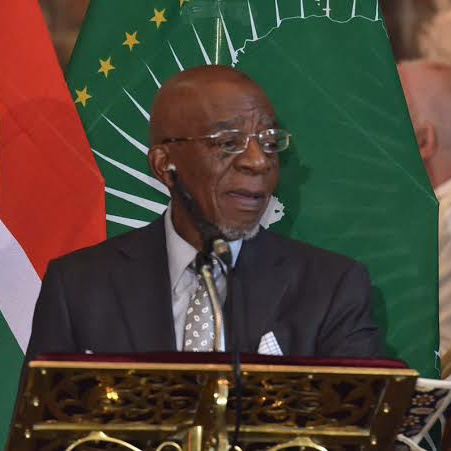
Nkomo at a government event

Abraham Sokhaya Nkomo (1 June 1940 – 10 July 2021) was a South African physician, an anti-apartheid activist, community leader, later a member of parliament, a diplomat and a longtime public health activist from Atteridgeville, Pretoria. He later represented the African National Congress (ANC) in the post-apartheid National Assembly, chairing the Portfolio Committee on Health during the first democratic Parliament.

== Early life and activism ==
Nkomo was born on 1 June 1940. He completed his education at Inkamana High School, the University of Fort Hare and the University of Natal. Like his father, William Nkomo, he became a medical doctor and community activist in Pretoria. In 1984, he helped found the Atteridgeville-Saulsville Residents Organisation (ASRO) and was elected its inaugural chairman. Allied to the outlawed ANC and strongly opposed to apartheid, ASRO's activism received international attention; during South Africa's 1986 state of emergency, the United States Senate passed a resolution, sponsored by Senator Mitch McConnell, acknowledging that Nkomo was "representative of the majority of South Africans who seek peaceful change in South Africa" and calling for the apartheid government to "enter into dialogue with such moderate forces".

ASRO led a campaign to protest and disable black local authorities in the area, most famously through a successful rent boycott that culminated, in 1990, with the government cutting off electricity supply to Atteridgeville in its entirety; in Operation Tshuma ("switch on"), ASRO organised young activists to move around the township with ladders to restore electricity supply from the power lines. By that time, Nkomo also chaired the Atteridgeville branch of the ANC, which had been unbanned in 1990.

Nkomo was a founding member of the Kagiso Trust in the 1980s and he succeeded Beyers Naude as its chairperson until 1994, when he joined Parliament. He was also a recipient of the Nelson Mandela Health Award.

== Post-apartheid political career ==
Nkomo was elected to the National Assembly in South Africa's first post-apartheid elections in 1994, and he was re-elected in 1999. He represented the Gauteng constituency and was chairperson of the Portfolio Committee on Health in a period which overlapped with the HIV/AIDS epidemic in South Africa. Zackie Achmat of the Treatment Action Campaign later admired Nkomo for his attitude and actions during the epidemic. Nkomo also chaired an ad hoc committee on abortion and sterilisation; his final report, completed in 1995, recommended open access to abortion during the first 14 weeks of pregnancy, which was granted by the Choice on Termination of Pregnancy Act the following year.

Nkomo left Parliament before the end of his second term to serve as South African High Commissioner to Malaysia. He was later High Commissioner to Canada.

== Personal life and death ==
Nkomo died of COVID-19-related illness on 10 July 2021 in hospital in Pretoria. His youngest son, Marumo Nkomo, is a trade diplomat.
