= Rebecca Street Cemetery =

Cemetery in Pretoria, South Africa

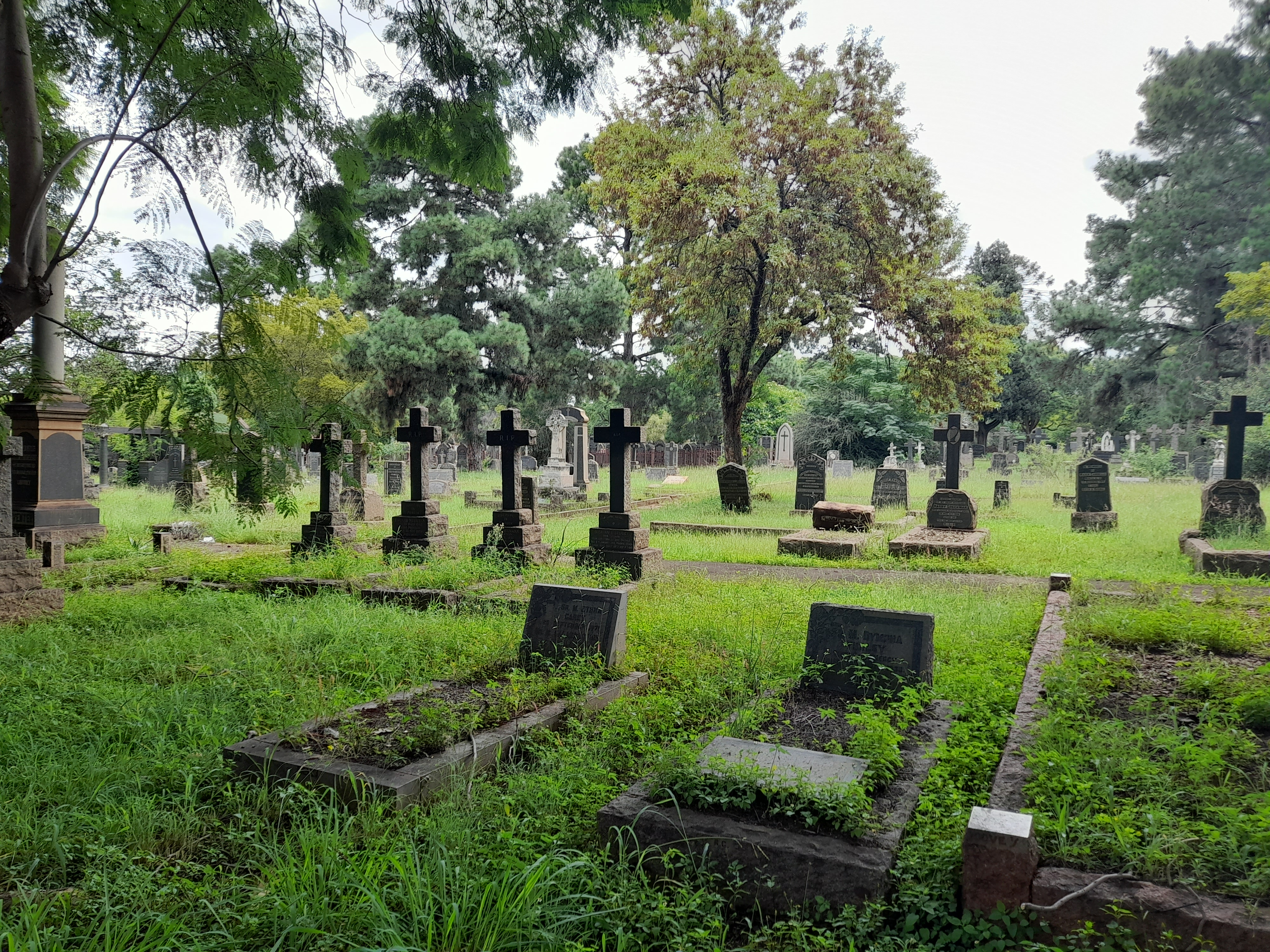
- The Roman Catholic Section of the Cemetery.

Details
- Established: 1904
- Country: South Africa
- Type: Public Cemetery
- Size: 0.55 km^{2} (0.21 sq mi)
- No. of graves: 2800+ graves
- Website: 071 495 4268 (Patricia)
- Find a Grave: Rebecca Street Cemetery

Rebecca Street Cemetery (also known as Pretoria West Cemetery) is a cemetery in Philip Nel Park on the northern end of Rebecca Street and in Staatsartillerie Street, in Pretoria West, South Africa. The cemetery offers views of the Union Buildings and the Voortrekker Monument. Although the Jewish and Muslim sections are well looked after, the rest of the cemetery is partially overgrown.

The cemetery was established in 1904. In 1987, 80 Nazi sympathizers gathered in the cemetery to honour Rudolf Hess, a German politician, convicted war criminal, and a leading member of the Nazi Party in Germany, who had recently died by suicide. In August 2016, the remains of 83 political prisoners were exhumed. In August 2020, the cemetery was described by The Pretoria Rekford, a community newspaper, as in a "terrible state." In 2021, local government began a clean-up effort.

== Notable burials ==
- Louis Botha, Prime Minister of South Africa
- Fanie Eloff, South African sculptor
- Jan Hendrik Hofmeyr (1894–1948), South African politician
- Joseph Petrus Jooste, South African politician and officer
- Sammy Marks, South African businessman
- Manie Maritz, South African general
- Vuyisile Mini (reinterred)
- William Frederick Nkomo

== Gallery ==
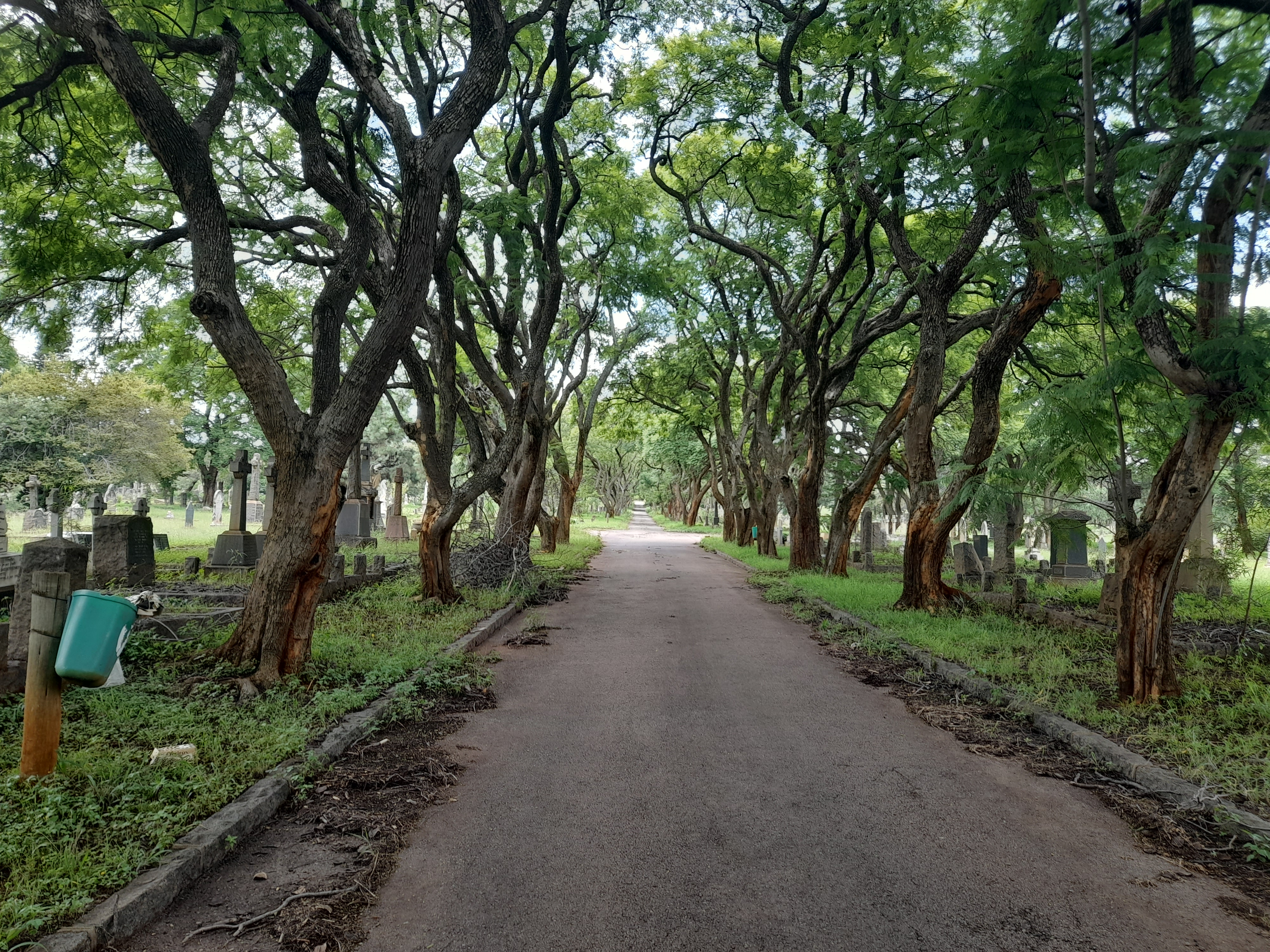
A road in the Roman Catholic section.

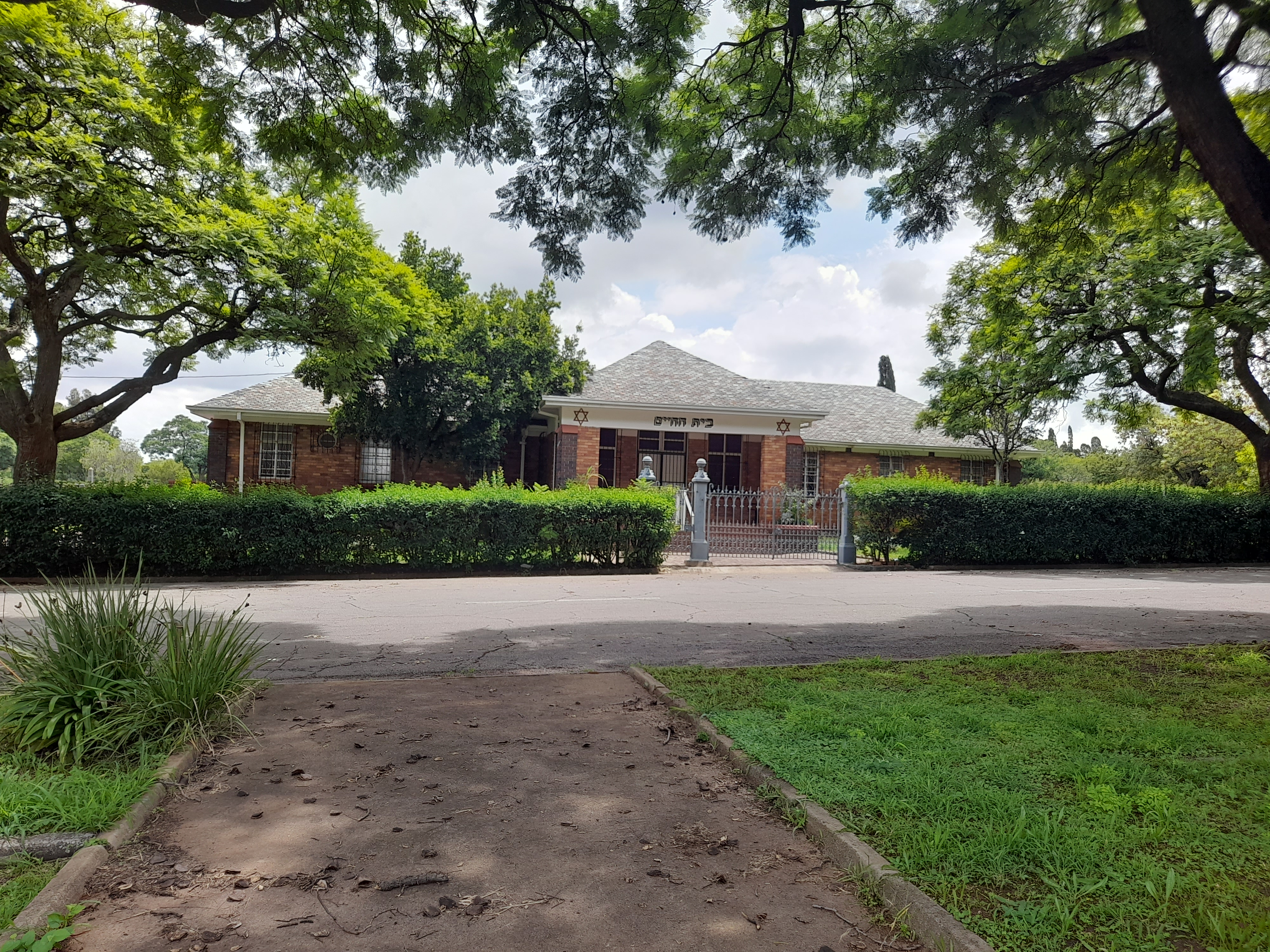
The Jewish Section, which is well looked after.

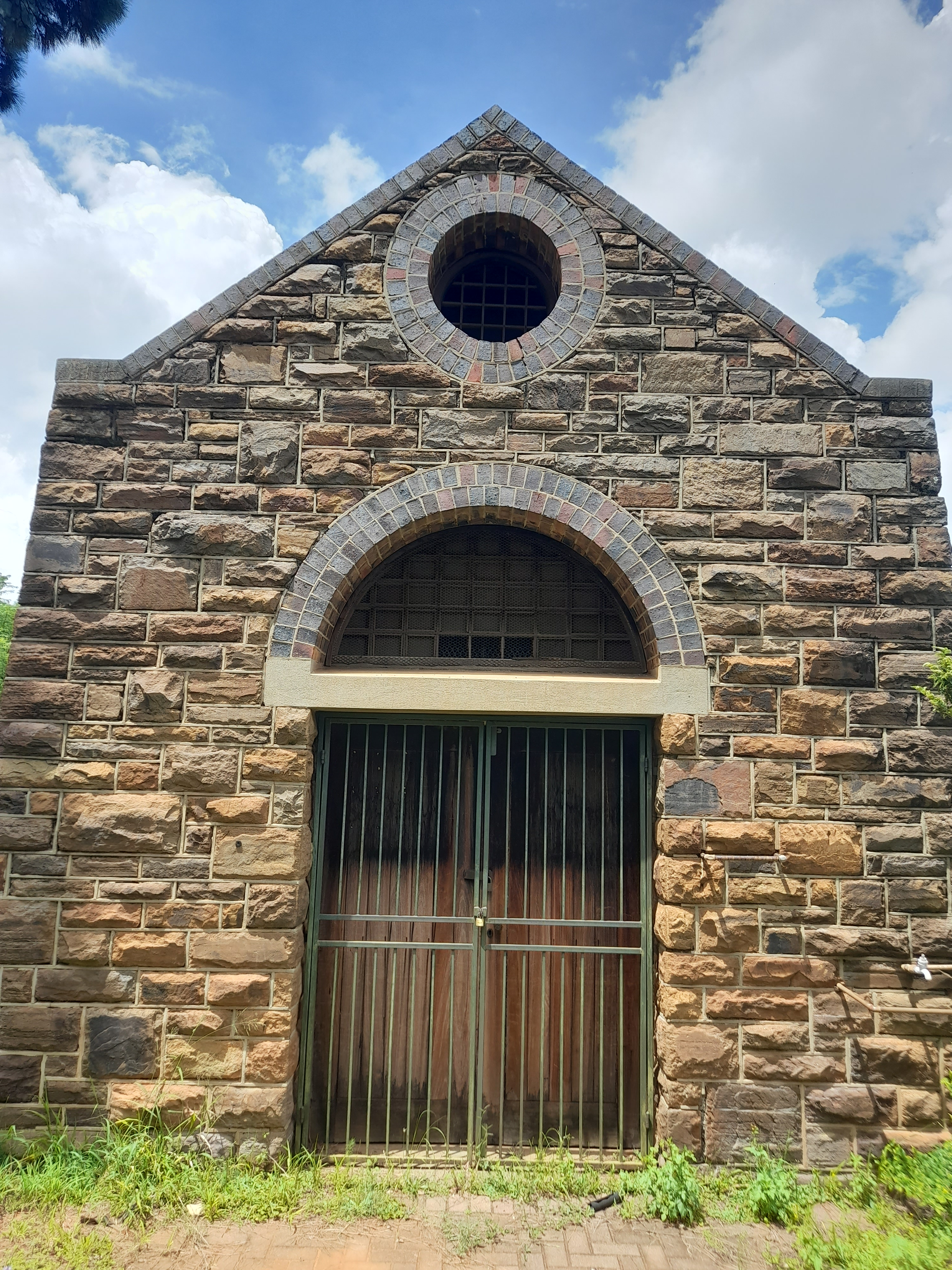
The only Chapel in the Cemetery near the Jewish Section.

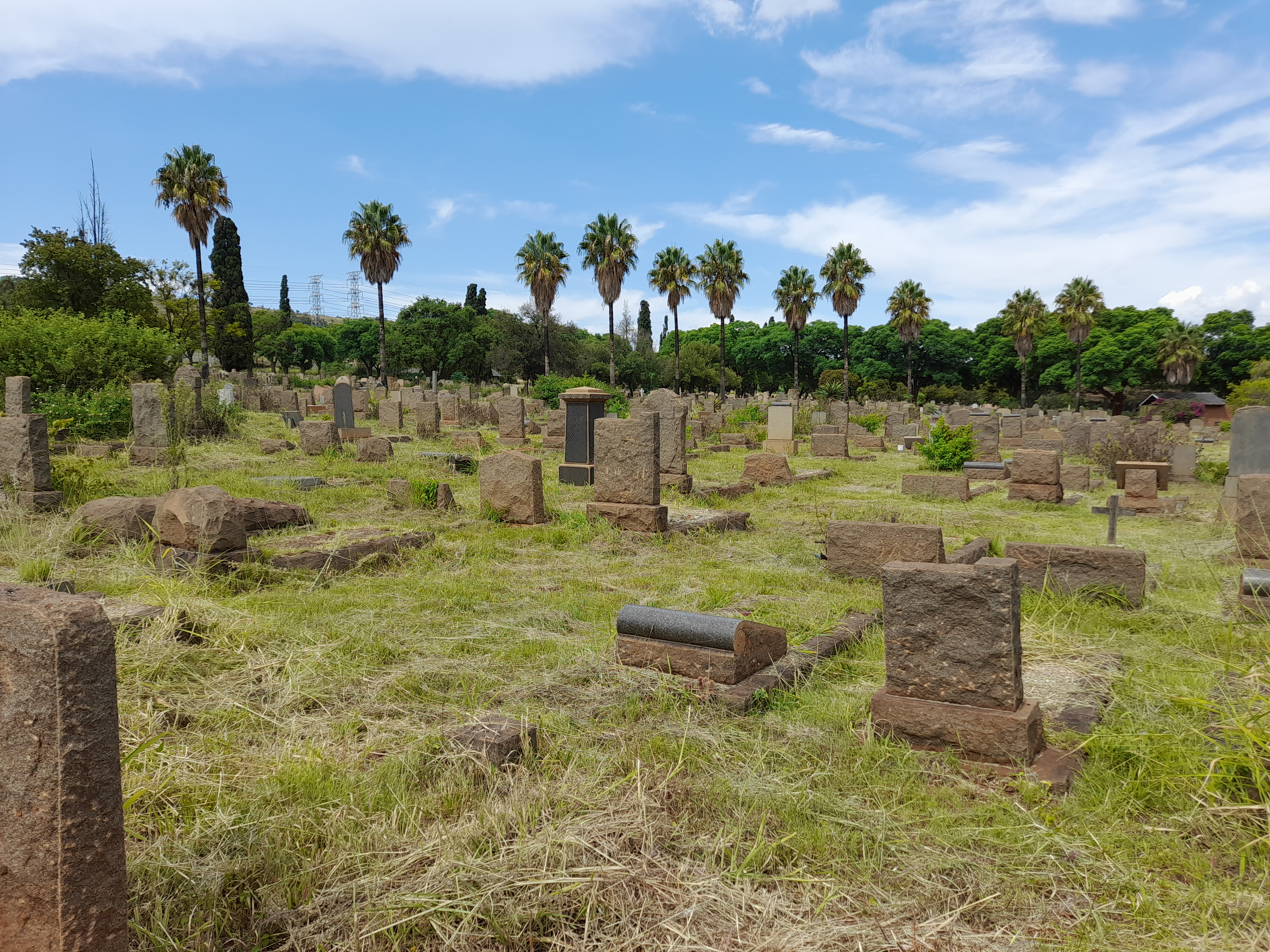
The Afrikaans part of the Cemetery.
