= Edward Philip Solomon =

South African lawyer and politician

The Honourable Sir Edward Philip Solomon KCMG
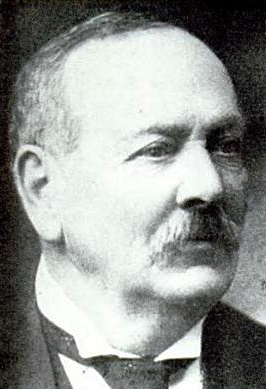

Senator for the Transvaal
- In office 15 November 1910 – 20 November 1914

Transvaal Minister of Public Works
- In office 4 March 1907 – 31 May 1910
- Prime Minister: Louis Botha
- Preceded by: New title
- Succeeded by: Office abolished

Member of the Transvaal Parliament for Fordsburg
- In office 20 February 1907 – 31 May 1910
- Preceded by: New district
- Succeeded by: Parliament abolished

Personal details
- Born: 1845
- Died: 20 November 1914 (age 69) Parktown, Johannesburg, South Africa

Sir Edward Phillip Solomon KCMG (1845 – 20 November 1914) was a successful lawyer and politician of the Transvaal Colony and the Union of South Africa.

== Early life ==
Edward Solomon was born in 1845, studied to be an attorney, and based himself in Johannesburg. He was involved in politics from early on, strongly identifying with the cause of the "Uitlanders" (English resident in the Boer republics). He even became a prominent member of the Reform Committee which sponsored the Jameson Raid in 1895, which led to his brief imprisonment in Pretoria.

Solomon was a member of a large and influential Cape family, of St Helenan Jewish descent. Members of the Solomon family were heavily involved in Southern African politics: Cape Colony politician Saul Solomon was his uncle, and his brothers were the Attorney General Sir Richard Solomon and future Chief Justice Sir William Henry Solomon. His sister, Emilie J. Solomon, was a chair of the Congregational Union of South Africa.

== Political career ==
He became the first Chairman of the Transvaal Colony Responsible Government Association, and in 1906 was elected as the President of the Transvaal National Association, a political party based on South African Union, equity of the races, and opposing Chinese mine labourers.

With Transvaal having been granted responsible self-government by letters patent on 6 December 1906, in early 1907 Solomon was elected to the Transvaal Legislative Assembly at its first election on 20 February 1907 for the seat of Fordsburg. With his brother Richard successfully negotiating with the Het Volk Party led by Louis Botha and Jan Smuts, to have a coalition cabinet despite the Het Volk majority in the Legislative Assembly, Solomon was subsequently appointed to the first Transvaal Cabinet by Prime Minister Louis Botha as Minister of Public Works.

Following the creation of the Union of South Africa, on 15 November 1910 Solomon was elected to the Senate of South Africa. Having been granted the use of the title "The Honourable" for life, in the 1911 New Year Honours, Solomon was made a Knight Commander of the Order of St Michael and St George (KCMG). Solomon died age 69 at his residence in Parktown, Johannesburg on 20 November 1914.

Assembly seats
New seat	Member of Parliament for Fordsburg; 1907–1910	Transvaal merged into South Africa
Political offices
New title	Minister of Public Works; 1907–1910	Transvaal merged into South Africa
Party political offices
New title	President of the Transvaal National Association; 1906–1910	Merged into South African Party
