= Transvaal Colony =

British colony from 1877 to 1881 and 1902 to 1910

Coordinates: 25°S 30°E

Transvaal Colony Transvaalkolonie
- 1877–1881, 1902–1910
- Flag Badge
- Royal anthem: "God Save the Queen" (1877–1881) "God Save the King" (1902–1910)
- Location of Transvaal, circa 1890
- Status: Crown colony of the United Kingdom
- Capital: Pretoria
- Official language: English
- Common languages: Afrikaans, Dutch, Ndebele, Sepedi, Tsonga, Tswana, Venda, Zulu
- Ethnic groups (1904): 73.79% Black; 23.40% White; 1.90% Coloured; 0.89% Asian
- Religion: Dutch Reformed; Anglican
- Government: Constitutional monarchy
- Monarch
  - 1877–1901: Victoria
  - 1901–1910: Edward VII
  - 1910: George V
- Governor
  - 1902–1905: Viscount Milner
  - 1905–1910: Earl of Selborne
- Prime Minister
  - 1907–1910: Louis Botha
- Legislature: Parliament of the Transvaal
  - Upper house: Legislative Council
  - Lower house: Legislative Assembly
- Historical era: Scramble for Africa
  - Established: 12 April 1877
  - Pretoria Convention: 3 August 1881
  - 'Transvaal Colony' Proclaimed: 1 September 1900
  - Treaty of Vereeniging: 31 May 1902
  - Grant of responsible self-government: 6 December 1906
  - Union of South Africa: 31 May 1910

Population
  - 1904: 1,268,716
Preceded by	Succeeded by
South African Republic	Union of South Africa; Swaziland Protectorate
- Today part of: South Africa; Eswatini

The Transvaal Colony (Afrikaans pronunciation: [transˈfɑːl]) was the name used to refer to the Transvaal region during the period of direct British rule and military occupation between the end of the Second Boer War in 1902, when the South African Republic was dissolved, and the establishment of the Union of South Africa in 1910. The borders of the Transvaal Colony were larger than the defeated South African Republic (which had existed from 1852 to 1902). In 1910 the entire territory became the Transvaal Province of the Union of South Africa.

== History ==
Both the Boer republics, the South African Republic (ZAR) and the Orange Free State were defeated in the Anglo-Boer War and surrendered to the UK. The peace treaty (Treaty of Vereeniging) contained the following terms:

1. That all burghers of the ZAR and Orange Free State lay down their arms and accept King Edward VII as their sovereign.
2. That all burghers outside the borders of the ZAR and Orange Free State, upon declaring their allegiance to the King, be transported back to their homes.
3. That all burghers so surrendering will not be deprived of their property.
4. No Civil or Criminal proceedings against burghers for acts of war, except Acts contrary to the usage of war. In such cases, there is to be held an immediate court-martial.
5. That High Dutch be taught in schools and that the use of the Dutch language will be allowed in law courts.
6. That the possession of rifles be allowed under licence.
7. That Military Administration be succeeded at the earliest possible date by representative institutions leading up to self-government.
8. That the question of granting franchise to natives not be discussed until after self-government.
9. That no special tax be introduced to cover the costs of the war.
10. That various commissions be established to process and pay valid claims for war expenses and to honor script issued by the countries of the ZAR and Orange Free State during the period of the war. The commission would also feed the homeless and assist with the reconstruction of homes affected by the war. To that end, the crown agrees to a free grant of £3,000,000 as well as loans at no interest for two years to be repaid at 3 percent interest over years thereafter.

In 1902, with peace following the signing of the Treaty of Vereeniging, the new Transvaal colony was faced with intertwined economic and political issues that needed to be resolved. The economic issues faced included the restoration of the mining industry to pre-war levels, then growing it further with the need for extra labour, the restoration of the Boers to their lands and increasing the agricultural output of those farms. The political issue faced depended on what side of politics one stood on. The existing British administrators under Alfred Milner wished to anglicise the population through two main means. One by increasing the English-speaking population of the Transvaal and the other by teaching the Boer children in English with very little Dutch used, followed by self-rule. The Transvaal Boers' political objectives were the restoration of self-rule in the colony and the political environment to be dominated by the Boers.

== Repatriation and reconstruction ==
As the war ended the British were faced with a large proportion of Boer men as prisoners of war and their families in concentration camps. As the British followed a scorched earth policy in the Transvaal, Boer lands, stock and farms had been destroyed.

At the conclusion of the war, it was necessary to reconstruct a "government" for the new colony, and this was begun with the appointment of a resident magistrate in every district of the colony who became district commissioners while an assistant magistrate carried out the legal and magisterial duties of the area. Roman-Dutch law was translated into English so the law courts could continue, with some old acts repealed and a considerable amount of new law promulgated by the authorities in Johannesburg.

The resident magistrate then submitted the names of three members of the district to the governor for district commission under the magistrate. They would consist of one British subject, and two Boers, one from those who had surrendered early on in the war and one who had fought until the end. The commission would have two functions, one to provide assistance and issuing of rations, equipment, transport and plough animals to those affected by the war, and the second to investigate claims for compensation for actual damages sustained during the war.

Repatriation depots were established in the districts and they were stocked with food, seed, agricultural equipment, transport, plough animals, stone and building material. The rail transport network struggled to compete with the army transport requirement to maintain a garrison and civilian requirements to repair the colony. All feed for transport animals had to be brought to the depots as the process started in the winter of 1902. Refugees from the concentration camps and prisoners of war were returned to their districts in a system of drafts. At the depots, they would receive farm equipment, tents and rations to start again and transport to their destinations. Food rations were provided for almost a year. Families would receive a token grant irrespective of their ability to pay it back and additional material and equipment required were obtained via interest-free loans with small cash loans also attracting no interest, with larger loans attracting four percent interest by a mortgage. The loan scheme was never going to compensate a person for the actual loss experienced by the war. Damage and the reconstruction required varied from district to district.

In the larger towns, municipal or health boards were "appointed" to manage them under the resident magistrate. They had limited functions and the only rates they levied were for sanitary functions. Within fifteen months of the end of the war, the municipal government was introduced with preparations made for fair elections based on property valuation and the creation of voters' rolls with the registration process explained in English and Dutch.

=== Economic issues ===
The British administrators set out to place most Boer farmers back on their land by March 1903 with nineteen million pounds spent on war damages, grants and loans. The administrators reformed the state agricultural departments to modernise farming in the colony which resulted in a maize and beef surplus by 1908. They also attempted to solve the poor white problem by settling them as tenant farmers on state land, but the lack of capital and labour caused the scheme to fail. An attempt was made to place English settlers on farmland so as to anglicise the Transvaal and increase the English-speaking population but this failed, too, as the policy attracted too few settlers.

By the end of 1901, gold mining finally resumed on the Witwatersrand around Johannesburg, having virtually stopped since 1899. Backed by the mining magnates and the British administrators, there was a need to restart the industry but labour was required. Just prior to the war, white miners wages were high and magnates weren't keen to increase wages, since black miners wages had been reduced before the war and not increased, so black labourers weren't interested in working the mines. Unskilled white labour was ruled out as their wages would be too high for the work done, so the mining magnates and their Chamber of Mines in 1903 sought alternative labour in the form of cheap Chinese workers. The legislation to import Chinese labour was introduced at the Transvaal Legislative Council on 28 December 1903 by George Farrar and was debated for 30 hours and successfully voted on after its three readings on 30 December 1903, coming into law in February 1904. Having been rubber-stamped by the British and mining appointed Transvaal Legislative Council it outlined extremely restrictive employment contracts for the Chinese workers, the idea had been sold via a fear campaign aimed at white miners on the need for this labour or face the possibility of lost mining jobs. By 1906, the gold mines of the Witwatersrand were in full production and by 1907, South African gold mines represented thirty-two percent of the worlds gold output. By 1910, Chinese labour ended on the Witwatersrand and the restrictive job reservation laws preventing Chinese miners doing certain jobs was replicated for Black miners.

=== Political issues ===
From the end of the war in 1902, the political administration of the Transvaal colony was controlled by members of a legislative and executive council, all appointed by the British Administrators under Alfred Milner and the Colonial Secretary in London. In 1903, three seats in the Transvaal Legislative council were offered to Louis Botha, Jan Smuts and Koos de la Rey, but they turned the British down. Due to a lack of a hearing given to the opinions of the Boer generals by the English administrators concerning Chinese mine labour, due to a belief that they did not represent the Boer population, and due to the lack of self-rule, Louis Botha and others met in 1904 at a Volkskongres. The result of this people congress was the unification of the Boer political movement in the Transvaal into a new party called Het Volk in January 1905 by Louis Botha and Jan Smuts. This new party's objective was to seek reconciliation with Britain, which would be favoured by the British opposition Liberal Party, and Boer self-rule for the Transvaal.

English political movements included the Transvaal Responsible Government Association, the Transvaal Progressive Association and labour groups under an Industrial Labour Party. The Transvaal Responsible Government Association was formed in late 1904 by E.P Solomon and made up of a loose gathering of ex-colonial and ZAR officials and diamond mining magnates, labour and businessmen. They called for the allowance of the colony to create its own policy and strive for self-government and for the party to be eventually renamed the Nationalists. The Transvaal Progressive Association, formed in November 1904 and active from February 1905, had a similar membership but was linked to the mining industry's opposed self-rule and preferred a legislature nominated by the High Commissioner with strong links to Britain. They were led by George Farrar and Percy Fitzpatrick.

The pro-Boer Liberal Party in Britain came to power in January 1906 with a new policy for the two former Boer colonies, one of self-rule. Jan Smuts visited London and managed to persuade the new government to formulate a system that would favour the Boers and Het Volk in a new political assembly. More than a year later in February 1907 an election was held with Het Volk running on two issues; Chinese labour needing to be ended when new labour sources were found and reconciliation with Britain with which they hoped would attract the English labourer vote as well as selling themselves as an alternative to the mining capitalistic Progressive Party.

== 1907 election ==
1907 election results.

The election was held on 20 February 1907 and Het Volk won the election gathering 37 of 69 seats. It stood 43 candidates and won 34 seats outright, all the country seats were gained except Barberton, three seats in Pretoria and four on the Witwatersrand with three independents aligning themselves with the party. The Progressive Party stood 34 candidates and won 21 seats, twenty on the Witwatersrand and one in Pretoria with five Randlords winning seats. Other parties included the Nationalists (old Transvaal Responsible Government Association) that won 6 seats, four on the Witwatersrand and two in Pretoria but their leader Richard Solomon failed to win his seat. The Transvaal Independent Labour Party won three seats in the Witwatersrand after contesting 14, but their leader Frederic Creswell failed to gain a seat.

Louis Botha became Prime Minister of the Transvaal and Agriculture minister with Jan Smuts as its colonial secretary. Other new cabinet ministers included J de Villiers, Attorney-General and Mines, Henry Charles Hull, Treasurer, Johann Rissik, Land and Native Affairs, Harry Solomon held Public Works and Edward Rooth as whip. The Progressives in opposition would be led by George Farrar and Abe Bailey as the opposition whip. They all assembled for the first time in March 1907. After the 1907 election, the issue of Chinese mining labour was revisited with Het Volk believing there was enough labour in the form of black and white miners. Taking into account the economic interests of the Transvaal, Botha ensured a gradual policy of repatriation of Chinese labour.

By 1908, the Boers had won control, in elections, of the Natal, Orange River and Transvaal colonies, but under British influence there was the need now to unite the country under one government.

== Progression to Union ==
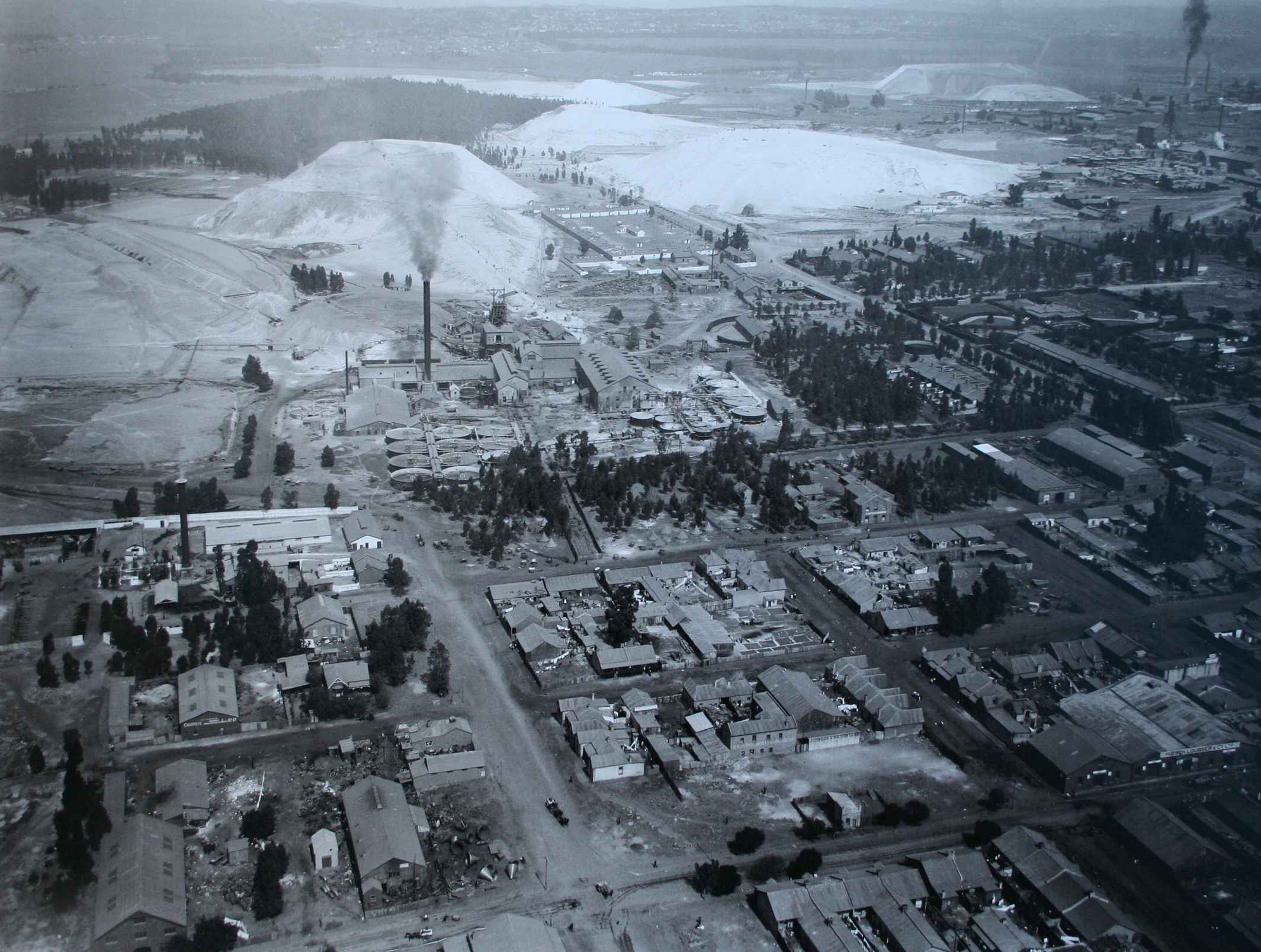
Aerial photography of gold mines, taken by Eduard Spelterini in July 1911

In May 1908, Jan Smuts, Transvaal Colonial Secretary proposed a gathering of representatives from all four colonies and decide on a customs and railways agreement and also included a proposal that the colonies appoint delegates to discuss a constitution for a united country in the form of a National Convention. The objective of the convention was to find a solution to the political, racial and economic problems encountered by these colonies and find common ground between the Boers and the English. On 12 October 1908, the thirty delegates of the four colonies met in Durban under the Chairmanship of Sir Henry de Villiers. Twelve delegates came from the Cape Colony, eight from the Transvaal and five each from the Orange River and Natal Colonies representing a gathering of sixteen from an English background with the remaining fourteen of Boer origin.

The main issues discussed were whether the four colonies would become a country made up of a union or a federation, who would be allowed to vote, and the number of voters who would make up a constituency in rural and urban seats. All three objectives were eventually finalised with South Africa to become a union which was the wish of both the Liberal British government and Jan Smuts. On the question of black enfranchisement, the British government was prepared to accept the final wishes of the National Convention. The colonies of the Transvaal, Orange River and Natal wanted no black enfranchisement while the Cape Colony wished to keep what limited enfranchisement it had for all other races. A compromise was reached and all the colonies' wishes concerning their racial make-up for enfranchisement were accepted, though subject to a repeal by a two-thirds majority in both houses of parliament. As to the objective of rural and urban constituencies, it was decided to allow fifteen percent fewer constituents for a rural seat while an urban seat would have fifteen percent more constituents. This system for the constituencies would ensure that the Afrikaner would dominate politics in years to come and would be one of the many reasons why Jan Smuts would lose the 1948 South African general election, sweeping D.F. Malan to power and the beginning of Apartheid. The results of the negotiations at the convention became the draft South Africa Act which was released for viewing on 9 February 1909. By 19 August 1909, the South Africa Act passed through the British Parliament and into law.

As to the question of black enfranchisement, Milner saw this is a serious issue when it came to a peace treaty:

"If I did not have some conscience about the treatment of blacks I personally could win over the Dutch in the Colony and indeed all the South African dominion without offending the English. You have only to sacrifice ‘the nigger’ and the game is easy. Any attempt to secure fair play for them makes the Dutch fractious and almost unmanageable."

== Colonial Administration ==
Prior to the grant of responsible self-government on 6 December 1906, the colony was administered by an Executive Council appointed by the governor. The first elected Cabinet of the Transvaal Colony was formed on 4 March 1907.

=== Attorney General ===
Attorney General	Tenure	Notes
Sir Richard Solomon	22 March 1901 – 23 March 1906	
Herbert Francis Blaine	23 March 1906 – 4 March 1907	
Jacob de Villiers	4 March 1907 – 31 May 1910	

=== Colonial Secretary ===
Colonial Secretary	Tenure	Notes
George Fiddes (Secretary to the Administration)	22 March 1901 – 21 June 1902	
Walter Edward Davidson	21 June 1902 – 1903	
Patrick Duncan	1903 – 4 March 1907	
Jan Smuts	4 March 1907 – 31 May 1910	

=== Native Affairs ===
Name	Tenure	Notes
Sir Godfrey Lagden (Commissioner of Native Affairs)	22 March 1901 – 4 March 1907	
Johann Rissik (Minister of Native Affairs)	4 March 1907 – 31 May 1910	

=== Colonial Treasurer ===
Name	Tenure	Notes
Patrick Duncan	22 March 1901 – 1903	
William Lionel Hichens	1903 – 4 March 1907	
Henry Charles Hull	4 March 1907 – 31 May 1910	

=== Lands ===
Name	Tenure	Notes
Adam Jameson (Commissioner of Lands)	21 June 1902 – 4 March 1907	
Johann Rissik (Minister of Lands)	4 March 1907 – 31 May 1910	

=== Mines ===
Name	Tenure	Notes
Wilfred John Wybergh (Commissioner of Mines)	22 March 1901 – 2 December 1903	
Horace Weldon (Acting Commissioner of Mines)	2 December 1903 – 4 March 1907	
Jacob de Villiers (Minister of Mines)	4 March 1907 – 31 May 1910	

== Geography ==
The Transvaal Colony lay between Vaal River in the south and the Limpopo River in the north, roughly between 22½ and 27½ S, and 25 and 32 E. To its south it bordered with the Orange Free State and Natal Colony, to its south-west were the Cape Colony, to the west was the Bechuanaland Protectorate (later Botswana), to its north was Rhodesia, and to its east were Portuguese East Africa and Swaziland. Except in the south-west, these borders were mostly well defined by natural features. Within the Transvaal lies the Waterberg Massif, a prominent ancient geological feature of the South African landscape.

Divisions:

- Zoutpansberg

Cities in the Transvaal Colony:

- Heidelberg
- Johannesburg
- Messina
- Nelspruit
- Pietersburg
- Pretoria
- Vereeniging

== Demographics ==
=== 1904 Census ===
Population statistics from the 1904 Census.

Population group	Number	Percent (%)
Black	937,127	73.79
White	297,277	23.40
Coloured	24,226	1.90
Asian	11,321	0.89
Total	1,269,951	99.98

== See also ==
- History of South Africa
