= Louis Botha =

1st prime minister of South Africa from 1910 to 1919

General The Right Honourable Louis Botha
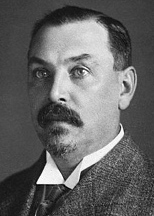
- Botha in the 1910s

1st Prime Minister of South Africa
- In office 31 May 1910 – 27 August 1919
- Monarch: George V
- Governors-General: The Viscount Gladstone; The Viscount Buxton
- Preceded by: Position established
- Succeeded by: Jan Smuts

Prime Minister of the Transvaal
- In office 4 March 1907 – 31 May 1910
- Monarchs: Edward VII; George V
- Governor: The Earl of Selborne
- Preceded by: Position established
- Succeeded by: Himself (as Prime Minister of South Africa)

Personal details
- Born: 27 September 1862 Greytown, Colony of Natal
- Died: 27 August 1919 (aged 56) Pretoria, Transvaal, Union of South Africa
- Resting place: Rebecca Street Cemetery, Pretoria, South Africa
- Party: South African Party
- Other political affiliations: Het Volk Party
- Spouse: Annie Emmett (m. 1886)
- Profession: Career military officer, politician
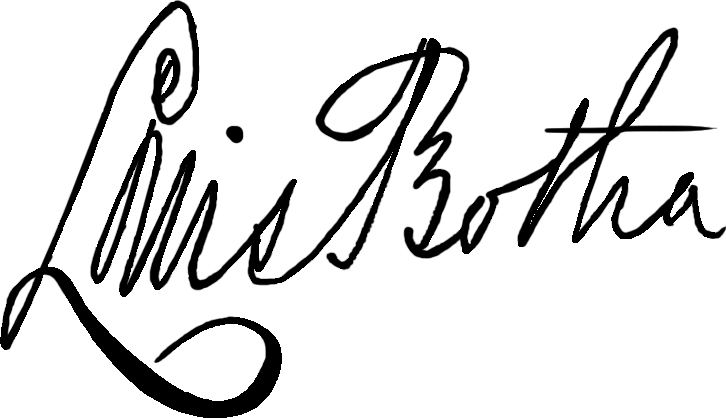
- Signature

Military service
- Allegiance: South African Republic; Union of South Africa; British Commonwealth
- Years of service: 1899–1902 (Transvaal Commandos); 1902–1919 (British Imperial Armies)
- Rank: General
- Commands: Boer, South African Republic
- Battles/wars: Second Boer War; Battle of Colenso; Battle of Spion Kop; Battle of Vaal Krantz; World War I; South-West Africa Campaign; Maritz rebellion

Louis Botha (locally /ˈbʊərtə/ BOOR-tə, Afrikaans pronunciation: [ˈlu.i ˈbuəta]; 27 September 1862 – 27 August 1919) was a South African politician who was the first prime minister of the Union of South Africa, the forerunner of the modern South African state. A Boer war veteran during the Second Boer War, Botha eventually fought to have South Africa become a British Dominion.

== Zulu conflict ==
Louis Botha led "Dinuzulu's Volunteers", a group of Boers that had supported Dinuzulu against Zibhebhu in 1884.

== Politician ==
Botha later became a member of the parliament of Transvaal in 1897, representing the district of Vryheid.

== Second Boer War ==
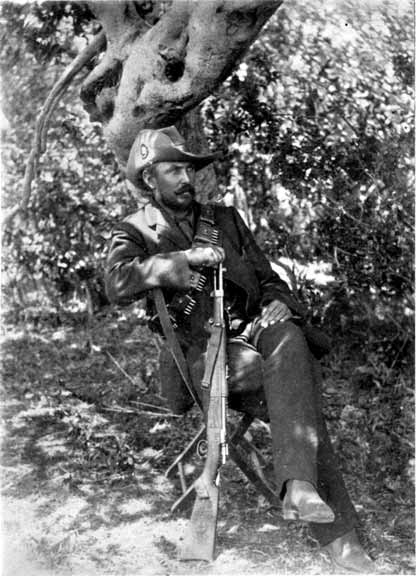
Botha during the Boer War

=== Early battles ===
In 1899, Louis Botha fought in the Second Boer War, initially joining the Krugersdorp Commando, continuing to fight under Lucas Meyer in Northern Natal, and later as a general commanding and leading Boer forces impressively at Colenso and Spion Kop. On the death of P. J. Joubert, he was made commander-in-chief of the Transvaal Boers, where he demonstrated his abilities again at Belfast-Dalmanutha. After one of the battles at the Tugela River, Botha granted a twenty-four-hour armistice to General Buller to enable him to bury his dead.

=== Capture of Winston Churchill ===
Winston Churchill revealed in his memoirs that General Botha was the Boer soldier who took him prisoner at gunpoint at the Battle of Chieveley on 15 November 1899. Churchill was not aware of the man's identity until 1902, when Botha travelled to London seeking loans to assist his country's reconstruction, and the two met at a private luncheon. The incident is also mentioned in Arthur Conan Doyle's book, The Great Boer War, published in 1902. Historian Owen Coetzer confirmed this story in 1996. However, more recent research indicates that Field cornet Sarel Oosthuizen captured Churchill. Another account claims that Churchill was captured by the Italian Volunteer Legion, commanded by Camillo Ricchiardi.

=== Later campaigns ===
After the fall of Pretoria in June 1900, Louis Botha led a concentrated guerrilla campaign against the British together with Koos de la Rey and Christiaan de Wet. The success of his measures was seen in the steady resistance offered by the Boers to the very close of the three-year war.

== Role after the Boer War ==
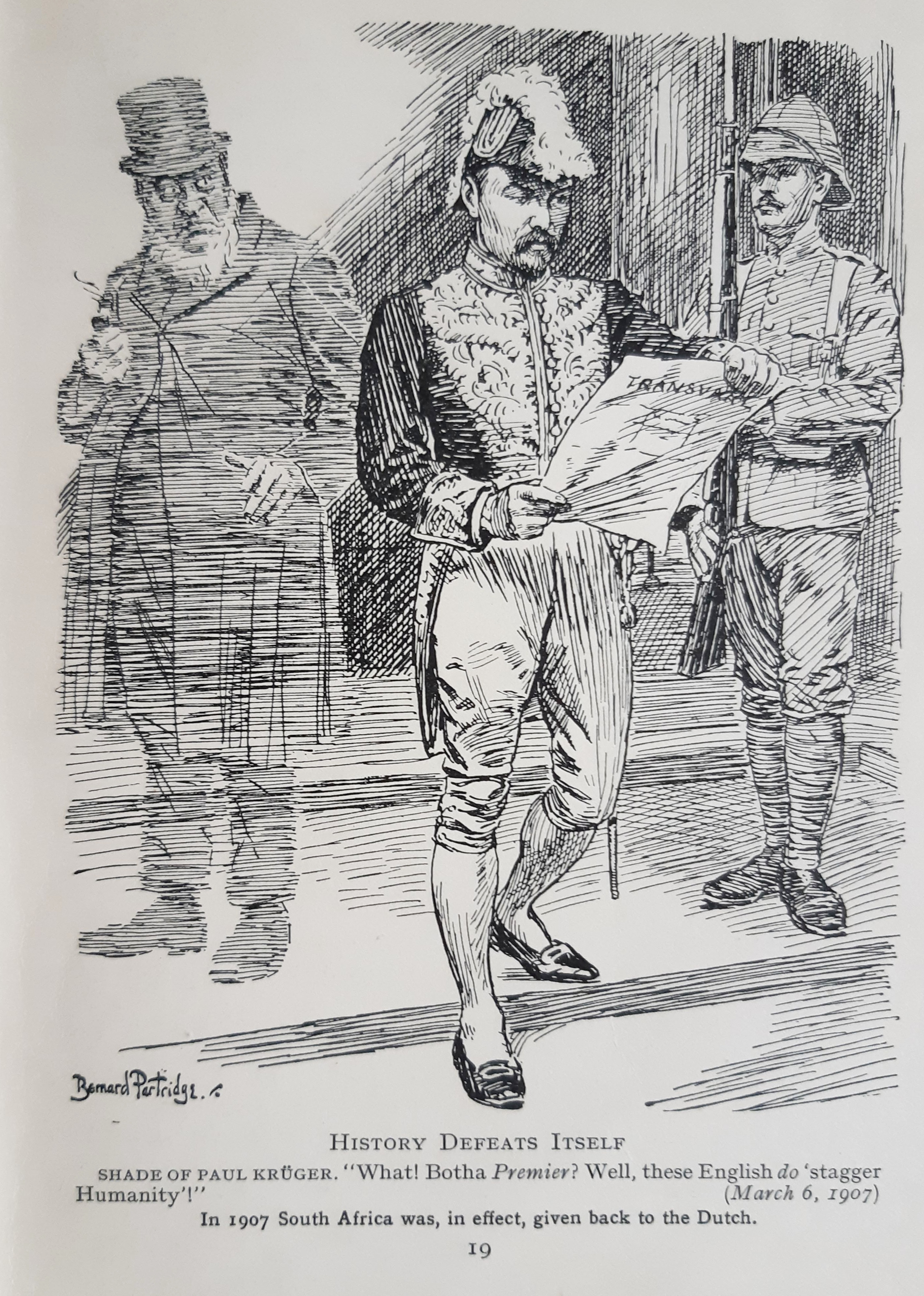
A Punch cartoon expressing surprise at Botha's appointment as Premier of the Transvaal Colony. The cartoon states: "SHADE OF PAUL KRUGER. "What! Botha Premier? Well, these English do 'stagger Humanity'!" In 1907 South Africa was, in effect, given back to the Dutch.", 6 March 1907.

Botha was prominent in efforts to achieve a peace with the British, representing the Boers at the peace negotiations in 1902, and was signatory to the Treaty of Vereeniging. In the period of reconstruction under British rule, Botha went to Europe with de Wet and de la Rey to raise funds to enable the Boers to resume their former avocations. Botha, who was still looked upon as the leader of the Boer people, took a prominent part in politics, advocating always measures which he considered as tending to the maintenance of peace and good order and the re-establishment of prosperity in the Transvaal. His war record made him prominent in the politics of Transvaal and he was a major player in the postwar reconstruction of that country, founding with Jan Smuts the Het Volk Party in the Transvaal Colony in 1904, which served as a springboard to campaign for responsible self-government for the colony.

After the grant of self-government to the Transvaal on 6 December 1906 and the success of his Het Volk Party at the first elections in February 1907, Botha was called upon by Lord Selborne to form a government as Prime Minister on 4 March 1907, and in the spring of the same year he took part in the conference of colonial premiers held in London. During his visit to England on this occasion General Botha declared the wholehearted adhesion of the Transvaal to the British Empire, and his intention to work for the welfare of the country regardless of racial differences. The following year Botha participated in the National Convention (South Africa) which opened up the way for the passage of the South Africa Act 1909 by the British parliament which in turn allowed for the formation of the Union of South Africa.

When South Africa obtained dominion status in 1910, Botha became the first Prime Minister of the Union of South Africa. In 1911, together with another Boer war hero, Jan Smuts, he formed the South African Party, or SAP. Widely viewed as too conciliatory with Britain, Botha faced revolts from within his own party and opposition from James Barry Munnik Hertzog's National Party. He was a South African Freemason. Botha, like Hertzog, advocated for the preservation of black traditions, which ultimately led to the segregation of the black and white races.

== Later career ==
After the First World War started, he sent troops to take German South-West Africa, a move unpopular among Boers, which provoked the Boer Revolt.

== Praise for the British ==
At Versailles on 1 June 1919, 17 years after the signing of the Treaty of Vereeniging, General Botha, now a member of the British Empire Delegation, put his hand on Lord Milner's shoulder, and said:

Seventeen years ago, my friend and I made peace at Vereeniging – it was a bitter peace for us, bitter hard. We lost all for which we had fought – our independence, our flag, our country. But we turned our thoughts and efforts then to saving our people; and they, the victors, helped us. It was a hard peace for us to accept, but as I know it now, when time has shown us the truth, it was not unjust – it was a generous peace that the British people made with us, and that is why we stand with them today side by side in the cause which has brought us all together."

At the end of the War he briefly led a British Military Mission to Poland during the Polish–Soviet War. He argued that the terms of the Versailles Treaty were too harsh on the Central Powers, but signed the treaty. Botha was unwell for most of 1919. He was plagued by fatigue and ill health that arose from his robust waistline.

== Marriage and children ==
Botha married Annie Emmett at the Dutch Reformed Church in Vryheid on 13 December 1886. Annie Botha later converted from Anglicanism to Dutch Reformed Protestantism. Shortly after their wedding, they settled on the Waterval Farm in Vryheid. They had five children together, three sons and two daughters.

== Death ==
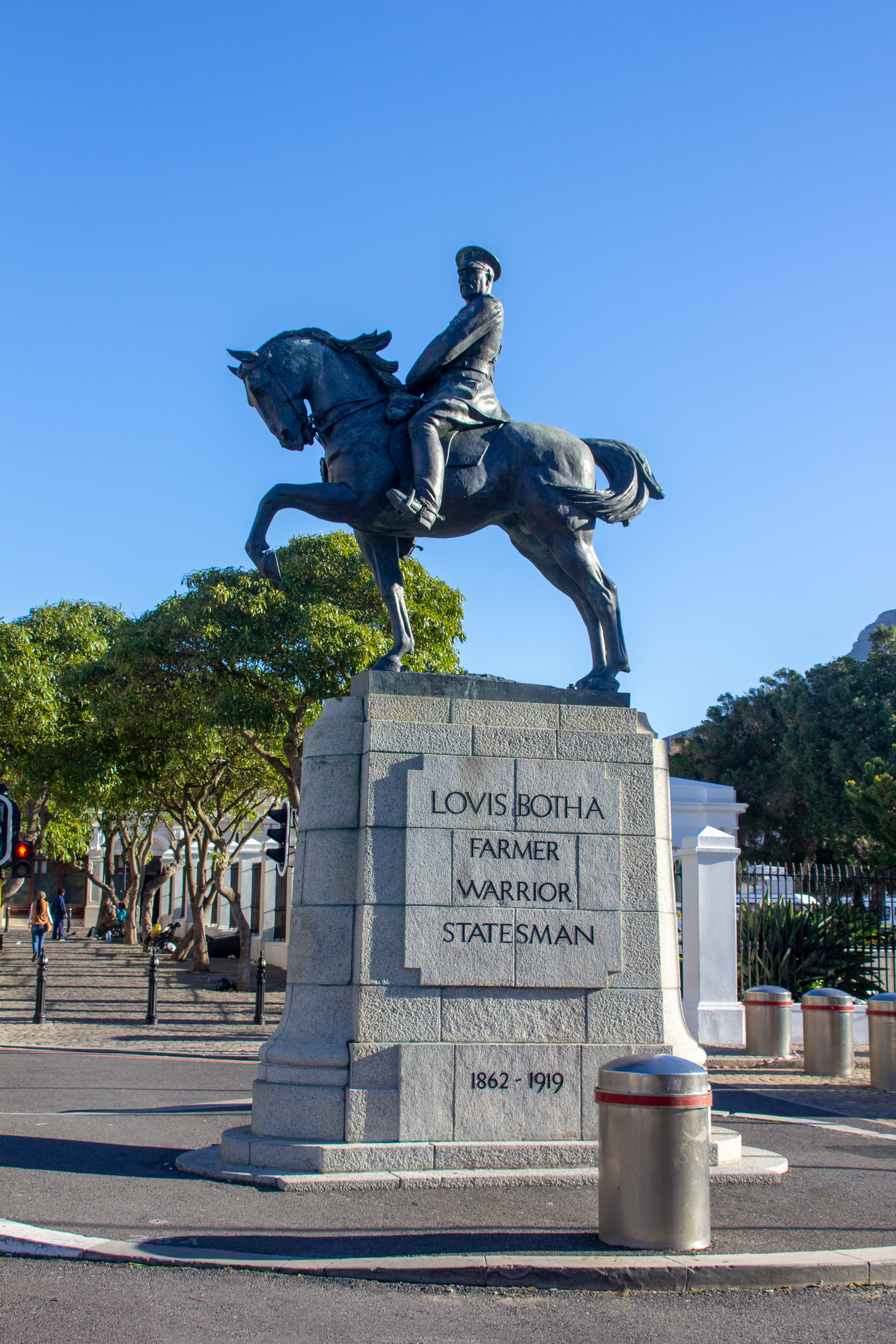
Statue near The Houses of Parliament, Cape Town by Romano Romanelli

General Louis Botha died of heart failure at his home following an attack of Spanish influenza on 27 August 1919 in the early hours of the morning. He was 56. His wife Annie was at home and was joined by Engelenburg who had acted as a private secretary to Botha. Botha was buried in Pretoria's Rebecca Street Cemetery.

Of Botha, Winston Churchill wrote in Great Contemporaries "The three most famous generals I have known in my life won no great battles over a foreign foe. Yet their names, which all begin with a 'B', are household words. They are General Booth, General Botha and General Baden-Powell..."

After Botha's death in 1919, Annie Botha settled on a farm in Rusthof and spent winters in Sezela, where she died in 1937.

== Honours ==
Sculptor Raffaello Romanelli won the competition to create the equestrian statue of Botha that stands in front of the South African Parliament building but died before completing it. His son Romano Romanelli, and his grandson's family Arend Botha was contracted to finish his father's work.

In 1917, parts of the M11 route in Johannesburg, previously named Morgan Road and Pretoria Main Road,were renamed to Louis Botha Avenue.

Sculptor Anton van Wouw created a statue of Botha in Durban unveiled in 1921.

Sculptor Coert Steynberg was commissioned to create the equestrian statue of Botha in front of the Union Buildings in Pretoria. It was unveiled in 1946.

The General Botha Regiment of the South African Army is named after Botha.

== Sources ==
- Churchill, Winston (1948) [1937]. Great Contemporaries. London: Odhams. 2001 reprint ISBN 978-1-931313-70-4.
- Churchill, Winston (1996). My Early Life: 1874–1904. Scribner. ISBN 978-0-684-82345-4.
- Coetzer, Owen (1996). The Anglo-Boer War: The road to Infamy, 1899–1900. W. Waterman. ISBN 978-1-874959-10-6.
- Engelenburg, Frans Vredenrijk (1928). General Louis Botha. J.L. Van Schaik.
- MacBride, John (2006). Jordan, Anthony J. (ed.). Boer War to Easter Rising: The Writings of John MacBride. Westport. ISBN 978-0-9524447-6-3.
- Meintjes, Johannes (1970). General Louis Botha: a biography. Cassell. ISBN 9780304935017.
- Texts on Wikisource:
- Peace of Vereeniging
- "Botha, Louis". Encyclopædia Britannica (12th ed.). 1922.
- Wrench, John Evelyn, Alfred Lord Milner, Eyre & Spottiswoode, London, 1958, pg. 238. OCLC Number: 1630758

Government offices
New title	Member of Parliament for Standerton; 1907–1910	Replaced by Transvaal Provincial Council
Political offices
New title	Prime Minister of the Transvaal; 1907–1910	Merged to form Union of South Africa
New title	Minister for Agriculture; 1907–1910	Merged to form Union of South Africa
House of Assembly of South Africa
Preceded by Theunis Frederik Jacobus Dreyer	Member of the House of Assembly for Losberg; 1915–1919	Succeeded by Theunis Frederik Jacobus Dreyer
Political offices
New title	Prime Minister of South Africa; 1910–1919	Succeeded by Jan Smuts
New title	Minister of Agriculture; 1910–1912	Succeeded by J. W. Sauer
Preceded by J. W. Sauer	Minister of Agriculture; 1912–1913	Succeeded by Harry van Heerden
Preceded by J. W. Sauer	Minister of Native Affairs; 1913–1919	Succeeded by Jan Smuts
Party political offices
New title	Leader of the Het Volk Party; 1904–1911	Merged to form South African Party
New title	Leader of the South African Party; 1910–1919	Succeeded by Jan Smuts
