= Borckenhagen =

Borckenhagen is a German surname. Notable people with the surname include:

- Carl Borckenhagen (1852–1898), South African journalist and political leader
- Ludwig Borckenhagen (1850–1917), German admiral
