= Rudolf von Delbrück =

Prussian statesman (1817–1903)

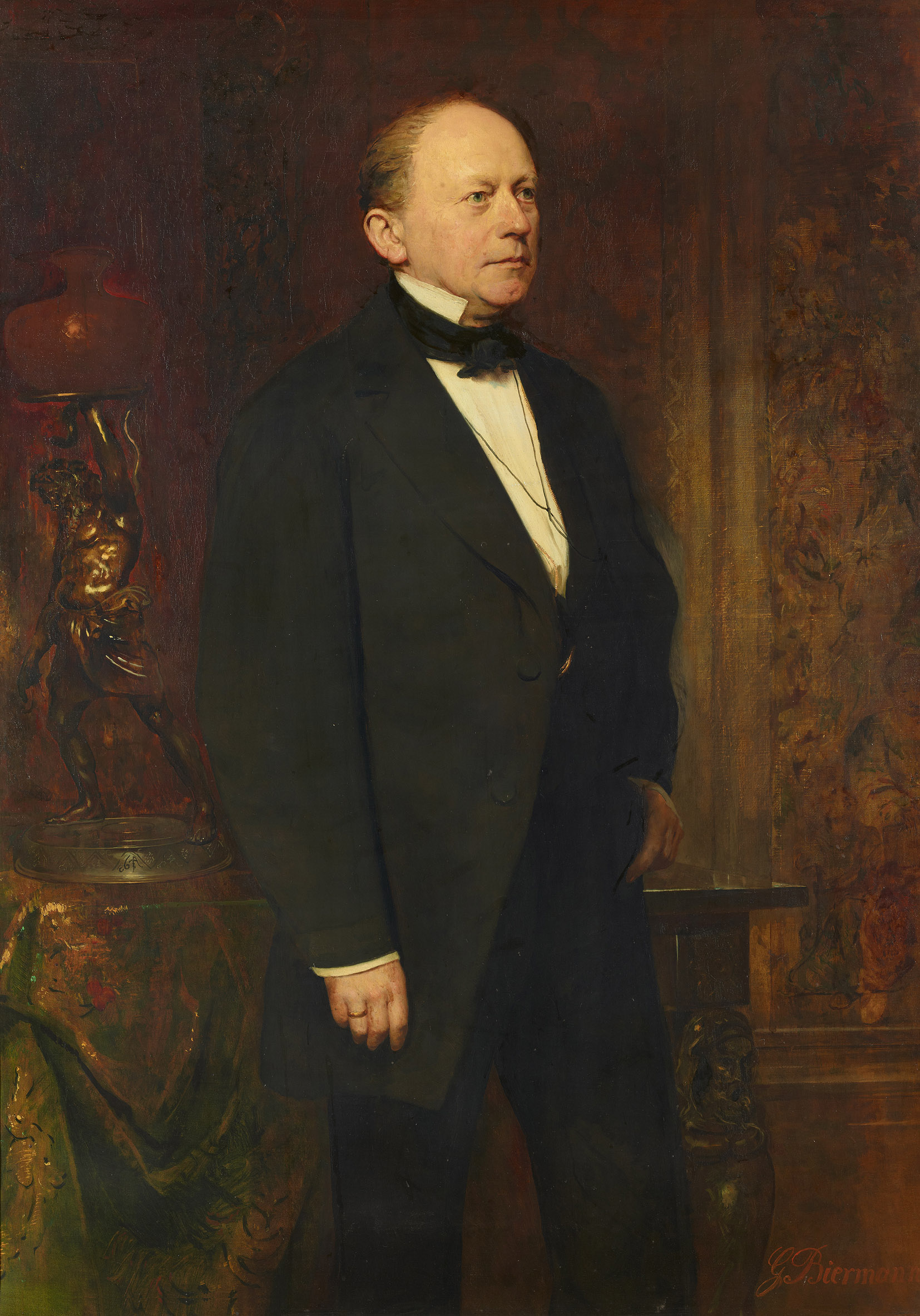
- Rudolf von Delbrück, Portrait by Gottlieb Biermann (1875).

Personal details
- Born: 16 April 1817 Berlin, Province of Brandenburg, Kingdom of Prussia
- Died: 1 February 1903 (aged 85) Berlin, Province of Brandenburg, Kingdom of Prussia
- Resting place: Berlin, Germany

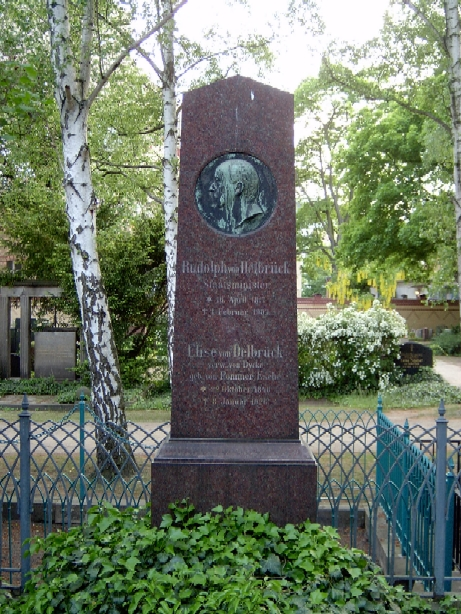
Tombstone of von Delbrück, Berlin.

Martin Friedrich Rudolf von (Note: In German personal names, von is a preposition which approximately means 'of' or 'from' and usually denotes some sort of nobility. While von (always lower case) is part of the family name or territorial designation, not a first or middle name, if the noble is referred to by their last name, use Schiller, Clausewitz or Goethe, not von Schiller, etc.) Delbrück (German pronunciation: [ˈʁuːdɔlf fɔn ˈdɛl.bʁʏk]; 16 April 1817 – 1 February 1903) was a Prussian statesman at the time of Otto von Bismarck.

== Early life ==
Delbrück was born in Berlin, Province of Brandenburg. He came from a distinguished family, his father Johann Friedrich Gottlieb Delbrück (d. 1830) having been preceptor of the two Prussian princes afterwards known as King Frederick William IV and Emperor William I. Rudolf von Delbrück studied in Halle, Bonn, and Berlin. On completing his legal studies, he entered the service of the state in 1837; and after holding a series of minor posts was transferred in 1848 to the ministry of commerce, which was to be the sphere of his life's work.

== Career ==
The states of the German Confederation, including Prussia and the Austrian Empire, had realized the influence of commercial upon political union. Delbrück in 1851 induced Hanover, Oldenburg, and Schaumburg-Lippe, who formed the Steuerverein, to join the Zollverein; the southern states, which had agreed to admit Austria to the union, found themselves forced in 1853 to renew the old union, from which Austria was excluded. Delbrück now began, with the support of Otto von Bismarck, to apply the principles of free trade to Prussian fiscal policy.

In 1862 Delbrück concluded an important commercial treaty with France. In 1867 he became the first president of the chancery of the North German Confederation, and represented Bismarck on the federal tariff council (Zollbundesrath), a position of political as well as fiscal importance owing to the presence in the council of representatives of the southern states. In 1868 he became a Prussian minister without portfolio. In October 1870, when the union of Germany under Prussian headship became a practical question, Delbrück was chosen to go on a mission to the South German states, and contributed greatly to the agreements concluded at Versailles in November.

== Later life ==
In 1871 Delbrück became president of the newly constituted Reichskanzleramt. Delbrück, however, began to feel himself uneasy under Bismarck's leanings towards protection and state control. On the introduction of Bismarck's plan for the acquisition of the railways by the state, Delbrück resigned office, nominally on the ground of ill health (June 1, 1876). In 1879 he opposed in the Reichstag the new protectionist tariff, and on the failure of his efforts retired definitely from public life in 1881. In 1897 he received from William II the Order of the Black Eagle. He died in Berlin.

== Awards ==
German honours

- Prussia:
  - Iron Cross (1870), 2nd Class with White Band and Black Edge
  - Knight of the Royal Crown Order, 1st Class with Enamel Band of the Red Eagle and Oak Leaves, 22 March 1875
  - Grand Cross of the Red Eagle, with Oak Leaves, 31 May 1876
  - Knight of the Black Eagle, with Collar, 18 January 1897
- Anhalt: Grand Cross of the Order of Albert the Bear, 1869
- Baden: Grand Cross of the Zähringer Lion, 1867; with Golden Collar, 1871
- Bavaria:
  - Commander of Merit of St. Michael, 1853
  - Grand Cross of Merit of the Bavarian Crown, 1871
- Brunswick: Grand Cross of the Order of Henry the Lion, 2nd Class, 1853
- (Saxe-Coburg and Gotha) (Duchy of Saxe-Altenburg) (Saxe-Meiningen) Ernestine duchies: Grand Cross of the Saxe-Ernestine House Order, 1873
- Hanover: Commander of the Royal Guelphic Order, 2nd Class
- Hesse and by Rhine:
  - Commander of the Ludwig Order, 1st Class, 10 August 1860
  - Grand Cross of the Merit Order of Philip the Magnanimous, 6 May 1871
- Mecklenburg: Grand Cross of the Wendish Crown
- Oldenburg: Grand Cross of Honour of the Order of Duke Peter Friedrich Ludwig
- Nassau: Commander of the Order of Adolphe of Nassau, 1st Class
- Saxe-Weimar-Eisenach: Grand Cross of the White Falcon, 1871
- Saxony: Grand Cross of the Albert Order, with Silver Star, 1865

Foreign honours

- Austrian Empire:
  - Knight of the Iron Crown, 2nd Class, 1853
  - Grand Cross of the Imperial Order of Leopold, 1872
- Belgium: Grand Cordon of the Order of Leopold
- Empire of Brazil: Grand Cross of the Rose
- French Empire: Grand Officer of the Legion of Honour
- Kingdom of Italy: Grand Cross of Saints Maurice and Lazarus
- Luxembourg: Grand Cross of the Oak Crown
- Persian Empire: Order of the Lion and the Sun, 1st Class
- Russian Empire: Knight of the White Eagle
- (Thailand) Siam: Grand Cross of the White Elephant
- Sweden-Norway: Grand Cross of St. Olav, 1 June 1875
