= Central German Commercial Union =

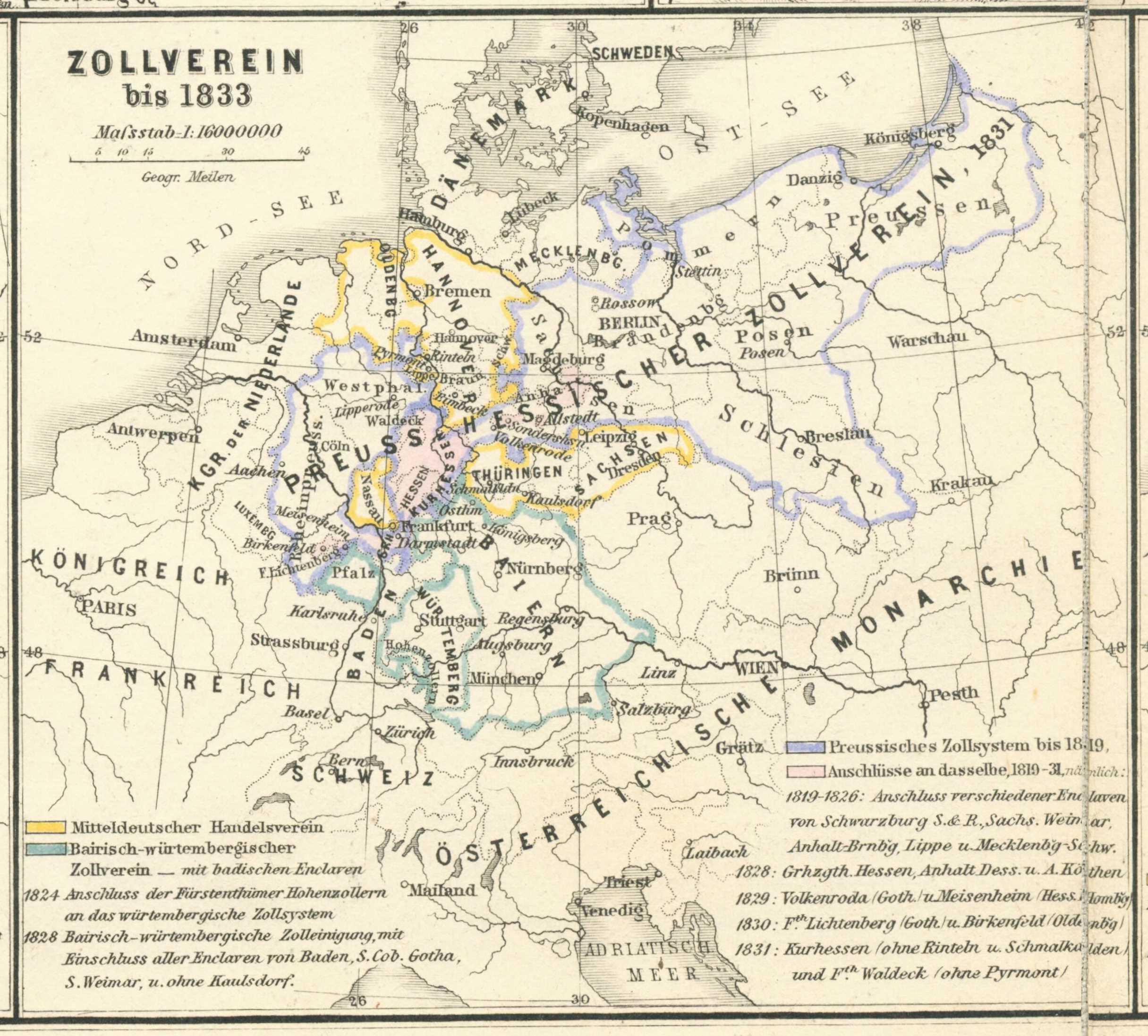
The Central German Commercial Union on a map of 1872

The Central German Commercial Union (German: mitteldeutsche Handelsverein) was a customs union created in 1828 by several small states within the German Confederation. It was formed in response to the creation of the Prussian-Hessian Customs Union, and was intended as an alternative to a union dominated by the Kingdom of Prussia. The key proponent of the union was the Kingdom of Saxony and most of the smaller states of Northern Germany were initially members, but the union failed to implement any concrete measures and was a dead letter by 1833. Most members joined the Prussian-led German Zollverein in 1834.

== History ==
Map of the Central German Commercial Union (upper map, pink outline) and the Prussian-Hessian Customs Union (upper map, grey), as of 1828.

The Grand Duchy of Hesse agreed to the formation of the a customs union with Prussia in 1828, the Prussian-Hessian Customs Union, effectively becoming part of the Prussian toll system. In response, several small and medium-sized German states launched a counter-initiative, since they feared that such a union would allow Prussia to dominate the German Confederation economically and politically. The Kingdom of Saxony spearheaded the initial efforts to create a separate customs and commercial union, along with Saxe-Weimar-Eisenach and Saxe-Coburg. They were supported in their efforts by the United Kingdom and the Empire of Austria, since they also wished to limit Prussian influence. On 21 May 1828, the Kingdom of Hannover, the Electorate of Hesse, the Free City of Frankfurt, the Duchy of Nassau, Saxe-Coburg and Gotha, Saxe-Altenburg, and Schwarzburg-Rudolstadt decided not to join any other customs union within the following three years. This would prevent the accession of further states to the Prussian-Hessian Union. Later, the other Thuringian states, the Duchy of Brunswick, the Grand Duchy of Oldenburg, the Free City of Bremen, and Hesse-Homburg also made this pledge.

The states then began negotiations to form their own customs union. A treaty for the promotion of free trade and movement was signed in Kassel on 24 September 1828. This treaty confirmed the ban on joining another customs union, with an exception for enclaves. However, the other terms of the treaty were very vague and unambitious. For example, the states agreed not to establish further transit tolls between one another and that they would "support" further trade with one another. The agreement was set to expire in 1834.

In fact, the union had lost its significance even before 1834. The pact could only be effective with a transit toll or trade barrier for goods going into the Prussian-Hessian zone. However, no unified customs regime for the union was introduced and no unified trade area was created. Through enticements and pressure, the Prussians were successful in persuading some of the Central German union's members to leave. It was especially weakened when the Electorate of Hesse joined the Prussian-Hessian Customs Union in 1831. The end came in 1833, with the formation of the Customs and Commercial Union of the Thuringian States. The Thuringian Union and most remaining states of the Central German Union joined the German Zollverein in 1834, while Hannover, Brunswick, and then Oldenberg formed the Steuerverein, which remained outside the Zollverein until 1854.

== Bibliography ==
- Jürgen Angelow. Der Deutsche Bund. Wiss. Buchgesellschaft, Darmstadt 2003, ISBN 3-534-15152-6, p. 63.
- Wolfram Siemann. Vom Staatenbund zum Nationalstaat. Deutschland 1807–1871. Beck, München 1995, ISBN 3-406-30819-8, pp. 339f.
- Werner, Oliver. "Mitteldeutscher Handelsverein." in Andreas C. Hofmann (ed.): Lexikon zu Restauration und Vormärz. Deutsche Geschichte 1815 bis 1848 Online
- Hubert Kiesewetter. Industrielle Revolution in Deutschland: Regionen als Wachstumsmotoren. Verlag Franz Steiner, 2004, p. 48f.
