= South German Customs Union =

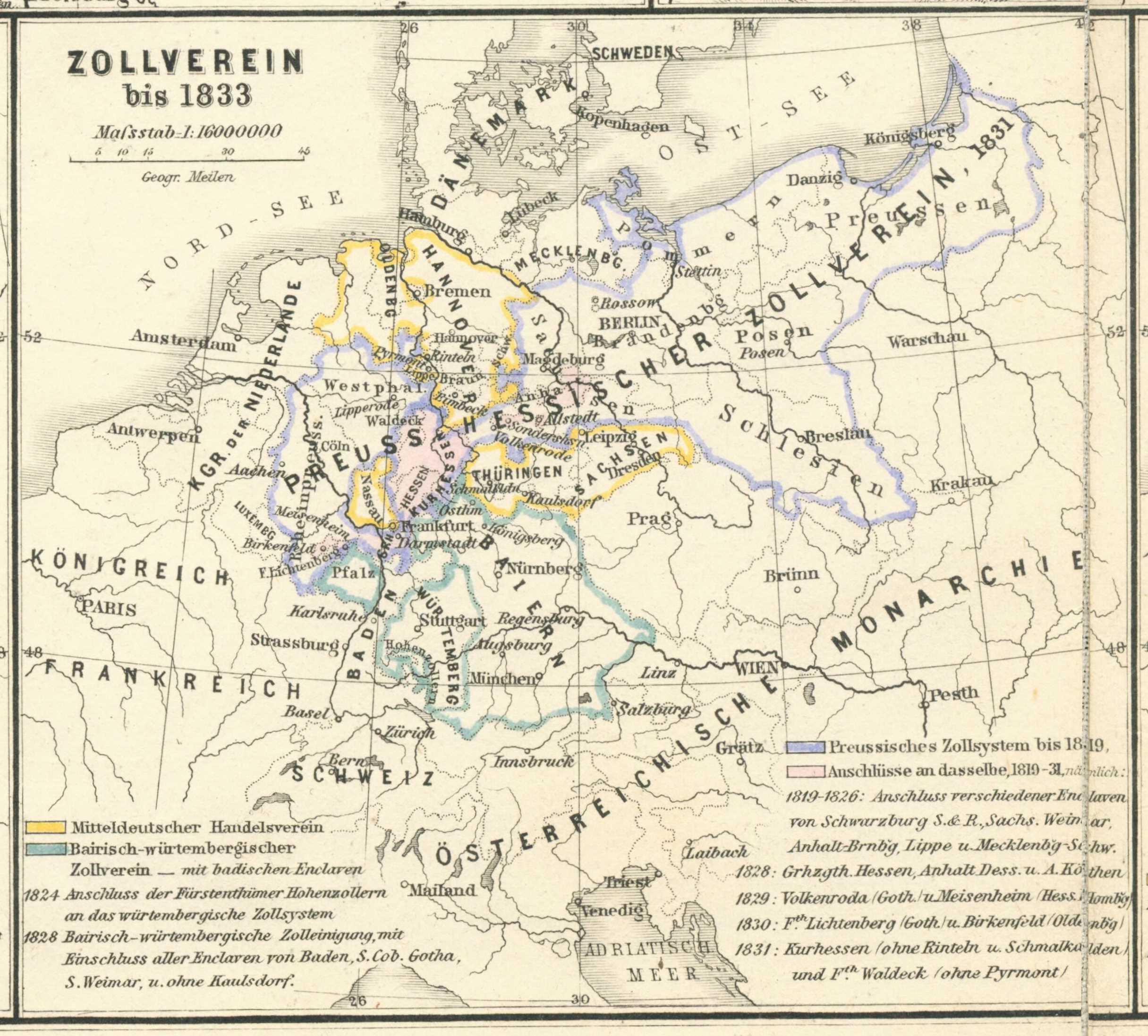
The South German Customs Union on a map of 1872

The South German Customs Union (German: Süddeutscher Zollverein) was an attempt by various states in the German Confederation to create a unified customs area, in the early stages of German unification. After several failed attempts to bring in other states, a customs treaty was agreed between the Kingdom of Bavaria and the Kingdom of Württemberg in 1828. It was incorporated into the Prussian-led Zollverein in 1834.

== First negotiation in 1820 ==
On 19 May 1820, the south German states of Baden, Bavaria, Hesse-Darmstadt, and Württemberg, along with some small central German states signed the Vienna Punctation, a declaration of intent, in which they obliged themselves to negotiate the establishment of a customs union. These negotiations took place in September of the same year in Darmstadt. However, in these negotiations, it became clear that the interests of the different states differed greatly. Bavaria and Württemberg pushed for a protectionist union with high external tariffs, while Baden, Nassau, and Hesse-Darmstadt wanted a free trade agreement. The only thing that all states were in agreement on was their fear of political and economic dominance by Prussia.

At the end of November 1820, the Badian civil servant and economist Karl Friedrich Nebenius presented a draft treaty to serve as a basis for negotiations. Due to various geographic and economic factors, no agreement was reached. Nebenius' draft proposed that the total income from tolls by divided between member states on the basis of their population and the length of their borders, which clearly favoured Baden. Bavaria, the largest state by area, responded by pushing for division on the basis of population and area. Another point of contention was where the toll would be levied. The greatest obstacle of all, however, was the divergent economic interests of the participating states. The states on the Rhine were interested in free trade policies as a natural result of their geographic situation, while states that were not on key internal trade routes had an interest in high, protective tariffs, so that their local industries, which had supplied their local markets without problem up to this point, would not be threatened. Added to this was the "Sponheim question", a conflict between Bavaria and Baden over territories that had been divided between them in the Palatinate, which strained the relationship between the two states. As negotiations had become totally bogged down, the Hessian hosts of the meeting ended their participation on 3 July 1823, in favour of modernising their own customs system, since they no longer believed that an interstate agreement was likely to be agreed.

The negotiations finally failed when the small Thuringian states agreed the Treaty of Arnstadt amongst themselves in December 1822, seeking first to unify themselves, before engaging with larger projects. In the following period, there were several bilateral agreements. For example, Hesse-Darmstadt and Baden agreed a trade treaty on 10 September 1824 (although this did not last long). It provided for customs-free, low-tariff trade in various products and provided for further revision of the customs law. These efforts led most states to consider making another attempt at forming a customs union.

== Second negotiation in 1825 ==
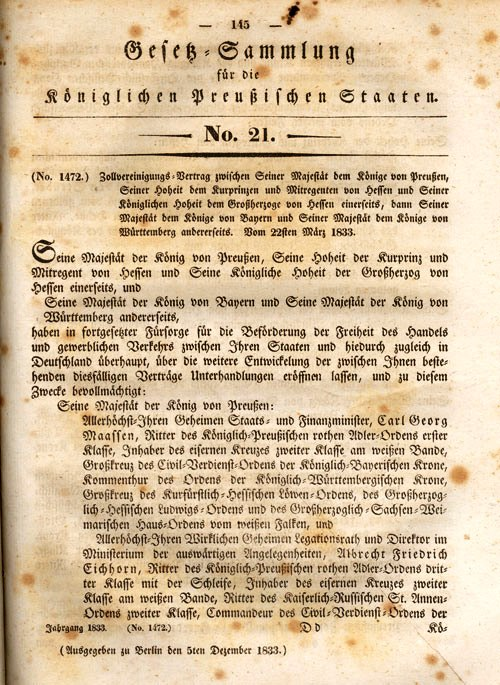
Prussian gazette with a copy of the customs union treaty between the Prussian-Hessian Customs Union and the South German Customs Union, 22 March 1833

Bavaria and Württemberg agreed a shared proposal in October 1824 and in November of the same year Hesse-Darmstadt and Baden agreed a shared procedure in the Heidelberg protocol. In general, the states had learnt from the earlier negotiations in Darmstadt and were prepared to compromise. Thus, new negotiations began in February 1825 in Stuttgart on a South German Customs Union between Baden, Bavaria, Hesse-Darmstadt, Nassau, and Württemberg. However, once more there was no agreement on tariff policy. The relationship between Baden and Bavaria was still so fraught as a result of the Sponheim Question, that an agreement between these two rivals was not a possibility. Baden abandoned the Stuttgart conference on 6 August 1825, Nassau and Hesse-Darmstadt followed shortly thereafter. The changes made to the Badian customs system when it was realised that the Stuttgart conference would collapse led the Hessian government to cancel their agreement with Hesse at the beginning of 1826 and found the Prussian-Hessian Customs Union instead.

Nevertheless, this conference further deepened the efforts to unify the customs systems of Bavaria and Württemberg. Thus, on 12 April 1827, another preliminary treaty was agreed. The government of Baden, Hesse-Darmstadt, and Nassau were invited to join, but refused. After this, Bavaria and Württemberg signed the treaty founding the South German Customs Union on 18 January 1828. From 20 December 1829, the Circle of the Rhine (the large Bavarian exclave on the Rhine), was completely integrated into the South German Customs Union as well.

== Provisions ==
The provisions of the South German Customs Union were as follows:

- The toll stations on the shared borders were closed and all further tolls, both at the borders and at internal toll stations were paid into a shared account.
- Both governments repealed regulations and treaties with states that did not belong to the union.
- The profit from the tolls was divided between the states based on their population, which was determined by a full census every three years.
- In each state, there was a single, independent customs administration and each of these had a permanent general plenipotentiary from the other state with clearly defined authority for inspections and investigations.
- There was a unified administration for checking toll payments in both states.
- The annual settlement took place between the customs administrations on the basis of monthly records.
- General ordinances could only be made together, except in urgent cases.
- Customs employees came under the exclusive oversight of their own state, but they were answerable to the union through a defined formula.
- The costs of general administration, pensions, leave payments and other administrative costs were paid by the income of the Union.
- Police jurisdiction over market visits, small-scale trade, and details of commercial privileges remained under the control of the individual state administrations.
- Recouping the cost of all customs exemptions was the responsibility of the government that issued them.
- All existing storage and packaging rights were abolished. For warehouses and customs offices, a maximum was set for each state and transgressions could be charged to the offending state.
- Tolls on roads, waterways, bridges, paved streets, cranes, shipyards, and similar fees remained in private hands, but tolls on roads and waterways could never exceed 2 Pf. in a hundred.
- Tolls on bridges and paved streets were never to be levied for profit.
- Consumer contributions that were charged at specific internal points of use could be charged at the same amount by either state of the Union, even on objects of the same type which came from a country bordering the Union.
- The Salzregal (salt-mining right) was maintained in both states and special limitations on the importation and transport of salt were introduced.
- For the discussion of common affairs of the Union, there was an annual general congress, attended by two representatives of each state, with a rotating chair. This congress was tasked with agreeing necessary changes to the basic treaty, administrative organisation, customs ordinances, and tariff rates, with checking the administrative accounts, with establishing the total income, setting the budget, and resolving complaints and disputes. In the final case, the congress was the venue for concluding informed compromises.
- Bavarian weights and measures were used as the basis for tariffs and tolls.

== End of the Union ==
The South German Customs Union faced significant problems. 44% of its income was lost to administrative costs. The union's per capita income was only 9.5 Groschen, while the Prussia-Hessian Customs Union made 24 Groschen per capita. The total area of the participating states was proved too small to sustain their own union. Since it was clear that there would be no union between Austria and Prussia, Bavaria and Württemberg had to choose one of them as a partner. Since Austria could not give up its own closed system, joining Prussia was the only remaining option. Therefore, Bavaria and Württemberg signed a treaty uniting their customs union with that of Prussia and Hesse-Darmstadt on 22 March 1833. On 1 January 1834, the treaty came into effect and the new German Customs Union (the Zollverein) was formed.

The South German Customs Union was responsible for the introduction of the systematic census. It also played a role in the unification of German weights and measures, a process which the German Customs Union of 1834 brought to completion.

== Bibliography ==
- Hahn, Hans-Werner (1984). Geschichte des Deutschen Zollvereins. Göttingen: Vandenhoeck & Ruprecht. ISBN 3-525-33500-8. OCLC 11501632.
- Müller, Hans Peter (1984). Das Großherzogtum Baden und die deutsche Zolleinigung, 1819-1835/36. Frankfurt am Main: Peter Lang. ISBN 3-8204-5447-0. OCLC 11569280. (Zugleich: Frankfurt am Main, Univ., Diss., 1982).
- C. F. Nebenius: Denkschrift für den Beitritt Badens zu dem zwischen Preußen, Bayern, Würtemberg, den beiden Hessen und mehren andern deutschen Staaten abgeschlossenen Zollverein. C. F. Müller, Karlsruhe 1833.
- Heinrich von Treitschke: Die Gründung des Deutschen Zollvereins. Voigtländer, Leipzig 1913
- Ullmann, Hans-Peter (1992). Handbuch der baden-württembergischen Geschichte / 3 Vom Ende des Alten Reiches bis zum Ende der Monarchien. Hansmartin Schwarzmaier, Meinrad Schaab. Stuttgart: Klett-Cotta. pp. 63–78. ISBN 3-608-91467-6. OCLC 644015532.
- von Weber, Wilhelm (1871). Der deutsche Zollverein (Geschichte seiner Entstehung und Entwicklung) (2 ed.). Leipzig: Veit & Comp. pp. 50–51.
