= Friedrich von Blittersdorf =

Politician in the Holy Roman Empire (1792–1861)

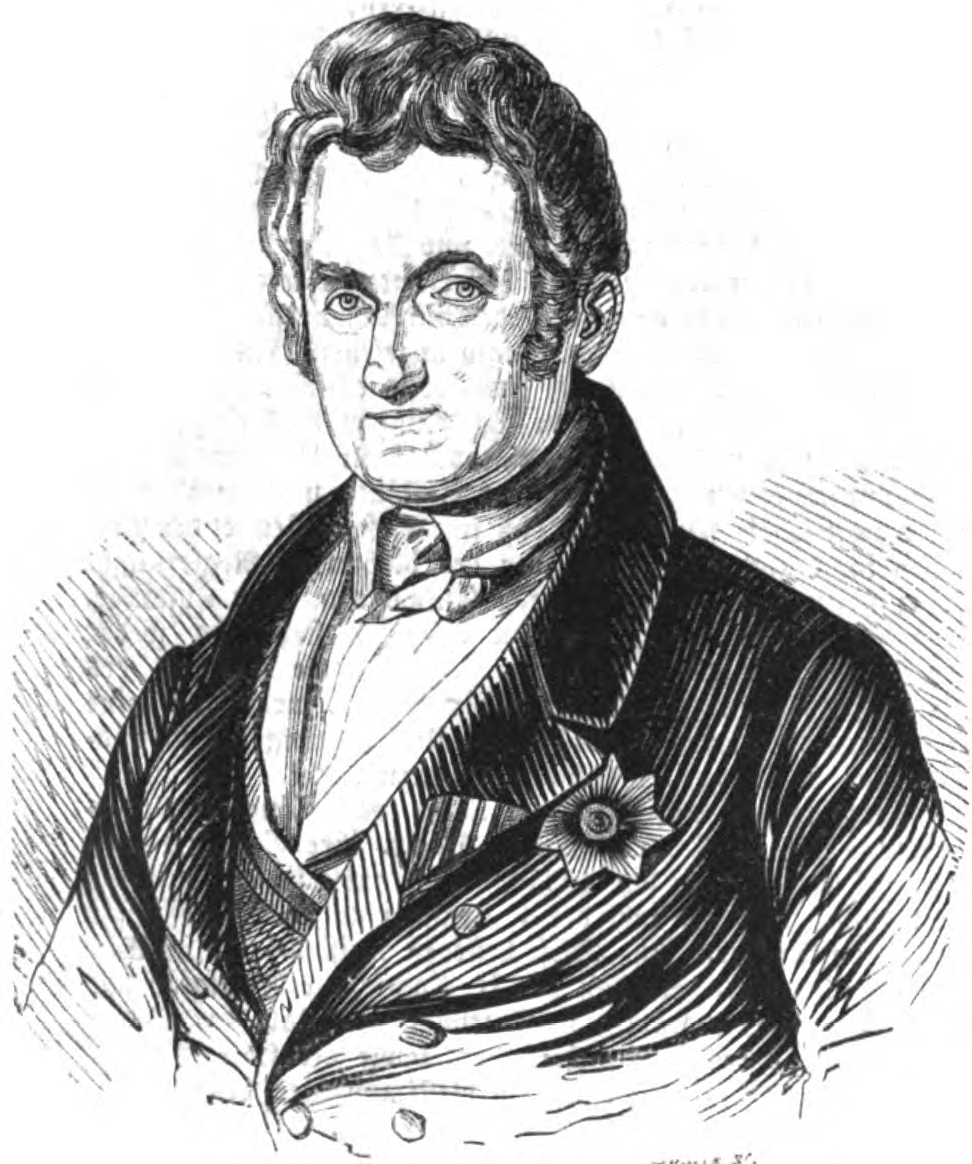
- Friedrich Landolin Karl Freiherr von Blittersdorf 1845
- Born: Friedrich Landolin Karl Blittersdorf; 14 February 1792; Mahlberg, Baden, Holy Roman Empire
- Died: 16 April 1861 (aged 69); Frankfurt
- Education: Heidelberg; Freiburg
- Occupations: diplomat politician government officer
- Spouse: Maximiliane Brentano di Tremezzo (1802-1861)
- Children: Antonie 1825; Ludovica 1827; Ludwig 1829; Hildegarde 1846
- Parent(s): Wilhelm von Blittersdorf (1748–1798); Franziska Freiin von Vischpach (1758-1835)

Friedrich Landolin Karl Freiherr von Blittersdorf (14 February 1792 - 16 April 1861) was a long serving politician-administrator in the Grand Duchy of Baden. As a younger man he served in a succession of ambassadorial roles and undertook other diplomatic work. Between 1835 and 1844 he became a dominating force in the government. He approached his responsibilities with huge erudition and energy, combined with a powerfully conservative set of political instincts. In this respect he contrasted with his cautiously reformist predecessor as head of the government, Ludwig Georg Winter.

== Life ==
=== Provenance and early years ===
Blittersdorf(f) was born in Mahlberg, down-river from Basel on the right (German) side. He was a younger son. His father, Wilhelm von Blittersdorf (1748–1798), was a senior government administrator ("Hofrat", "Kämmerer" and "Landvogt") and the governor of Mahlberg. His mother, born Franziska Freiin von Vischpach (1758-1835), was from a Protestant family. He attended school in Karlsruhe and then moved on to university at Heidelberg (where in 1809 he joined the Corps Rhenania fraterntity) and Freiburg, studying jurisprudence.

=== Public service ===
In 1813, on the recommendation of Baron von Marschall, Blittersdorf was assigned a government post as secretary to the Mission to the Kingdom of Württemberg, on which von Marschall was about to embark. He felt that the Stuttgart appointment did not suit him and in 1814 he tried, without success, to obtain a government job on the home front. In the aftermath of the Napoleonic Wars the opportunities for government work were evidently to be found in the international field. In 1816 he accompanied Baron von Berstett in the capacity of "councillor" ("Legationsrat"), a member of Baden's delegation, led by Berstett, to the "Federal Convention" ("Bundesversammlung des) Deutschen Bundes") in Frankfurt.

In 1817 von Blittersdorf was appointed to the privy council ("Geheime Cabinet des Großherzogs"), also appointed, that same year, to a position in the foreign ministry. In 1818 he was appointed Chargé d'affaires to the imperial court at St. Petersburg. It was his first senior diplomatic posting. Nevertheless, he was required to stop off, as he traveled east, for a negotiation with Chancellor Metternich over important territorial and succession issues concerning Baden. Towards the end of 1819 he was due a period of leave and travelled home via Vienna where he received an instruction to stay and support von Berstett who was heading up the Baden delegation in preparations for the Vienna Ministerial Conference. Von Blittersdorf now made an important contribution to the drafting of what came to be known as the "Final Settlement" (" Schlussakte") which clarified the new German Confederation's inter-relationships.

In 1820 von Blittersdorf was sent back to the "Bundestag" (as the "Federal Convention") at Frankfurt is sometimes identified in sources) as Baden's representative. By now he was clearly aligning himself with conservative, lining up to resist liberalising tendencies identified as emanating from the representatives from Württemberg and Bavaria. He was resolute in his opposition to Baden's 1818 constitution. He believed that the German confederation could best be secured of the individual states within it retained their individual sovereignty. A couple of years later, in September 1822, he was reporting to Chancellor Metternich on alarming trends in Baden itself. The people, for the most part, conducted themselves in a good and orderly manner. The danger came from the importation of liberals into the government hierarchy. He urged that his prince should ensure the effectiveness of his servants [in the government] through a technique combining "fear and hope" ("Nur durch Furcht und Hoffnung vermag sich der Regent seiner Diener zu versichern"). He favoured "the monarchist ideal" and "aristocratic principles" over the democratic sentiments that continued to circulate in the aftermath of the French Revolution and the ensuing wars. When he visited Metternich in Vienna, the latter was characteristically non-committal. In a note to an assistant he wrote in the language of international diplomacy, "I will receive him with all my usual candour, but I will restrict myself to generalities" ("Je le recevrai avec toute la franchise de mon caractère, mais je me tiendrai avec lui dans les generalités."). Von Blittersdorf was back in Vienna in a diplomatic capacity in 1823. He continued to serve as an envoy to the "Bundestag" till 1835.

Friedrich von Blittersdorf married at Frankfurt am Main in 1824. His bride was Maximiliane Euphrosine Kunigunde Brentano di Tremezzo, like him from a family of government administrators. At least four children would be born to the couple between 1825 and 1846.

In 1835 he was appointed to the position of Foreign Minister of Grand Duchy of Baden. As a result of his energy and the force of his personality he quickly became the dominating figure in the government, although Ludwig Georg Winter, formally the head of the government till he died in 1838, seems to have kept von Blittersdorf in some sort of check. In 1838 Karl Friedrich Nebenius, an out and out liberal and the author of the 1818 constitution, became Minister for the Interior (Innenminister), but had to resign in October 1839 due to "differences" with the conservative von Blittersdorf who now himself became Minister-President, and effectively, the head of government. He quickly found himself in a state of virtually permanent conflict with the "parliament", and relations became yet more confrontational after elections in 1841. Eventually, towards the end of 1843, the Grand Duke felt he could no longer sign off on von Blittersdorf's ever more conservative measures: in November it was the Minister-President who resigned, returning to his former role as the Grand Duchy's envoy to the "Bundestag". He resigned in March 1848. He saw the revolution as vindication of his determination to crack down on liberal tendencies, and lived out his final years at Frankfurt, by now a withdrawn and embittered figure.

== Awards and honours ==
- 1827 Grand Cross: Order of the Zähringer Lion
- 1840 Knight's Cross: House Order of Fidelity
