= Ludwig Borckenhagen =

Friedrich Ludwig Wilhelm Carl Borckenhagen
- Born: July 15, 1850; Minden, Germany
- Died: June 17, 1917 (aged 66); Berlin, Germany
- Spouse: Margarete Clara Kapp
- Military career
- Allegiance: German Empire
- Branch: Imperial German Navy
- Service years: 1868-1909
- Rank: Admiral
- Commands: SMS Habicht; SMS Pfeil; SMS Wacht; SMS Blitz; SMS Prinzess Wilhelm; SMS Blücher; SMS Wörth; I Scouting Group; German Imperial Naval Academy

Friedrich Ludwig Wilhelm Carl Borckenhagen (15 July 1850 – 17 June 1917) was an Admiral in the Imperial German Navy. He was also an influential writer on naval strategy, and pivotal in introducing the ideas of geostrategist Alfred Thayer Mahan into the German Empire.

== Early life and career ==
Borckenhagen was born in the Rodenbeck subdistrict of Minden, Westphalia, the son of Johann Ludwig Friedrich Borckenhagen (1818-1870), and his wife Julie Emilie Helene Seydel (1820-1888). His younger brother Carl Borckenhagen was later to emigrate to South Africa and become an immensely powerful political leader there.

He joined the Prussian Navy as a young cadet on 26 April 1868, and went to sail with the frigates Gefion and Niobe, as well as the battleships König Wilhelm and Elisabeth. In 1871 he served in the Baltic Ostseeflotte before studying further at the Naval Academy in Kiel.

In Berlin, on 25 September 1881, he married Margarete Clara Kapp (daughter of Friedrich Kapp and Louise Engels) and the couple had two daughters, Luise and Fritze.

== Influence on naval strategy ==
In the ensuing years he rapidly rose in rank, alternating his successively higher commands with further studies at the Kiel Naval Academy.

At this time, he also authored a series of enormously influential papers on naval strategy. Two of his early review articles constituted the first discussion on naval power and strategy in the German Empire. He also introduced the ideas of geostrategist Alfred Thayer Mahan to the Prussian Empire, even personally translating Mahan's work, "The Influence of Sea Power upon History" into German.

While Borckenhagen greatly emphasized the lag in naval development between Germany and its competitors, many of his recommendations centered on the principal need for the Prussian military to invest heavily in naval power. This suggestion, which drew from his study of history and of Mahan's writings, was subsequently taken to the extreme by the Kaiser's government, and led Germany to engage in the Anglo-German naval arms race.

== High command and admiralty ==
Portion of the Imperial High Seas Fleet

In the 1890s, he commanded a range of battleships, whilst also serving in the Naval High Command.

After successfully serving in the far East, he rose to be Chief of Staff and 2 Admiral of the 1st Squadron. In early 1903, he became the first commander of I Scouting Group, the main reconnaissance force for the German fleet. He served as director of the Naval Academy from 22 September 1903 (the second independent director in its history), then from 30 March 1907 as Inspector of Education for the Navy. In an unusually egalitarian move, he was influential in proposing that study of naval history and strategy should be made available even to the lowest-ranking naval staff.

He was recalled back to service as Admiral at the beginning of the First World War. However his utility in the field of strategy and planning caused him to be posted as Reichskommissar at the Oberprisengericht in Berlin, where he served until his death on 17 June 1917.
