= Frederick Schermbrucker =

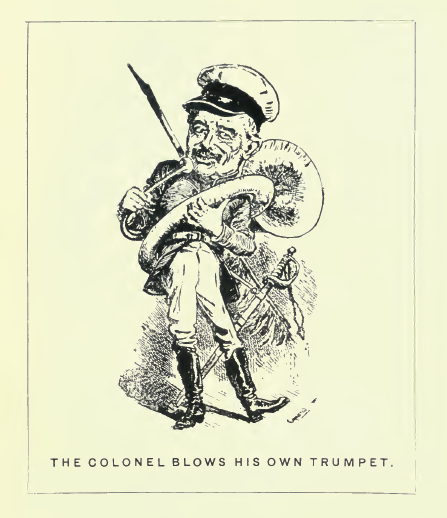
A caricature of Col. Schermbrucker from the Cape Lantern.

Frederick Schermbrucker (1832–1904) was a soldier and an influential parliamentarian of the Cape Colony. He was a strong pro-imperialist, one of the foremost supporters of Cecil Rhodes and an early leader of the Progressive Party of the Cape.

== Early life and business career ==
Born in Schweinfurth, Bavaria in 1832 as Friedrich Schermbruecker, he volunteered and fought in the Crimean War in his youth, as part of the German Legion, and earned distinction in the trenches of Sevastopol.

He moved to the Cape Colony in 1857, and settled in the Eastern Cape as a German teacher. During his time living in Kingwilliamstown he was accused and found guilty of shooting a Xhosa sheep rustler. The district nonetheless elected him to the Cape Parliament in 1868, where he soon gained a reputation as a clown and an eccentric. After his businesses failed and he fell into bankruptcy, he left the Cape and pursued a range of enterprises as far north as Matabeleland. He moved to Bloemfontein for several years where he edited the Bloemfontein Express with Carl Borckenhagen, but had to leave a few years later in the face of local riots who burnt him in effigy.

In total, the list of varied careers which he pursued included: teacher, interpreter, auctioneer, editor, army officer, cabinet minister, and company director among others.

== The Confederation Wars (1878-1880) ==
He returned to the Cape Colony in 1877 to lead a mixed force of German and African levies in the frontier war of 1878. He served with great aptitude and later led the Kaffrarian Riflemen in the Anglo-Zulu War. He commanded at Luneberg and distinguished himself at Pemvani River.

His relationship with the earlier Molteno Government of the Cape had been troubled. However, the new Prime Minister, John Gordon Sprigg shared Schermbrucker's strongly pro-imperialist views, and invited Schermbrucker to accompany him to Basutoland to enforce his discriminatory policy of disarming all peoples of African descent. This policy resulted in the Basuto Gun War, and when the Sprigg Government fell, Schermbrucker temporarily retired.

== Politics and later life ==
He was a member of the Legislative Council for the Eastern Cape, from 1882 until 1888, and once again for the House of Assembly from 1889 until his death. He served as Commissioner of Crown Lands for the Upington Ministry (1884-1886) and for Sprigg's second Ministry (1886-1890)

Colonel Schermbrucker was an avid imperialist, a strong admirer of Cecil Rhodes and Jameson, a fervid initiator of the Cape's Progressive party, and a skilled orator. He carried decorations from the Pope, the Gaika War, the disastrous Basuto Gun War and the Anglo-Zulu War. His political personality was a memorable mixture of clowning and combativeness. In his book, The Old Cape House, parliamentary clerk and writer Ralph Kilpin described Schermbrucker's amusing but very successful style of politics:

His wit was not nimble; his success in his new role lay rather in drollery and ponderous loquacity, which, combined with his knowledge of the rules of debate, made him at once a prince of obstructionists, the torment of Speakers and the idol of the gallery.

Schermbrucker married Lucy Egan, and had a large number of children. He died of dropsy in 1904.
