= Steuerverein =

Former German customs union

The Steuerverein (Tax Union) was formed in 1834 as a customs union first of the Duchy of Brunswick and the Kingdom of Hanover and then with the Grand Duchy of Oldenburg in 1836. Hanover joined the Deutscher Zollverein (German Customs Union) in 1854, after negotiating advantageous conditions with Prussia.

Facing isolation, Oldenburg followed suit in 1854, thus ending the Steuerverein.

== Beginnings ==
Steuerverein in the 1840s Orange: Steuerverein Blue: Zollverein Special arrangements in Minden area

Moves to a north German customs alliance occurred in 1830, when Hanover, the Electorate of Hesse, the Grand Duchy of Oldenburg and Brunswick concluded the Einbeck Treaty as a supplement to the Central German Commercial Union. This provided for tariff free trade between the contracting parties and a common customs administration and external tariff. Excluded from the regulation were the trade in salt (a state monopoly). Since the contracting parties could not reach an agreement on the amount of the external customs duties, the contract did not come into force. In addition, Electoral Hesse joined the Prussian-Hessian Customs Union instead.

A new attempt to forge a north German customs union was made and an agreement between Hanover and Brunswick came into force on 1 June 1835. The two states agreed a customs union with internal tariff free trade, a common external tariff and a common customs administration. The customs revenue was divided according to their respective populations. The external tariffs on materials imported from overseas and on finished goods were below the rates of the Deutscher Zollverein. Like the previous agreement, salt was excluded from internal tariff free trade.

== Relations with Zollverein ==
The Steuerverein did not arise from hostility to the Prussian customs unions, but rather from the requirements of a population upon which the higher duties of the Zollverein external tariff would have been injurious because of import duties on articles of consumption, especially colonial produce, of which Hanover was a large importer.

In 1837 a Convention between the Zollverein and Steuerverein was signed which greatly reduced Zollverein import duties on imports from the Steuerverein States, such as corn, hops, butter, leather, iron, glass, and earthenware; duties on linen and linen-yarn were entirely removed. In return, the Steuerverein took measures to suppress smuggling into the Zollverein, including adjustments of outlying territory to provide a more easily policed customs cordon. Parts of the Steuerverein member states did not belong to the Steuerverein territory. Provinces of Oldenburg situated in other parts of Germany, namely the Duchy of Birkenfeld and the Principality of Lübeck, were not included. Likewise some exclaves of Brunswick and Hanover. Many of these excluded areas were included in the Prussian customs administration. Conversely, some Prussian exclaves and the county Minden in Prussia were connected to the Steuerverein. The Principality of Schaumburg-Lippe joined in 1838.

The detached part of Electoral Hesse known as the County of Schaumburg (which bordered independent Schaumburg Lippe) remained outside of the Steuerverein. Negotiations took place between Hanover and Prussia, prior to the defection of Brunswick, but Electoral Hesse vetoed this prospect.

The Prussian government district of Minden formed a salient into the territory of the Steuerverein. By agreement with Hanover, Oldenburg and Brunswick, the Prussian government joined various parts of the district of Minden to the Steuerverein (1841). Due to the geographical location, the inhabitants of the neighbouring parts of the Steuerverein habitually used the town of Minden for the sale of their arable and livestock farming products. Prussia allowed this trade to continue duty free so that Minden could continue to benefit as a market centre for the region.

== Defection of Brunswick ==
Brunswick defected to the Zollverein in 1841, causing much bad feeling with Hanover. At the same time a treaty for the prolongation of the Steuerverein was contracted by Hanover, Oldenburg, and Schaumburg-Lippe. Brunswick insisted upon its outlying dependencies being included with the Zollverein, resulting in extensive smuggling along interlacing portions of Hanoverian and Brunswick territory. So the two unions agreed by treaty in 1845 that the Hartz and Weser districts of Brunswick were reincorporated in the Steuerverein. This treaty and six supplementary agreements facilitated trade across their mutual customs border.

== Tariff Regime ==
In 1846 Hanover reached a trade agreement making important tariff concessions to the United States of America. Oldenburg followed suit in 1847.

At this time Steuerverein production was mainly agricultural and largely exported, whilst the consumption of imports per capita was reckoned to be more than double that of the Zollverein. Accession to the Zollverein, under the external tariff then in force, would raise the import duties on articles of consumption, especially on Colonial produce, resulting in an increase in the cost of living, and thus also of production. For example, sugar duties in the Zollverein were 9 thalers per quintal (i.e. a hundredweight or 50 kg), but only 3 thalers in the Steuerverein. The Zollverein duty on wine was 48 thalers per hogshead (this Hanoverian measure being equal to 234 litres), while in the Steuerverein it was only 18 thalers. The same disparity existed between the duties on raw and manufactured iron. The Hanoverian and Prussian thaler (or dollar) was equivalent to 2s 10¾d sterling.

In 1850, Austria proposed an amalgamation of the three customs unions in Germany, that of the Austrian Empire, the Zollverein and the Steuerverein (the first two including territories beyond the German Confederation). However the tariff regimes of the three unions were quite different. The Austrian was hitherto a prohibitive tariff, whilst the Zollverein had a protective tariff and the Steuerverein a financial tariff (i.e. tax raising rather than protecting domestic industry). This scheme if realised would change the tariff of the Zollverein towards higher duties, rather than cause it to be assimilated to the lower tariff of the Steuerverein. Thus the proposal was received with little favour in the Steuerverein, especially the government and press of Hanover.

== End of the Steuerverein ==
However, Prussia decided to draw in the Steuerverein states into the Zollverein, even at the cost of large concessions, which might risk the defection of south German states from the Zollverein. Negotiations were held between Rudolf von Delbrück, Ministerial-Director of the Prussian Ministry of Commerce and Dr. Otto Klenze, General-Director for Indirect Taxes in the Hanoverian Interior Ministry. As both states wanted to avoid Austria frustrating their progress, this was kept secret. A treaty was soon agreed between Prussia and Hanover on 7 September 1851, by which Hanover joined the Zollverein on 1 January 1854.

Hanover negotiated most favourable terms. As well as her share of the Zollverein customs and tax revenues in proportion to her population, Hanover received an annual "praecipium", which was a bonus amounting to two-thirds of her entitlement to net receipts of the Zollverein. The initial estimate of the "praecipium" was 767,000 thalers (£115,000 sterling). This was to compensate for the loss of profits from the transit trade, and as a consideration for the greater consumption of taxed articles, such as foreign wines and colonial produce, compare with the Zollverein. Also, import duties on wine, coffee, molasses, tea, and brandy were reduced (by 50% in the case of brandy). Another concession was that British iron could be imported free of duty, for the completion of the Hanoverian railway lines, for a limited period.

Throughout Hanover, where the benefit of low tariffs were greatly valued, the accession to the Zollverein caused much dissatisfaction and a ministerial crisis. However, the treaty was ratified by the legislature in 1852.

This treaty was signed only by Prussia and Hanover. Prussia had not consulted any member of the Zollverein and Hanover had not consulted Oldenburg or Schaumburg-Lippe, who were both forced to follow Hanover into the Zollverein. By an agreement between Hanover and Schaumburg-Lippe on 25 September 1851, the latter adhered to the arrangements in the Prussia-Hanover treaty. Oldenburg acceded by means of a treaty with Hanover and Prussia (jointly) dated 1 March 1, 1852.

Both the Zollverein and Steuerverein treaties were due to expire in 1853, which provided the opportunity to negotiate new terms.
