= SMS Habicht =

There were three ships in the Prussian Navy and later German Imperial Navy or Austro-Hungarian Navy named SMS Habicht:

- SMS Habicht (1860) - a Jäger-class gunboat launched in 1860
- SMS Habicht (1879) - a Habicht-class gunboat launched in 1879
- SMS Habicht (1886), an Austro-Hungarian Schichau-class torpedo boat built in the 1880s
