= Karl Friedrich Nebenius =

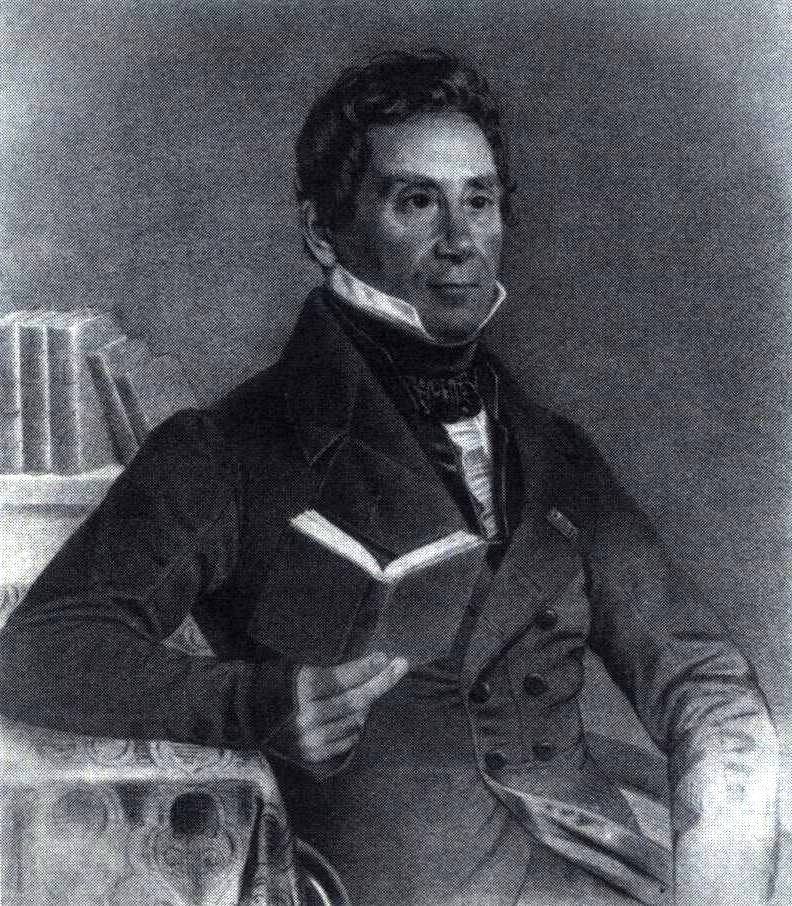
Karl Friedrich Nebenius

Karl Friedrich Nebenius (29 September 1784, Rhodt - 8 June 1857 in Karlsruhe) was a Baden minister and author of their 1818 constitution.

== Life ==
Nebenius was born on 29 September 1784 in Rhodt in the present-day state of Rhineland-Palatinate in Germany. After studying law at University of Tübingen, he held various posts in the Baden State civil service between 1807 and 1849.

He was the author of the Baden Constitution of 1818, wrote the Baden law on weights and measures in 1828 and reformed the education system in the Grand Duchy. In 1832 he also carried out a comprehensive reorganisation of Polytechnic in University of Karlsruhe. The improvement of the state's infrastructure was another field in which Nebenius worked. He drove the entry of Baden into the German Customs Union (Deutscher Zollverein) in 1836, the state-financed construction of the Baden railway from Mannheim to Basel and the construction of Mannheim Harbour.

In 1838 Nebenius became Minister for the Interior (Innenminister), but had to resign in October 1839 due to differences with the conservative foreign minister, Friedrich Landolin Karl Freiherr von Blittersdorf.

Nebenius was dismissed from state service as a result of the 1848/49 Baden Revolution. Thereafter he devoted himself to literary pursuits. He was a member of the Carl zur Eintracht masonic lodge in Mannheim. He died on 8 June 1857 in Karlsruhe.

== Works ==
- Denkschrift für den Beitritt Badens zu dem zwischen Preußen, Bayern, Württemberg, den beiden Hessen und mehreren andern deutschen Staaten abgeschlossenen Zollverein, Karlsruhe 1833
- Über die Natur und die Ursachen des öffentlichen Credits, Staatsanleihen, die Tilgung der öffentlichen Schulden, den Handel mit Staatspapieren und die Wechselwirkung zwischen den Creditoperationen der Staaten und dem oekonomischen und politischen Zustande der Länder. The 1st edition is a Rarissimum, the second edition appeared in 1829 at Marx in Karlsruhe.

== Sources ==
- Klaus-Peter Hoepke: Geschichte der Fridericiana. Stationen in der Geschichte der Universität Karlsruhe (TH) von der Gründung 1825 bis zum Jahr 2000, Karlsruhe 2007. Available from KIT Scientific Publishing (PDF; 9.2 MB)
