= Prussian-Hessian Customs Union =

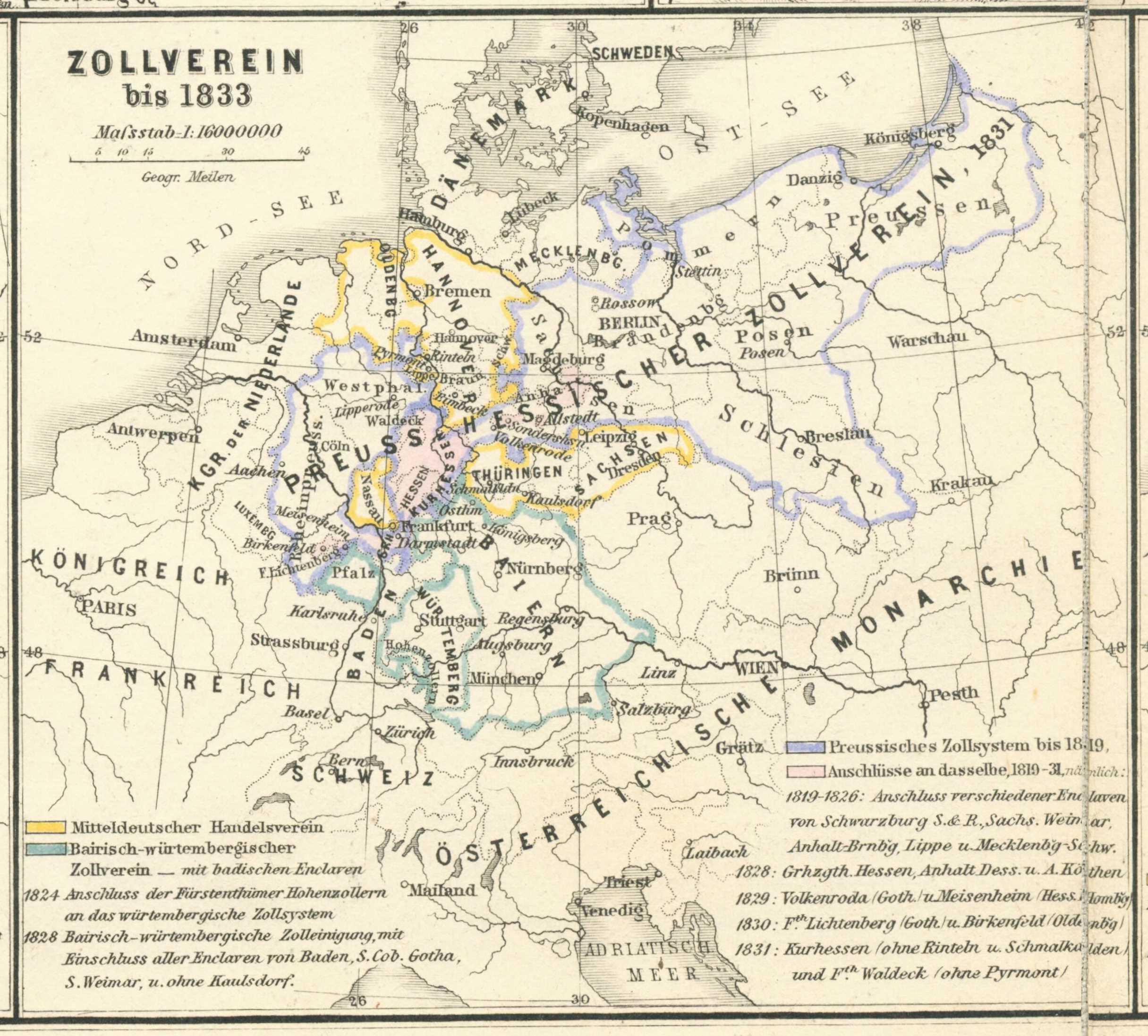
Prussian-Hessian Customs Union, map from 1872.

The Prussian-Hessian Customs Union (German: preußisch-hessische Zollverein) was a customs union between the Kingdom of Prussia and the Grand Duchy of Hesse that was established in 1828. Several other states joined over the following years, most notably the Electorate of Hesse. The union was an important stepping stone towards the creation of the German Custom Union, which replaced it in 1834, and thus a first economic step towards the unification of Germany.

== Establishment ==
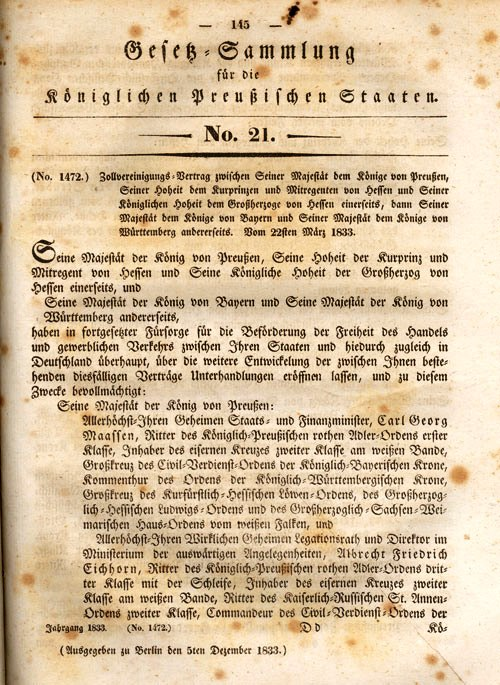
Prussian publication of the 22 March 1833 treaty which unified the Pussian-Hessian and South German Customs Unions.

After the end of the Napoleonic Wars, efforts began at various levels to remove toll and trade barriers within the new German Confederation. The main goal was to increase state revenues. In this context, Prussia began to create a unified customs area when it passed a new customs law in October 1818. With this law, the government began systematically encouraging smaller states in the area of Prussia to join the system. In this context, negotiations took place with various enclaves. On 25 October 1819, the first customs treaty resulting from these discussions was signed with Schwarzburg-Sondershausen. This was followed by treaties with Schwarzburg-Rudolstadt on 24 June 1822, with Saxe-Weimar-Eisenach regarding the regions of Allstedt and Oldisleben on 27 June 1823, with the Principality of Lippe regarding the regions of Lipperode, Cappel, and Grevenhagen in June 1826, and with Mecklenburg-Schwerin regarding Rossow, Netzband und Schönberg on 2 December 1826.

A key problem for Prussia was that it consisted of a western and an eastern portion after the Congress of Vienna, which were not connected. Therefore, Prussia sought to bring one of the large states between its two sections into the Prussian customs system, in order to unify the customs system of the whole Prussian Kingdom. One potential partner was the Grand Duchy of Hesse ("Hesse-Darmstadt"). From 1820 to 1823, Hesse-Darmstadt had engaged in negotiations regarding a South German Customs Union, which culminated in an attempt by Hesse Darmstadt, Hesse-Kassel, Nassau, and Baden to create their own customs union. However, despite a treaty between Baden and Hesse-Darmstadt in 1824, this union remained hypothetical. A meeting on a customs union between Bavaria, Württemberg, and Baden that was held in Stuttgart in 1825 also failed. Thus, on 14 February 1828, Hesse-Darmstadt finally conceded to join the Prussian system. In retrospect, this agreement was significant as Prussia's first extension of its influence south of the Mainlinie and because it created an economic bridge between the two parts of the Kingdom which had previously remained separate.

== Structure ==
Process of German economic unification.

The Prussian Finance minister Friedrich von Motz saw the union with Hesse-Darmstadt as only the first step in the creation of a wider customs union. The Prussian government therefore refrained from officially dominating Hesse-Darmstadt except in the case of small enclaves and accepted some disadvantages like a Hessian right to reject Prussian trade agreements which harmed Hessian interests. However, the union meant that Hesse-Darmstadt was absorbed into the Prussian customs administration and that the Hessian customs system was "organised identically to the Royal Prussian customs administration." All customs barriers between the two states were removed, with the exception of salt, playing cards, brandy, beer, vinegar, tobacco, and wine. Changes in customs rates had to be agreed by both countries. The revenues were split between Hesse-Darmstadt and the Prussian provinces of Rhineland and Westphalia based on population size.

As a result of the enclave treaties, Schwarzburg-Sondershausen and some smaller exclaves of other countries also belonged to the customs union. In July 1828, Anhalt-Dessau and Anhalt-Köthen joined the Prussian tax and toll system, thus bringing them into the customs union. In 1829 and 1830, other small areas joined (Meisenheim, Lichtenberg, and Principality of Birkenfeld). The admission of Hesse-Kassel in 1831 was very significant, because it greatly weakened the competing Central German Commercial Union. In 1832, most of Waldeck joined as well.

The treaty was in force until 31 December 1834. Through the mediation of Johann Friedrich Cotta and others, the Prussian-Hessian Customs Union and the South German Customs Union grew closer to one another. In 1829, the two unions unified, granting tax-free status to all local products. This paved the way for the creation of the German Customs Union in 1834.

== Bibliography ==
- Jürgen Angelow. Der Deutsche Bund. Wiss. Buchgesellschaft, Darmstadt 2003, ISBN 3-534-15152-6, pp. 62f.
- Wolfram Siemann. Vom Staatenbund zum Nationalstaat. Deutschland 1807–1871. Beck, München 1995, ISBN 3-406-30819-8, pp. 339
- von Weber, Wilhelm (1871). Der deutsche Zollverein. Geschichte seiner Entstehung und Entwicklung (2 ed.). Leipzig: Veit & Comp.
