= Zollverein =

Economic union of German states (1834–1919)

German Zollverein, 1834–1919: Prussia in 1834; Areas included until 1866; Austrian possessions outside the Zollverein; Borders of the 1828 German Confederation

The Zollverein (German: [ˈtsɔlfɛɐ̯ˌʔaɪn]), or German Customs Union, was a coalition of German states formed to manage tariffs and economic policies within their territories. Organized by the 1833 Zollverein treaties, it formally started on 1 January 1834. However, its foundations had been in development from 1818 with the creation of a variety of custom unions among the German states. By 1866, the Zollverein included most of the German states. The Zollverein was not part of the German Confederation (1815–1866).

The foundation of the Zollverein was the first instance in history in which independent states consummated a full economic union without the simultaneous creation of a political federation or union.

Prussia was the primary driver behind the creation of the customs union. Austria was excluded from the Zollverein because of its highly protectionist trade policy, its unwillingness to split its customs territory into the separate Austrian, Hungarian and Galician-Lodomerian ones, as well as Prince von Metternich's opposition to the idea. By the time of the North German Confederation's founding in 1867, the Zollverein included states whose area totaled approximately 425,000 square kilometres (164,000 sq mi), and it had produced economic agreements with several non-German states, including Sweden–Norway. After the founding of the German Empire in 1871, the Empire assumed the control of the customs union. However, not all states within the Empire were part of the Zollverein until 1888 (Hamburg for example). Conversely, though Luxembourg was a state independent of the German Empire, it remained in the Zollverein until 1919 when the Treaty of Versailles ended it.

== Background ==
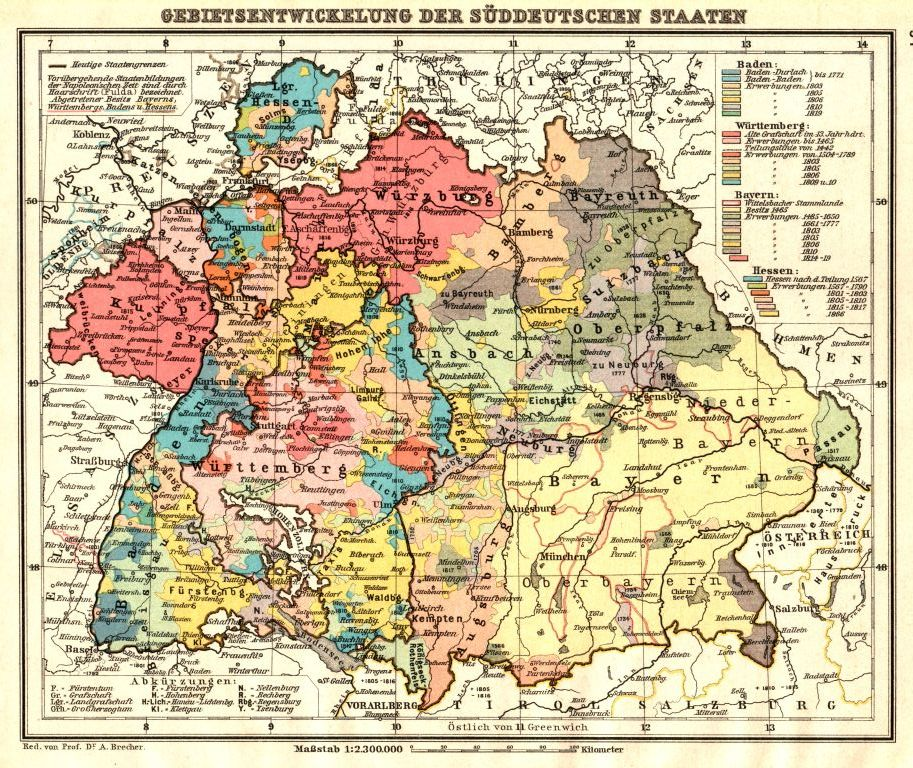
Map of the south German states and province of Hohenzollern. At the turn of the 19th century, this group of territories was transformed into three larger powers: Baden, Württemberg and Bavaria. (The territories which became the Grand Duchy of Hesse are also shown.)

The splintering of territory and states over generations meant that by the 1790s, in the mostly German-speaking Holy Roman Empire in Central Europe, there were approximately 1800 customs barriers. Even within the Prussian state itself, there were, at the beginning of the 19th century, more than 67 local customs and tariffs, with as many customs borders. To travel from Königsberg in East Prussia to Cologne, for example, a shipment was inspected and taxed about 80 times. Each customs inspection at each border slowed the shipment's progress from source to destination, and each assessment on the shipment reduced profit and increased the price of goods, dramatically stifling trade.

When France defeated the Second Coalition, made up of Russian, Austrian and German forces, and annexed territories up to the Rhine, there was a general consolidation of the myriad of tiny states in Germany in the Mediatization of 1803. This was also called the Principal Conclusion of the Extraordinary Imperial Delegation (or, in German, Hauptschluss der außerordentlichen Reichsdeputation, usually called the Reichsdeputationshauptschluss). This last piece of major legislation enacted by the Holy Roman Empire re-arranged the map of Central Europe, especially in the southwestern territories. The Reichshauptschluss resulted in the secularization of many ecclesiastical territories, and the so-called mediatization, i.e. the annexation to larger neighboring territories, of many of the formerly free imperial territories, including most of the imperial cities. Considerable portions of the Habsburg family territories in southwestern Central Europe were "mediatized", or given as compensation, to the princes and dukes who had lost territories in the French expansion. Most of the imperial cities, imperial abbeys, and ecclesiastical states and cities were mediatized or secularized in 1803. With the final dissolution of the Holy Roman Empire in 1806, most of the remaining tiny principalities were annexed by larger neighbors.

Historians have analyzed three Prussian goals in the development of the Zollverein: first, as a political tool to eliminate Austrian influence in Germany; second, as a way to improve the economies; and third, to strengthen Germany against potential French aggression while reducing the economic independence of smaller states. The Zollverein created a larger market for German-made farm and handicraft products and promoted commercial unification under fiscally sound economic parameters. While the Union sought to limit trade and commercial barriers between and among member states, it continued to uphold the protectionist barriers against outsiders.

According to economic historian Florian Ploeckl, the commonly accepted view among economic historians is that Prussia was motivated to create Zollverein in order to achieve economies of scale in customs administration, thus leading to substantial fiscal savings.

== Initial efforts at a single-toll system ==
During the Napoleonic Era, efforts in the Rhineland toward economic unity had mixed success. The Confederation of the Rhine, and the other satellite creations of Napoleonic France, sought to establish autarky in European trade. By 1806, as Napoleon I sought to secure his hegemony in Europe, the Continental System offered a semblance of unified effort toward a widespread domestic market for European goods. However, the main purpose of the Continental System was military, not economic. Napoleon wanted a trade embargo against Britain, through which he hoped to wreck the British economy. The combination of war and isolation from Britain's trading system destroyed markets for external raw materials and for manufactured goods, resulting in the near ruin of the Central European economy. Especially hard hit were the trading economies of the Lowlands and Rhineland states, which had relied heavily upon imports of raw materials from throughout the world, and on the export of finished products. The domestic markets in Central Europe were not large enough to sustain consumption of their own production. These problems were dramatically exacerbated by the numerous excise taxes and tolls which were the main source of state income. Reduction in trade meant the near bankruptcy of the smaller states.

At the Congress of Vienna in 1814 and 1815, diplomats – principally those from the Great Powers – confirmed the remapping of Europe, and broadly, the rest of the world, into spheres of influence. Central Europe, or German-speaking Europe, remained largely within the influence of the Austrian Habsburgs, balanced at the periphery by the Russian empire in the east, and the French in the west. Prussia was expected to play some role in these spheres of influence, but the ambiguities of the Austrian and Prussian relationship were unresolved. The German states retained autonomy; however, the old imperial institution of the Reichstag was converted to the form of a Confederation Diet, to meet in Frankfurt. The Habsburg archdukes, now Emperors of Austria, were to serve as permanent presidents of this institution. Isolated voices, such as Joseph Görres and Freiherr vom Stein, called for the abolition of domestic tolls and the creation of a German tariff on imports. The mandate from the Vienna Congress, however, established the German Confederation, but did not deal with the economic circumstances, nor did it make any effort to achieve economic and trade standardization. Instead, the articles that established the Confederation suggested that trade and transportation questions be discussed at a later date.

=== Problems with unifying the customs and toll agreements ===
Prussia and the central and southwestern states of Hesse-Kassel and Hesse-Darmstadt, Württemberg, Baden, and Bavaria were leaders in the modernization of the toll system within the German states. In the Prussian case, the experience of the Confederation of the Rhine in removing customs barriers offered an example of how it could be done, and Hans, Count von Bülow, who until 1811 had been the Finance Minister in Westphalia, and who had accepted this position in 1813 in Prussia, modeled the Prussian customs statutes on those of the former states of the Confederation. The addition of territory to the existing Prussian state made elimination of customs barriers a powerful factor in Prussian politics. The significant differences between "old" Prussia and the newly acquired territories complicated the debate. The "newer" Prussian provinces in the Rhineland and Westphalia, with their developing manufacturing sectors, contended with the heavily agricultural territories of "old" Prussia. The dissimilarities in the two sides of Prussia confirmed regional perceptions for the need for their own political and administrative units, which became an important element of the customs debate. Within "old" Prussia itself, the customs statutes from 1818 reduced domestic customs barriers. After 1818, goods coming into Prussia and leaving Prussia were charged a high tariff. Goods moved freely within the state itself. The Prussian toll was therefore very simple and efficient. Manufactured goods were heavily taxed, especially textiles, and the most important taxes were for food, necessities and luxury goods.

Similarly, in the southwest German states, it became urgent to integrate the newly acquired territories into the states' existing economic systems. The territorial growth of the southwestern middle-sized states, in particular the two Hessian principalities, but also the growth of Baden and Württemberg, had split the territorial continuity of Prussia; the Prussian state was no longer linked entirely by territory, but rather was separated from many of its newer acquisitions by territories newly acquired by other states. These states often saw their own interests as conflicting generally and specifically with Prussian expansionism, and resented Prussian dominance and authority. Furthermore, these newly expanded states, usually referred as "middle-sized states" (or, in German, Mittelstaaten), faced problems in integrating their newly acquired territories and populations into an existing political, economic and legal structure.

These problems were exacerbated by European wide economic woes following the Napoleonic Wars. Unemployment and high prices, especially for foodstuffs, characterized an economy not yet converted back to peacetime needs. The problem in Britain was particularly severe and the British response created a ripple effect that worsened problems in the German states: In trying to manage the post-war economy, the British government was caught between the Malthusian understanding of the relationship of wages, prices, and population, and the Ricardian model. On the one hand, adherents to the Malthusian model believed it was dangerous for Britain to rely on imported corn, because lower prices would reduce wages, and landlords and farmers would lose purchasing power. On the other hand, adherents to the Ricardian model thought that Britain could use its capital and population to advantage in a system of free trade. The problems in Britain established precedent for problems in the German states; the British limitation on grain imports, through the Corn Laws, blocked economic recovery in the German states, particularly in eastern Prussia, by limiting the amount of grain that could be imported into Britain. Not only did the Corn Laws keep the price of grain in Britain high, they undermined the viability of Junker producers in east Prussia, and limited their access to external markets.

The commercial reform efforts sponsored by Bavaria in 1856 led to the General German Commercial Code in 1861 that was quickly approved by a majority of the confederation. It proved highly successful in reducing barriers and increasing trade.

== 1820s and 1830s ==
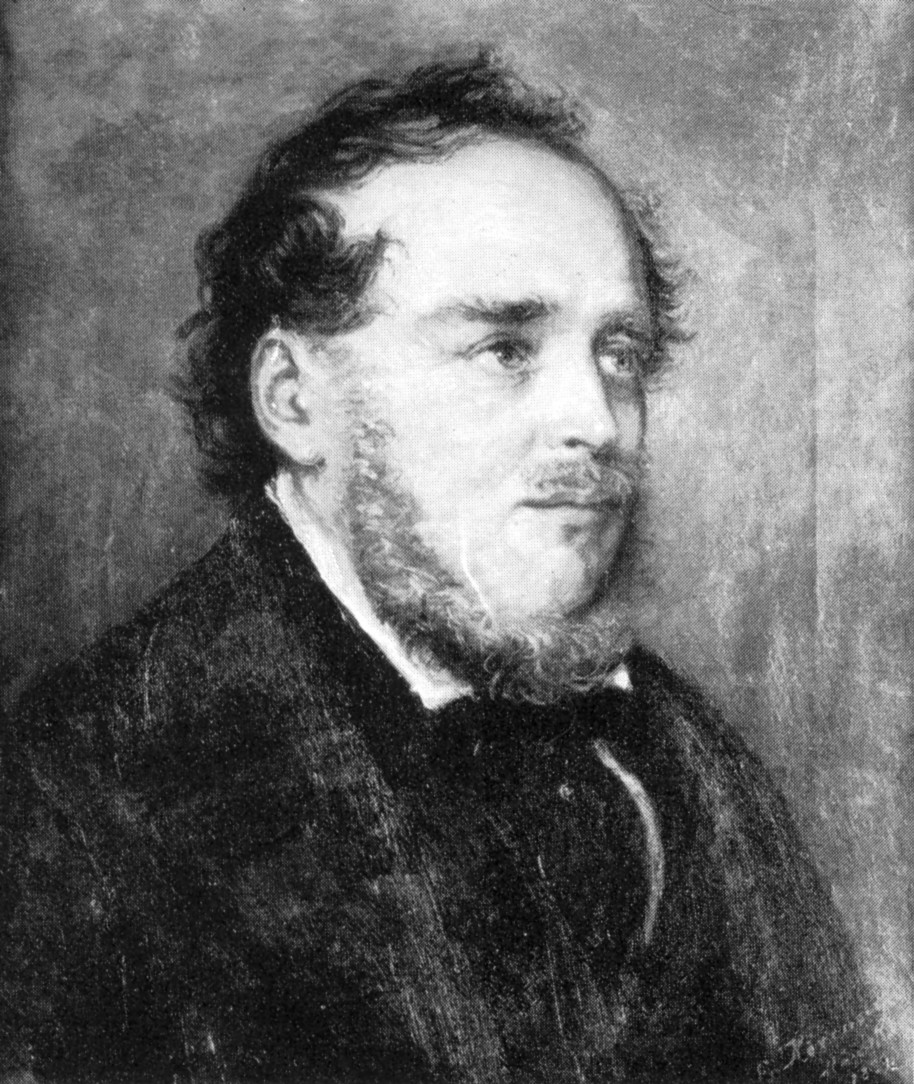
Friedrich List, economist (1839 oil painting by Caroline Hövemeyer at the Heimatmuseum Reutlingen)

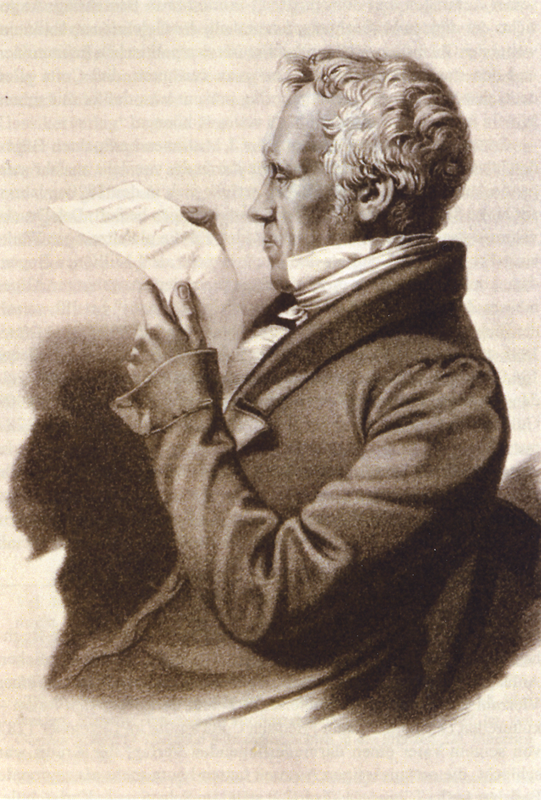
1803s lithograph of Johann F. Cotta. Cotta played an important role in the development of the south German customs agreement and also negotiated the Prussian Hessian Customs agreements.

The Zollverein and German unification

At the close of the Napoleonic Wars, Germany was made up of 39 states, among them four city-states. Having abolished its own internal tariffs in 1818, Prussia began inviting individual states to eliminate tariffs, with the agreements setting the foundation for Zollverein cementing strong economic ties between the various Prussian and Hohenzollern territories, and ensuring economic contact between non-contiguous holdings of the Hohenzollern family, also the ruling family of Prussia. It was formed to remove the various obstacles (such as different weights and measures in German states) to economic exchange and growth by the new commercial classes, creating a national unity in economic matter at a time when Germany was divided.

Surmounting the domestic customs, and the individual states' dependence on those customs as their primary source of income, proved to be a difficult problem. The myriad of customs barriers restricted trade and hampered the industrial development, but the rulers of the states were reluctant to forgo their income from the customs. The impasse was overcome through external forces. With the repeal of the Continental System, the German tradesmen stood in direct conflict with the English industry. A united German Trade and Tradesmens Union demanded protection from English exports. Their spokesman, the economist Friedrich List, feared that the German people would end up as "drawers of water and hewers of wood for Britain". Similarly, Karl Friedrich Nebenius, later president of the Ducal Ministry in the Grand Duchy of Baden and the author of Baden's 1819 proposed customs initiative with the German Confederation, offered a widely publicized description about the difficulties of surmounting such protections:

The 38 toll barriers in Germany cripple domestic traffic and bring more or less the same results: how if every limb of the human body were bound together, so that blood could not flow from one limb to the other? In order to trade from Hamburg to Austria, from Berlin to the Swiss Cantons, one must cut through the statutes of ten states, study ten tolls and toll barriers, ten times go through the toll barriers, and ten times pay the tolls. Who but the unfortunate has to negotiate such borders? To live with such borders? Where three or four states collide, there one must live his whole life under evil, senseless tolls and toll restrictions. That is no Fatherland!

In 1820, Württemberg planned to start a customs union among the so-called Third Germany: the middle-sized German states, including itself, Baden, Bavaria, and the two Hessian states (Hesse-Darmstadt and Hesse-Kassel). This customs union excluded both Austria and Prussia, primarily because the two major German powers were considered too overbearing. Plans foundered on the differing interests of the affected states. While the economic development in Baden proceeded relatively well, with its long borders and well entrenched infrastructure for trade, economic development in Bavaria lagged well behind it, and the Bavarian regime enacted a protective tariff on goods produced outside its border. The result was a short lived trade agreement between Baden and Hesse-Darmstadt. Nevertheless, a second agreement, reached in Stuttgart in 1825, established rapport between Württemberg and Bavaria, with the foundation of the South German Customs Union. In opposition to the Prussian activities, Hanover, Saxony, Hesse, and other states (Austria, France, the United Kingdom, and the Netherlands), developed their own economic agreements. While they promised one another not to join the Prussian union, they did develop trade agreements of their own. The Union remained unsuccessful, because it only sought to maintain the status quo, not to fix the problems created by toll barriers.

In 1834, Baden and Württemberg joined the Prussian union, which was renamed the German Customs Union. The Tax Union or Steuerverein was formed in 1834 as a customs union first of the Duchy of Brunswick and the Kingdom of Hanover, then with the Grand Duchy of Oldenburg in 1836. By 1835, the German Customs Union had expanded to include the majority of the states of the German Confederation, even Saxony, the Thuringian states, Württemberg and Baden, Bavaria, and the Hessian states. Functionally, it removed many internal customs barriers, while upholding a protectionist tariff system with foreign trade partners.

== Timeline ==
| Date | Event(s) |
|---|---|
| 1815 | Establishment of the German Confederation leaves the question of economic and customs authority to future negotiation. |
| 1818 | 26 May: Prussia establishes an internal customs union throughout its state and Hohenzollern territories in southwestern Germany. |
| 1819 | Baden proposes a customs union organized through the German Confederation. The proposal fails at the Frankfurt Diet. 25 October: Schwarzburg-Sondershausen joins the Prussian customs system. |
| 1821 | Duchy of Anhalt joins the Prussian customs system. |
| 1826 | Mecklenburg-Schwerin joins the Prussian Customs Union. |
| 1828 | 18 January: By treaty, Bavaria and Württemberg form the South German Customs Union (SGCU). 14 February: By treaty, Prussia and the Grand Duchy of Hesse (Hesse-Darmstadt) form the Prussian-Hessian Customs Union (PHCU). The states that previously joined the Prussian customs system are included. 24 September: By the Treaty of Kassel, the Central German Commercial Union (CGCU) is formed by central and northern German states (Saxony, Hanover, Hesse-Kassel, Saxe-Weimar, Saxe-Altenburg, Saxe-Coburg, Nassau, Schwarzburg-Rudolstadt, Frankfurt, Saxe-Meiningen, Brunswick, Schwarzburg-Sondershausen, Reuss-Greiz, Reuss-Gera, Bremen, Oldenburg, and Hesse-Homburg). |
| 1829 | 27 May: Commercial alliance between the SGCU and PHCU is formed. |
| 1831 | Hesse-Kassel and Saxony join the PHCU; Königsberg (an exclave of Saxe-Coburg and Gotha) and Ostheim (an exclave of Saxe-Weimar-Eisenach) join the SGCU. |
| 1833 | Some of the states of the CGCU form the Customs and Commercial Union of the Thuringian States (CCUTS). |
| 1833 | March–May: Zollverein treaties are negotiated and concluded; the treaties act to merge SGCU, PHCU, and CCUTS into a unified customs union. |
| 1834 | 1 January: Zollverein treaties enter into force; the Zollverein comes formally into existence. A German census is introduced to facilitate revenue-sharing. |
| 1835 | Hesse-Homburg (20 February), Baden (12 May) and Nassau (10 December) join the Zollverein. |
| 1836 | 2 January: Frankfurt joins the Zollverein. |
| 1838 | 30 July: Dresden Coinage Convention is agreed to in order to standardise currency conversion within the Zollverein. |
| 1840–47 | Potato blight throughout the southwestern states, Saxony and parts of Prussia. |
| 1841 | Brunswick joins the Zollverein. |
| 1842 | Luxembourg joins the Zollverein. |
| 1848–49 | 1848 Revolutions. Propositions are made for a political and economic union. The Kleindeutschland ("Lesser Germany") solution for political unification is proposed. |
| 1851 | 7 September: Hanover joins the Zollverein. |
| 1852 | 1 March: Oldenburg joins the Zollverein. |
| 1857 | 24 January: Vienna Monetary Treaty is concluded between the Zollverein states, Austria and Liechtenstein to standardise currencies. |
| 1864 | Prussia and Austria engage in a border war with Denmark over the autonomy of the duchies of Holstein and Schleswig. |
| 1865 | Sweden–Norway signs a free trade agreement with the Zollverein, linking the German members to the Scandinavian market. |
| 1866 | Austro-Prussian War, in which Austria is forced to dissolve the German Confederation and is excluded from its successor, the Prussian-led North German Confederation. At the same time, the original East Prussian cradle of the Prussian statehood as well as Prussian-held Polish- or Kashubian-speaking territories of Province of Posen, West Prussia and the Lauenburg and Bütow Land are formally incorporated into the confederation. |
| 1867 | The Zollverein is reconstituted with its territory enlarged by East Prussia, the Lauenburg and Bütow Land, West Prussia and the Province of Posen |
| 1868 | Schleswig-Holstein, Saxe-Lauenburg and Mecklenburg-Strelitz join the Zollverein. |
| 1871 | Following the Franco-Prussian War, Alsace-Lorraine joins the Zollverein. The German Empire is formed. |
| 1888 | The Hanseatic city-states of Hamburg, Lübeck and Bremen join the customs union, seventeen years after political unification. |
| 1919 | The German Empire is replaced by the Weimar Republic. Luxembourg leaves the Zollverein. |

The original customs union was not ended in 1866 with outbreak of the Austro-Prussian War, but a substantial reorganization emerged in 1867. The new Zollverein was stronger, in that no individual state had a veto. When eventually Hamburg acceded to the Customs Union in 1888 it negotiated the exemption of an area of 4 square miles at the centre of its port, which remained outside of the Zollverein. Bremen (which includes Bremerhaven) had a similar agreement.

== Impact ==
=== Economic impact ===
According to one study, "The Zollverein was the most important institutional development for Germany's economic unification during the middle of the 19th century. It had a strong impact on regional development, changing regional fortunes by the opening and closing of markets."

=== Role in the unification of Germany ===
According to economic historians Helmut Böhme and H.-U. Wehler, the Zollverein set the groundwork for the unification of Germany under Prussian guidance. This traditional view is disputed by historians such as Hans-Joachim Voth who contend that far from allowing Prussia to increase its political influence over the smaller states, the customs union may have had the contrary effect: many governments used the increased revenue brought by the customs union to try to consolidate their independence. The smaller states entered the customs union for purely fiscal reasons, and as the events of 1866 were to demonstrate, membership in the Zollverein did not in the least lead to any form of political commitment toward Berlin, as many states remained suspicious of Prussia and generally pro-Austrian.

The impact of the Zollverein on German unification may have been more incidental because it never intended to be a political platform but focused on the economy. As it constituted the main feature of Berlin's "German policy" for many years, Prussian ministers and other government officials became accustomed to think in terms of Germany as a whole and to look beyond specifically Prussian benefits when looking for a consensus across Germany.

According to revisionist historians, the Zollverein may not even have been instrumental in bringing about Prussia's economic preeminence in Germany. They argue that nothing seems to indicate that industrial investments increased decisively during the period in Prussia, or that the customs union played a significant role in reducing the dominance of agriculture in the kingdom's economy.

=== In literature ===
In 1840 the poet August Heinrich Hoffmann von Fallersleben published, in his Unpolitische Lieder, a song entitled Der deutsche Zollverein which ironically compares the economic advantages of a customs union to the political unity which the German Confederation had failed to achieve.
