= Carl Borckenhagen =

Journalist-cum-Politician

Carl (Karl) Ludwig Ferdinand Borckenhagen (21 February 1852 – 5 February 1898) was an influential journalist and political leader of the Orange Free State, and a founder of the Afrikaner Bond.

He was for a period one of the most powerful men in southern Africa, however the Dictionary of National Biography adds: "It is almost impossible to define the precise extent of his influence and political significance since, while seeing to it that others, in public posts, carried out his ideas, he himself kept in the background."

== Early life ==
Borckenhagen was born on 21 February 1852 in the Rodenbeck subdistrict of Minden, Westphalia, Germany, the son of Johann Ludwig Friedrich Borckenhagen (1818–1870), a Prussian officer who originally came from Königsberg and fell as a Oberstleutnant in the Franco-Prussian War at the Battle of Amiens, and his wife Julie Emilie Helene Seydel (1820–1888), from Minden. His older brother was Ludwig Borckenhagen of naval fame. His younger brothers, Albert Ludwig Emil Hans Borckenhagen (1855–1900) and Friedrich Borckenhagen (1857–1921), also joined the military, the latter becoming a General in the Prussian Artillery.

Carl Borckenhagen was schooled in the nearby town of Koblenz, where his health began to deteriorate from severe exposure to nighttime mid-winter temperatures, when he spent a period there without shelter. Soon after completing his studies, he met a British lady from the Channel Islands, named May Dorothy Blackmore (1853–1923), who at the time was on holiday in Germany, and they got engaged. She had grown up in Cape Town (her father had been a naval officer at the castle there) so, because of Borckenhagen's poor health, they decided to emigrate there.

Borckenhagen arrived in the Cape Colony in 1873. The country was undergoing a vast economic boom, but as Borckenhagen's health continued to deteriorate, he swiftly decided to leave the humid Cape, and head inland to the dryer Orange Free State – a long and laborious journey by ox-wagon. As his health immediately recovered, Borckenhagen began work at the business of Emanuel Fichardt at the Berlin Mission near Edenburg. The couple married in Bloemfontein on 10 February 1875, and had eight children – four daughters and four sons (two of whom died in childhood).

== Journalism ==
They moved to Bloemfontein in 1875, where Borckenhagen began work as a bookkeeper, then as an ambitious young journalist, and swiftly rose to a position of extreme influence in the republic. After working for a while on a publication, De Boerenvriend Huisalmanak, he became the founder and editor of its successor, the Free State Express ("De Express") newspaper, in 1877. He also acquired the printing press of Frederick Schermbrucker (an incendiary and deeply unpopular politician who was burned in effigy as he left) and built the business into the biggest media source in the republic.

As an aside to his increasing political work, he continued to run that powerful publication for the remainder of his life. De Express reached such a vast circulation, that Borckenhagen was able to formulate and influence the moods, desires and direction of the country's overall population. In fact, his leading articles correlate strongly with national laws passed; in each case with the statute closely following Borckenhagen's article. These led to the implementation of Borckenhagen's suggestions for compulsory education, scientific farming techniques, farming colleges and infrastructure such as roads, railways, bridges, mail and telegraph services.

The motto of De Express was "You have obtained your independence; maintain it, and make yourself worthy of it".

== Political career ==
Map of the southern African states in the late 1800s

=== Ideology and influence ===
Borckenhagen propounded strong anti-imperialist views, and as a republican, consistently fought for a united and independent South Africa. He was outraged by the extravagant imperial conquests of Governor Sir Henry Bartle Frere, which involved the annexation of the Transvaal. During the First Anglo-Boer war, he used his influence and resources to ensure that the Transvaal Republic remained connected to the outside world in spite of British attempts to cut off lines of communication.

For the Orange Free State, the long moderate rule of President Brand had meant close ties with the British Empire and with the Cape Colony to the south. However, as Borckenhagen rose to power, his influence pushed the Free State to align increasingly with its fellow republic of the Transvaal to the north. The next two Presidents, Francis William Reitz and Martinus Theunis Steyn, were both protégés of Borckenhagen, who assisted them to come to power and remained their mentor to some degree, even after they assumed office. Borckenhagen was therefore seen as a "maker of Presidents" and even acquired the nicknames of "Mynheer de President" and "President van die Vrystaat", as he was acknowledged to be the "power behind the throne" of the Presidency.

Borckenhagen came to have a massive influence over many other leaders across southern Africa, and excelled at influencing politicians with persuasive argument. A fellow editor later wrote of him: "...He became one of the most prominent figures in South African affairs, a valued councillor at Bloemfontein and Pretoria whenever affairs were critical, his advice ever tending towards peace and conciliation."

=== Afrikaner Bond ===
Under his direction, Reitz and other leaders joined him in founding the Afrikaner Bond in 1881, as a political organisation for all those who, regardless of ancestry, considered Africa to be their home rather than Europe. On 7 April 1881 he wrote the constitution of the new Bond, and published its manifesto in the Express, declaring it to be for "the States of South Africa to be federated in one independent republic", independent from the British Empire.

As a first step to this goal, he favoured a union between the two Afrikaner republics, as a bulwark against British imperial expansion. To this effect he took the position of Secretary of the Commission from Orange Free State Volksraad, to the Transvaal Republic, in May 1887, and led the discussions on this question. Borckenhagen facilitated the meeting of President Reitz with President Kruger of the Transvaal, at Potchefstroom. This resulted in the conclusion of a railway convention (8 March 1889), strategic alliance and trade agreements between the two republics.

=== Opposition to Cecil Rhodes ===
With the rise to power of Cecil Rhodes, Borckenhagen quickly became aware of the pivotal importance of this arch-imperialist in the future of southern Africa. Making an estimation of the level of Rhodes's personal ambition and keen to neutralise an impending wave of imperialism, Borckenhagen met Rhodes and attempted to divert him to the republican cause, using the temptation of power. Having successfully influenced Rhodes to desire a united South Africa by offering him its leadership, he finally failed to persuade Rhodes to support complete independence for South Africa. He famously confronted Rhodes in Cape Town, in an oft-quoted interview, of which several conflicting versions exist. Borckenhagen reportedly accused Rhodes of "crass materialism", a reverence for money, and the intention of forcefully bringing the republics into the British Empire. Rhodes reported that, in response to Borckenhagen's insistence that any union of South Africa would need to be independent, he had replied: "No, you take me either for a rogue or a fool. I would be a rogue to forget all my history and traditions; and I would be a fool, because I would be hated by my own countrymen and mistrusted by yours."

Failing to influence Rhodes, as he had so many politicians in the past, Borckenhagen moved to stand squarely in opposition to him. He gained considerable following in the ensuing years as he was perceived as the only Free Stater capable of foreseeing and combating Rhodes's plans. As stated in "Lord Milner and South Africa", "The Express (Mr. Borckenbagen's paper) has of late been the only paper in South Africa that has been able to hold its own against the Rhodesian flood. This was owing to Mr. Borckenhagen's intelligence and independence."

=== Transvaal in the lead-up to war ===
Borckenhagen often made private trips to the Transvaal, where he served as a type of unofficial ambassador. As such he was able to influence the country on matters such as its judicial crisis in 1897.

Although he was supportive of the Transvaal and its government under Paul Kruger, he also did not hesitate to tell Kruger off, on what he considered to be policy mistakes. He harshly and frequently criticised Kruger's government on its financial mismanagement and inefficiency.

In 1886, he famously wrote of how the Transvaal was not ready for the discovery of gold and the massive influx of prospecting "uitlanders" which resulted. He concluded that Pretoria had not had time to prepare itself and that gold had been discovered 50 years too early.

After the Jameson Raid in 1896, Borckenhagen met Kruger and told him to return Jameson for trial in the Cape, a decision that Kruger did carry out.

== Later life and legacy ==
Borckenhagen remained a leader of the Bond until his death in 1898 in Bloemfontein. His strategies and ideas continued to exercise a huge influence on republican politicians throughout southern Africa, such as du Toit of the Genootskap van Regte Afrikaners in the Cape Colony. However, it was in the Orange Free State that his influence was strongest; as related by Basil Worsfold: "(Borckenhagen) was probably the most consistent of all the South African exponents of the nationalist creed. Certainly it is no exaggeration to say that he converted the Free State of Brand into the Free State of Steyn."

In person, Borckenhagen was tall and slender; friendly and affable but also keen-eyed and enterprising. He had a vast general knowledge, and a notorious will-power in the pursuit of his ideals. In his private time he built up a large trading company, and a farming estate which he named Rodenbeck, after his birthplace, and which was situated just outside Bloemfontein (now within the city limits). He was Director of the Nationale Bank, a curator of Grey College, founder of the Nationale Exploratie Maatschappij, a City Councillor, Director of the City's Board of Executors, member of the first Lutheran consistory in the city, and president of both the Southern Cross Cycling Club and the Free State's Football Association. When he suddenly died in 1898, he was laid to rest in President Brand Cemetery, Bloemfontein. He was survived by his wife, Mary Dorothea Blackmore, and his seven children. His paper was taken over by his widow, before it was captured and shut down by the British during the Second Boer War.

After his death, while southern Africa briefly underwent a wave of war and imperial expansion, Borckenhagen's core principles, regarding allegiance to Africa over Europe, republicanism and a rejection of imperial interference, endured and eventually became central to South Africa's political direction, up until the present day.
