= Jenny Schreiner =

South African politician and civil servant (born 1956)

Member of the National Assembly
- In office 9 May 1994 – 1997

Personal details
- Born: Jennifer Ann Schreiner; 1956 (age 69–70) Johannesburg, Transvaal; Union of South Africa
- Party: African National Congress
- Other political affiliations: South African Communist Party
- Relations: Oliver Schreiner (grandfather)
- Parent(s): Deneys and Else Schreiner
- Education: Epworth School
- Alma mater: University of Natal; University of Cape Town; University of Pretoria

Jennifer Ann Schreiner (born 1956) is a retired South African politician, activist, and civil servant who represented the African National Congress (ANC) in the National Assembly from 1994 to 1997. She has been a member of the Central Committee of the South African Communist Party (SACP) since 1991 and formerly headed the party's secretariat.

Schreiner joined the ANC and its armed wing, Umkhonto we Sizwe, while a student in Cape Town. She rose to national prominence in September 1987 when she was arrested and charged with terrorism alongside Tony Yengeni and 12 others. She was released in 1991 following a protracted detention and later the same year was elected to the SACP Central Committee for the first time. She served in the first democratic Parliament from 1994 to 1997, chairing the Constitutional Assembly's subcommittee on security services, and later served in the senior civil service for two decades from 1997 until her retirement in 2017. Her civil service career included stints in the National Intelligence Coordinating Committee, as Chief Deputy Commissioner for Correctional Services, and as director-general for the Department of Economic Development and Department of Women. She was elected to her eighth consecutive term on the SACP Central Committee in 2022.

== Early life and family ==
Schreiner was born in 1956 in Johannesburg in the former Transvaal, the third of four children born to Else and Deneys Schreiner. Her father, later an academic at the University of Natal, was a member of the white liberal Schreiner family: her grandfather was Oliver Schreiner, a progressive appellate judge, and her great-grandfather was William Schreiner, a former prime minister of the Cape Colony and the brother of writer Olive Schreiner. Her mother was a founding member of the Liberal Party and of the Black Sash, and in the 1980s was president of the National Council of Women. Schreiner's younger sister, Barbara, also became a civil servant in the post-apartheid government and was an adviser to Minister Kader Asmal.

Schreiner grew up in Pietermaritzburg in Natal Province, where she attended the Epworth School. She began university at the University of Natal in 1974, studying the sciences, and in 1977 moved to the University of Cape Town (UCT) to study social science. She completed a master's in sociology at UCT in 1987, with a thesis about the political organisation of women in the Food and Canning Workers' Union. She was a doctoral student at UCT when she was arrested in 1987, and she later completed a master's in security studies at the University of Pretoria.

== Anti-apartheid activism ==
While at university in Natal, Schreiner was active in the National Union of South African Students and its Wages Commission, as well as in the student representative council. In Cape Town in 1979, she was recruited into the underground of the African National Congress (ANC), then banned inside South Africa, and went on to join the South African Communist Party (SACP) and Umkhonto we Sizwe (MK), the ANC's armed wing. She was a founding member of the United Women's Organisation of the Western Cape in 1981.

=== Rainbow trial: 1987–1991 ===
On 16 September 1987, the Security Branch raided Schreiner's flat in Marie Court in Wynberg, Cape Town. She and several other Cape Town activists were detained indefinitely, often in solitary confinement, under Section 29 of the Internal Security Act, and Law and Order Minister Adriaan Vlok told the press that they had uncovered the entire command structure of "an ANC terrorist network", calling it "the biggest-ever breakthrough against suburban terrorism in South Africa"; he also said that Schreiner was suspected of having planted a bomb in the Cape Town International Airport in July 1986. After a suicide attempt by Schreiner, she and the others were moved to Cape Town's Pollsmoor Prison in February 1988. While there, they mounted a hunger strike which received public attention, demanding improvements in detention conditions, including that they – the defendants – should not be held in racially segregated facilities.

At this stage, what I want to say to you is this – never in my life have I done anything in an ill-considered and adventurous way – and this is thanks to you and the way I was brought up to act responsibly and to take life seriously. The reality of our land is a harsh one and so harsh decisions have to be taken. You brought me up to act on my beliefs and to oppose injustice, and this has been my guide throughout. I am aware that the paths of action that each of you and I would choose would differ in a variety of ways, and some of you are in for a big surprise. My experience over the last couple of months has done nothing to change my commitment and was I to be out tomorrow, I would continue with the same work.

— Schreiner's letter to her family from a police cell, December 1987

In what became known as the Rainbow trial (for the diversity of the defendants) or Yengeni trial (for Tony Yengeni, the first accused), the state pursued terrorism charges – a step-down from the initial treason charges – against Schreiner, Yengeni, his future wife Lumka Nyamza, and 11 others. They were accused of planting two bombs (which had not harmed anyone) and illegal possession of firearms and explosives. The defendants exploited the prosecution for political purposes. When the trial began in early 1989, the defendants refused to plead guilty or not guilty and instead entered a lengthy plea which reversed the charge of terrorism and treason against the state and ended with the statement, "Victory is certain. South Africa shall be free."

Schreiner was among the final six defendants held after others were released, but in March 1991, during an adjournment of the trial and amid ongoing negotiations to end apartheid, Justice Minister Kobie Coetsee announced that they had been indemnified and would be released. In 2000, Schreiner's mother published a memoir of the trial, Time Stretching Fear.

=== SACP Central Committee: 1991 ===
In December 1991, Schreiner was elected for the first time to the Central Committee of the SACP; she has remained a member since then. Although she initially remained in Cape Town after her release from detention, she moved to Johannesburg in 1992 to work at ANC headquarters at Shell House, where she was employed in the office of ANC president Nelson Mandela.

== Post-apartheid career ==
=== Parliament: 1994–1997 ===
In South Africa's first post-apartheid elections in 1994, Schreiner was elected to represent the ANC in the National Assembly, the lower house of the new South African Parliament. She served the ANC's constituency office in Saldanha on the Cape West Coast. While in Parliament, she chaired the committee of the Constitutional Assembly which dealt with negotiating provisions for the post-apartheid security services in the 1996 Constitution; she was also a member of the Joint Standing Committees on Defence and Intelligence. She resigned from her seat in 1997 to join the civil service.

=== Civil service: 1997–2017 ===
From 1997 to 2002, Schreiner held several positions at the National Intelligence Coordinating Committee. From 2002 until 2012, she was Chief Deputy Commissioner for Correctional Services, with responsibility for strategic and operational management of the Department of Correctional Services; she initially deputised Commissioner Linda Mti. During that time, for about ten months between 2009 and 2010, she was acting National Commissioner. In 2012, President Jacob Zuma appointed her to a five-year term as a director-general, initially in the Department of Economic Development and then, from April 2015, in the Presidency's Department of Women. She retired from the civil service when her term expired in November 2017.

=== Retirement: 2017–present ===
Though retired from the civil service, Schreiner worked full-time at the SACP's headquarters until the party's 15th National Congress in 2022, heading the SACP secretariat (then under General Secretary Blade Nzimande). At the congress, she was re-elected to another five years on the SACP Central Committee – her eighth consecutive term on the committee. During her time at SACP headquarters, Nzimande, in his capacity as Minister of Transport, appointed her as a member of the interim board at the Passenger Rail Agency, and she was also appointed to a three-year term on the board of Broadband Infraco.

Schreiner also remained active in the ANC. In 2021, the ANC National Executive Committee appointed her to a committee formed to provide interim leadership to the MK Military Veterans' Association, and in 2022, she and Nathi Mthethwa were appointed to assist Thandi Modise as a three-man task team evaluating the status of the ANC Women's League's leadership under Bathabile Dlamini. In February 2023, she was appointed to a five-year term as a member of the ANC's internal Integrity Commission, chaired by Frank Chikane and Sophie Williams-de Bruyn.

== Personal life ==
In 1995, while in Parliament, Schreiner said that she was a single mother to a young child. In 2001, with Marion Sparg and Gwen Ansell, she co-edited Comrade Jack, a collection of writings by, and biographical sketches of, SACP stalwart Jack Simons.
