= 1904 Cape Colony parliamentary election =

- January & February 1904

All 95 seats in the Assembly 48 seats needed for a majority
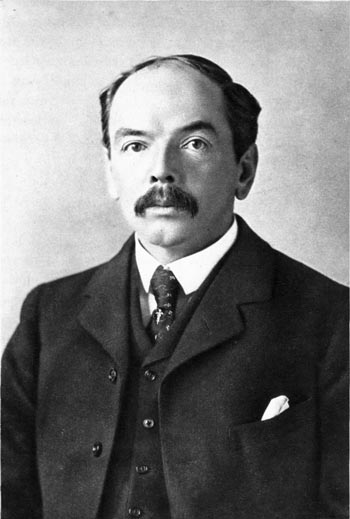

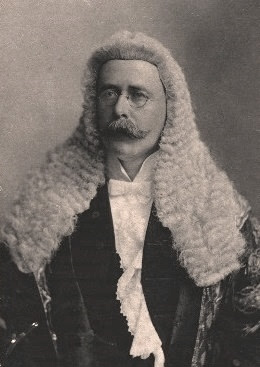
	Majority party	Minority party
Leader	Leander Starr Jameson	James Tennant Molteno
Party	Progressive	South African Party
Leader's seat	Grahamstown	Somerset East
Seats won	50	42
Seat change	▲6
- Green - Cape Progressive Party; Blue - South African Party; Grey - Independent
Prime Minister before election
Gordon Sprigg
Independent Progressive
Elected Prime Minister
Leander Starr Jameson
Progressive

Elections for the House of Assembly were held in Cape Colony in 1904. The election was a victory for the Progressives under Leander Starr Jameson, who had first achieved prominence for his role in the ill-fated Jameson Raid.

The incumbent Prime Minister Gordon Sprigg had been elected in 1898 as a Progressive, however the Progressives had been wracked by internal divisions. Whilst most of the party had been able to reconcile under Jameson, Sprigg and his Commissioner of Public Works Arthur Douglass, had been forced to contest the election as Independent Progressives. Both of them would lose their seats to Progressive candidates. The election also saw former Prime Minister William Schreiner lose his seat. Sprigg would resign as Prime Minister some days after the last results were announced, and was succeeded by Jameson. Following the election James Tennant Molteno would be replaced by John X. Merriman as leader of the South African Party.

Thirteen constituencies were uncontested. Following the election of 95 members, Act 4 was passed, which gave a further twelve seats to the House. These were elected through by-elections in the same year.

== Results ==
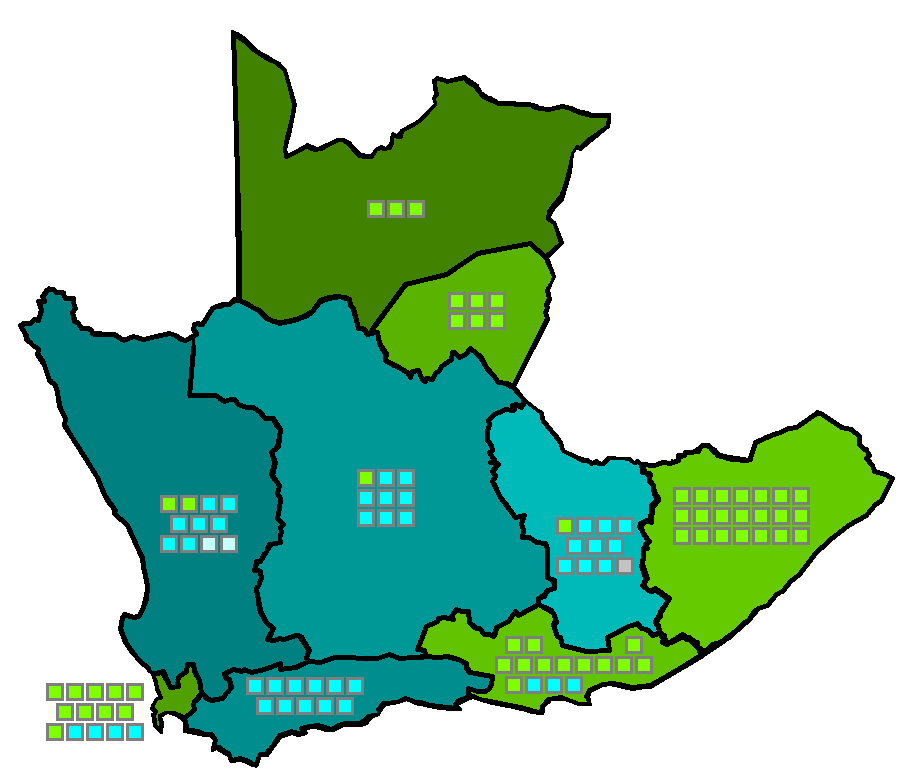
Map of Legislative Assembly results by province.

Party	Votes	%	Seats	+/–
Progressive Party			50	+6
South African Party			42	New
Independent–South African Party alliance			2	–
Pro-SAP independent			1	–
Labour Party			0	New
Other parties			0	–
Total			95	+16
Total votes	83,801	–		
Registered voters/turnout	135,177	61.99		
Source: Smith

== Statistics ==
Constituency	Seats	Registered voters	Votes available	Votes cast
Albany	2	2,036	4,072	3,091
Albert	2	1,824	3,648	2,324
Aliwal North	2	1,452	2,904	2,271
Barkly West	2	1,953	3,906	2,246
Beaufort West	2	2,124	4,248	2,696
Caledon	2	2,478	4,956	3,469
Cape Town	7	17,131	119,917	43,108
Cathcart	1	1,171	1,171	814
Clanwilliam	2	1,713	3,426	Unopposed
Colesberg	2	2,184	4,368	3,062
Cradock	2	2,025	4,050	Unopposed
East London	3	4,697	14,091	5,036
Fort Beaufort	2	1,659	3,318	2,516
George	4	4,002	16,008	10,593
Graaff-Reinet	2	2,417	4,834	2,727
Graham's Town	2	1,837	3,674	1,834
Griqualand East	2	1,989	3,978	Unopposed
Humansdorp	1	1,395	1,395	Unopposed
Jansenville	2	1,937	3,874	Unopposed
Kimberley	4	6,404	25,616	12,683
King William's Town	3	2,800	8,400	3,449
Malmesbury	2	2,443	4,886	Unopposed
Mafeking	1	758	758	Unopposed
Middelburg	1	1,484	1,484	Unopposed
Namaqualand	2	2,016	4,032	3,133
Oudtshoorn	3	3,060	9,180	4,313
Paarl	3	2,864	8,592	6,890
Piquetberg	2	1,582	3,164	2,332
Prieska	1	1,029	1,029	736
Port Elizabeth	5	10,951	54,755	22,049
Queen's Town	3	3,617	10,851	5,514
Richmond	2	1,922	3,844	1,977
Riversdale	2	2,209	4,418	Unopposed
Simon's Town	1	1,634	1,634	1,104
Somerset East	2	2,577	5,154	4,300
Stellenbosch	2	2,195	4,390	3,559
Swellendam	2	2,695	5,390	3,605
Tembuland	2	2,789	5,578	4,079
Uitenhage	3	3,080	9,240	5,712
Victoria East	2	779	1,558	1,029
Victoria West	2	2,334	4,668	Unopposed
Vryburg	2	944	1,888	Unopposed
Wodehouse	2	2,001	4,002	2,663
Woodstock	3	6,442	19,326	8,176
Worcester	3	3,630	10,890	Unopposed
Wynberg	3	4,914	14,742	4,079
Total	107	135,177	437,307	187,169
Source: Statistical register of the colony of the Cape of Good Hope
