= The Buddhist Priest's Wife =

"The Buddhist Priest's Wife" is a short story written by Olive Schreiner, first published in 1922 in a posthumous collection of Schriener's stories titled Stories, Dreams and Allegories. Schreiner originally wrote "The Buddhist Priest's Wife" in Matjiesfontein, South Africa in 1891.

Narrated in the third person, the story recounts a conversation leading to a final goodbye between a nameless man and woman. The behavior and attitude of the woman is most likely a representation of the New Woman, which was a popular feminist ideal at the time the story was written and published.

== Plot summary ==
The story begins with an unknown narrator saying to cover up the corpse of a woman; the speaker reflects on how this woman would like to rest now after travelling the world and accomplishing so much. The narrator asks a series of questions, revealing the character of the woman; she was intellectual, stoic, and loved by many men and women, but was somehow alone her entire life and would want to be now. The speaker states that the woman looks young, so life must have been wonderful to her.

The story shifts to a woman sitting by a fire in a recently packed up room in London. An old woman comes to check on the younger one to bring her a cup of tea. The young woman announces that she will be leaving right after her guest has come to visit her. The young woman ignores the tea and takes a silver cigarette case out of her pocket and begins to smoke by the fire. After a couple cigarettes and pacing around the room for a time, her guest, a man in evening dress, arrives.

The two sit down together. It has been a while since the two had last met, the man is uncertain, but the young woman specifically identifies the timeframe as seven months. She offers him a cigarette and he insists she smoke with him as an exception, even though she normally does not smoke with men. The two discuss work and holiday before the young woman suggests he travel to Norway. She brings up a book she had sent him on sport in Norway, which he does not realize until now that it was a gift from her; she explains that there is a list she wrote at the back of the book with everything he would need for the trip.

They discuss her decision to leave for India, and the man critiques her character, explaining that she should settle down, marry, and be a successful woman in London, not waste her life travelling abroad and meeting foreign peoples. The two go back and forth about marriage, sex, love from the point of their gender, but they are do not agree with the other. The young woman suggests he find a conventional American woman to suit his personal goals. After a while of discussion, the two prepare to leave. He asks when he will be seeing her again, and she says "Oh, not at all!", explaining that by saying good-bye to everyone she will not feel like she needs to come back. He does not believe her to be serious stating, "You must come in ten years' time and we'll compare notes - you about your Buddhist Priest, I about my fair ideal American; and we'll see who succeeded best." She laughs, and the two of them put their coats on by the door.

She asks the man for a kiss, and he obliges. The speaker adds that, years later, the man ponders if the young woman had touched the top of his head affectionately, like a mother to a sleeping child, but he cannot remember. The man then looks around the room; the young woman is gone. He rings the bell for the old woman who says the lady has gone already, leaving in a cab that was waiting for her. He asks where she had gone, but the old woman does not know and explains, “she had left orders that all her letters should be kept for six or eight months till she wrote and sent her address”. The narrator states that this was eight years ago, and repeats how beautiful life must have been to "it" (the corpse) because it looks so young.

== Analysis ==
In her article, "The Lifted Veil: Women and Short Fiction in the 1880s and 1890s", Clare Hanson, a professor at the University of Leicester, suspects that the genderless narrator is a woman based on the tone of narration. Hanson reflects on how the narrator shifts the pronouns from 'she' to 'it' in the ending, explaining that this shift could be interpreted as the narrator feeling uneasy with the dead body because its appearance has disturbed the boundaries of life and death.

In Elke D'hoker and Stephanie Eggermont's article "Fin-de-Siècle Women Writers and the Modern Short Story", the two professors at the University of Leuvan, Belgium, explain that Schreiner effectively opens her story with the death of the main character, giving the story a strong sense of transience before the narrative changes to the young woman's life.

The young woman and the man have an unconventional conversation, openly speaking about topics like sex and marriage. The young woman is attempting to express her love for the man in intellectual way, but he fails to see the meaning behind her words and realize that she is in love with him. Because of his blindness towards her love, the young woman thus advises the man to find a 'neutral' type of woman from America to suit his needs. This story shows a woman revealing to a man her desire to be with him, but the man cannot comprehend an independent woman who deviates from stereotypical femininity. The man expresses that she is doing nothing important in her life by being an so unorthodox to her gender. His ignorance of the young woman's affections lead her to leave London for India, living a self-destructive life that she knows will kill her; however, the narrator shows us that the young woman finds freedom from the gender constraints set by a patriarchal society.
