= 1908 Cape Colony parliamentary election =

- 21 January 1908 (Council); 12–31 March 1908 (House)

All 107 seats in the House of Assembly 54 seats needed for a majority All 26 seats in the Legislative Council 14 seats needed for a majority
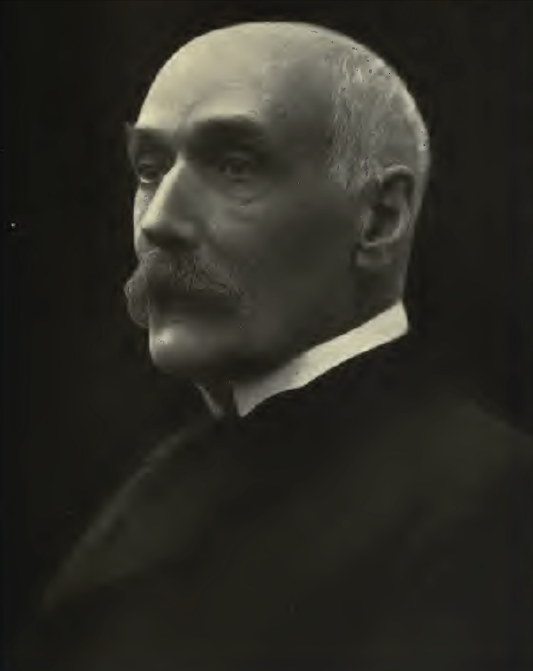

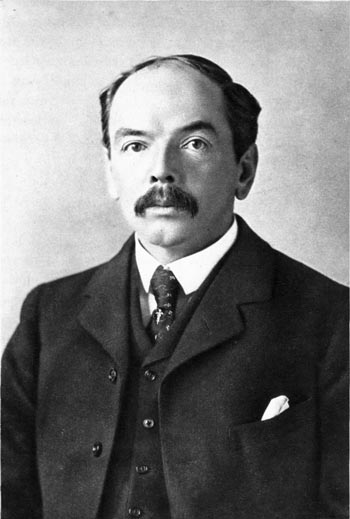
	Majority party	Minority party
Leader	John X. Merriman	Leander Starr Jameson
Party	South African	Progressive
Seats won	69 (House); 14 (Council)	33 (House); 5 (Council)
- Blue - South African Party; Green - Progressive Party
Prime Minister before election
Leander Starr Jameson
Progressive
Elected Prime Minister
John X. Merriman
South African Party

Elections for the Parliament of the Cape of Good Hope were held in Cape Colony in 1908. The South African party led by John X. Merriman defeated the governing Progressive Party under Leander Starr Jameson. These elections would be the last for the Cape Colony, with the National Convention that agreed the constitutional framework for the Union of South Africa beginning later that year.

Elections for the Legislative Council were held on 21 January, except for Eastern Province where the election was delayed until 21 February due to the death of a candidate. On 31 January Jameson resigned as Premier after it became clear that the Progressives had lost their majority in the council, which would make governing difficult - even if they could win a majority in the Assembly elections later that year. Merriman was appointed Premier on 3 February, ahead of both the Council election for Eastern Province and the Assembly elections.

== Results ==
=== Legislative Council ===
Party	Seats
South African Party	17
Progressive Party	8
Independents	1
Total	26
Source: Smith, pg.69

=== Legislative Assembly ===
Party	Seats	+/–
South African Party	69	+27
Progressive Party	33	–17
Independents	5	+5
Total	107	+12
Source: Smith pg.72
