= Henrietta Stakesby Lewis =

Henrietta Stakesby Lewis (née Schreiner; also known as "Sister Schreiner"; 1850–1912) was a South African temperance leader. She was associated with the Independent Order of Good Templars (IOGT) and Bands of Hope. Lewis was instrumental in inspiring her brother, the legislator, Theophilus Lyndall Schreiner, to the temperance cause.

== Early life and education ==
Henrietta (nicknames, "Ettie" and "Het") Rebecca Schreiner was born at Umpukani Mission Station, Orange Free State (now Free State Province), January 1, 1850 or August 7, 1850. Her parents were missionaries of the London Missionary Society and her childhood was spent at the various mission stations. Her siblings were Olive Schreiner, author, Theophilus Lyndall Schreiner, legislator and temperance leader, and William P. Schreiner, Prime Minister of the Cape. Oliver Schreiner was a nephew; Katie H. R. Stuart was a niece.

Schreiner grew up in the area of the Kat River.

She was educated at home by her mother and for one year at Miss Hanbury's Girls’ School, Cape Town.

== Career ==
When seventeen years of age she went to Kimberley to keep house for her brother, Senator T. L. Schreiner, remaining until 1884. She witnessed the terrible effects of drink upon the natives (Khoisans) of the country; became an ardent advocate of temperance; and persuaded her brother to give up a promising career in Kimberley and join her in working for Prohibition for South Africa.

She joined the IOGT at Kimberley, realizing that through this organization she could best combat the curse of liquor; and as "Sister Schreiner", she became known throughout South Africa. Her own influence, with that of her brother and her niece, Katie Stuart, lifted Good Templary and made it a powerful instrument for good in the Union. The Dutch term “Goede Tempelrie” is synonymous with Abstinence throughout the country.

Sister Schreiner began her work in the Kimberley diamond fields in 1870, when atheism was rampant and natives were buried by the dozen every Monday morning, slain by the effects of alcohol. In those days, there were fifty murders a year, and the mining-camps, then without compounds, were destitute of Christian ministers. It was considered the correct thing for gentlemen to get drunk, and regarded as immoral for women to speak in public. Sister Schreiner braved public opinion and held meetings in the camps. She was characterized as being quite eloquent. Her Sunday meetings for both Europeans and natives overflowed the pavilion provided by her brother. Weeknights were largely given over to schools and gospel work for the natives.

The Schreiners, sister and brother, devoted all their time and money to the work. When their funds were exhausted, they prayed for further financial aid, which was always forthcoming. From 1870 until her death, Sister Schreiner was special deputy of the IOGT and for a large part of the time, traveled over the country, instituting lodges and Bands of Hope. She held various offices in the Grand Lodges of South Africa, and was made R.W.G. Vice Templar at Edinburgh in 1891. She was also Grand True Templar of the Western Grand Temple, Independent Order of True Templars, an organization which she instituted for natives and colored people, and which at one time attained a membership of almost 30,000.

In 1883, Sister Schreiner left Kimberley to seek a more favorable climate for the four children of her deceased sister, who were left in her charge. She located at Worcester, in the heart of the wineland brandy-farming districts of the Cape Province. Fresh from contact with the effects of the industry, she denounced it from every available platform. A powerful upheaval followed, and many were gathered into Good Templar Lodges and True Temples. As a result, she was persecuted and anathematized. Her followers were excommunicated from the churches, many of whose members gained their livelihood from the vineyards. At Ceres, an elder of the Dutch Reformed Church prayed: "Oh God! deliver us from this daughter of Belial in our midst." More than once her life was in danger, but continued her work. In a few years, she saw hundreds of drunkards reformed, Christians converted to abstinence, and wine-farmers and hotel-keepers destroying their stocks of liquor.

In 1891, she married John Stakesby Lewis, an attorney of Robertson, Cape province, who had a large family of children, some of whom were in the front of the Prohibition movement. After her marriage, she removed to Cape Town, becoming well known for her many activities at "The Highlands", where she conducted a home for destitute men, a creche for fatherless children, a sanitarium, and continued her campaign against vice and alcohol. Though suffering from a severe form of heart disease, she organized the successful crusade of 1907 and headed the procession of women who marched to the Cape Parliament and presented a huge petition against flooding the province's cafes and restaurants with light wines.

Sister Schreiner travelled extensively, lecturing on temperance and evangelism, her travels taking her to Britain, Australia, New Zealand and the U.S.

Thousands of temperance advocates in South Africa received their initial inspiration from Sister Schreiner.

== Death and legacy ==
Henrietta Schreiner Stakesby Lewis died at Cape Town May 31, 1912.

For her success in the work, she was inscribed in the roll of honor of the World's Woman's Christian Temperance Union. Her memory was also perpetuated by the Stakesby Lewis Hostels, a group of four hotels for natives in Cape Town, founded by her niece Katie H. R. Stuart. These hostels were largely instrumental in keeping native visitors to the city away from temptation, furnishing decent accommodations, with no liquor sold on the premises.

The Henrietta Schreiner (Ettie, Mrs Stakesby Lewis) file is held in the Special Collections of the University of Cape Town Libraries. The HR Stakesby-Lewis Collection is held by the National Archives & Records Service of South Africa.
