= 1898 Cape Colony parliamentary election =

- 16 March 1898 (Council); 9 August–5 September 1898 (House)

All 79 seats in the House of Assembly 40 seats needed for a Majority All 23 Seats in the Legislative Council 12 seats needed for a majority
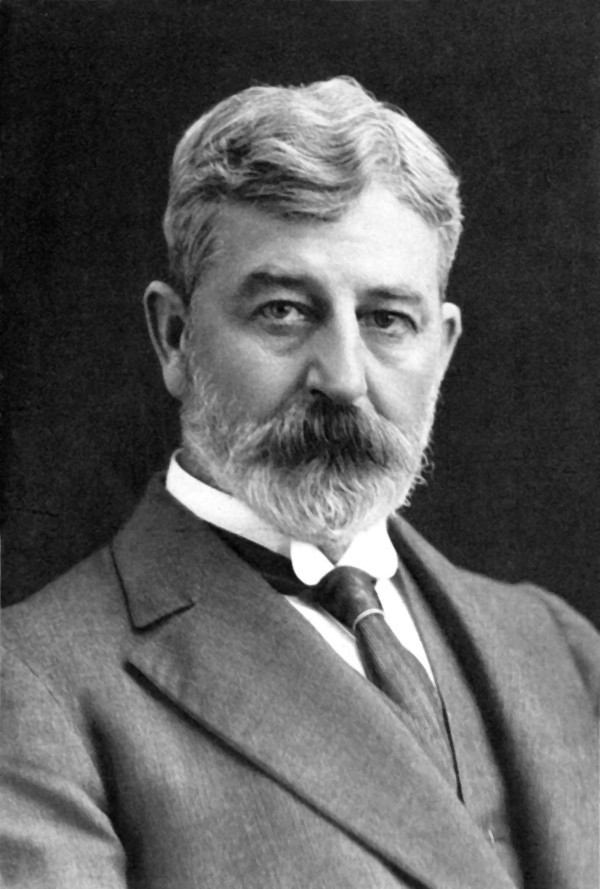

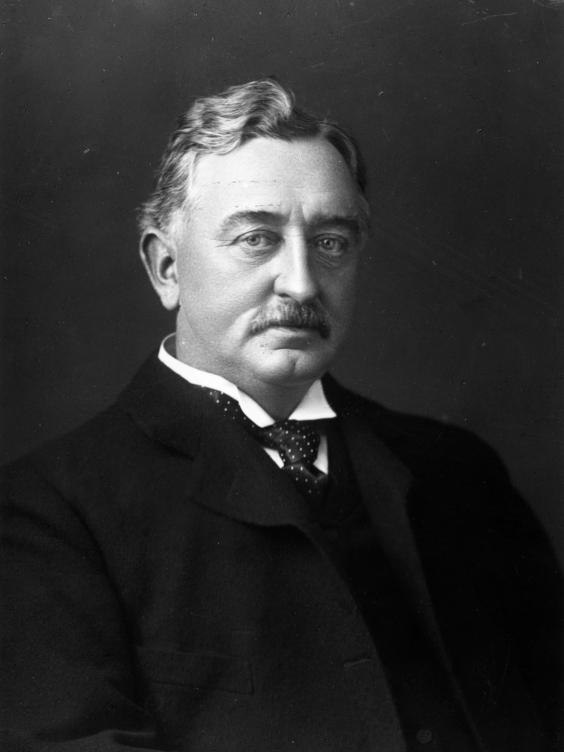
| | Majority party | Minority party |
|---|---|---|
| Leader | W. P. Schreiner | Cecil Rhodes |
| Party | Independent - Afrikaner Bond | Progressive |
| Leader's seat | Malmesbury | Barkly West, Namaqualand (vacated) |
| Seats won | 40 (House); 9 (Council) | 38 (House); 14 (Council) |
| Popular vote | 52,388 | 73,097 |
| Percentage | 38.0% | 53.1% |
- Green - Progressive Party; Blue - Ind/Afrikaner Bond alliance
Prime Minister before election
Gordon Sprigg
Independent Progressive
Elected Prime Minister
W. P. Schreiner
Independent

Elections to the Parliament of the Colony of the Cape of Good Hope were held in 1898. The Legislative Council was elected on 16 March and the House of Assembly between 9 August and 5 September. These were the first elections contested on a more-or-less two-party basis after the emergence of responsible government in 1872. Party divisions were still hazy at the time of the elections, but the result was a narrow victory for opponents of the Progressive Party of Cecil Rhodes, despite the Progressives winning the popular vote. Incumbent Prime Minister Gordon Sprigg had become aligned with the nascent Progressive party, and was succeeded by William Philip Schreiner, an independent supported by the Afrikaner Bond, upon the inauguration of the new House of Assembly.

== Electoral System ==
Twenty-three members of the Legislative Council were elected from nine constituencies termed "provinces," seven of which elected three members each by cumulative voting, and the remaining two provinces one member each. The House of Assembly was composed of 79 members elected from 39 electoral divisions which elected between one and four members each, in which each voter had as many votes as there were candidates to be elected, but was not permitted to cast them cumulatively, as for the Legislative Council.

Since the last election British Bechuanaland had joined the Cape Colony, gaining three seats in the Assembly and one in the Council.

== Results ==
=== House of Assembly ===
The fact that voters in different constituencies could cast varying numbers of votes, and that votes were not counted where any candidates ran unopposed, means that raw popular vote totals are a poor estimate of party support. Alan John Charrington Smith's analysis of voting patterns estimated that support was approximately 43,243 voters (57.35%) for the Progressive party and 32,165 (42.65%) for its opponents. The table below lists raw vote totals.

| Party | Votes | % | Seats |
|---|---|---|---|
| Independent–Afrikaner Bond Alliance | 52,388 | 38.04 | 40 |
| Progressive Party | 73,097 | 53.08 | 38 |
| Independents | 12,232 | 8.88 | 1 |
| Total | 137,717 | 100.00 | 79 |

=== Legislative Council ===
The Progressive candidate in Griqualand West was elected unopposed. All other provinces had more candidates than seats to fill.

| Party | Votes | % | Seats |
|---|---|---|---|
| Progressive Party | 98,530 | 55.72 | 14 |
| Independent–Afrikaner Bond Alliance | 70,214 | 39.70 | 9 |
| Independents | 8,096 | 4.58 | 0 |
| Total | 176,840 | 100.00 | 23 |
