= Three Dreams in a Desert =

Three Dreams in a Desert was first published in Olive Schreiner's Dreams. Dreams is compiled of eleven short stories which follow her experience of dreams in South Africa. Three Dreams in a Desert is in part four.

== Plot ==
Three Dreams in a Desert is a short story of three fragmented dreams. It's set in an African plain, under a mimosa tree, a peaceful woman lies down and falls asleep.

The first dream is of two figures in a desert. One called Man is healthy, standing and strong, the other, Woman, is ill, lying down, and weak. Woman cannot stand because of the history of gender expectations and stereotypes placed on her. She is deemed weak since Man has never seen her move because they are worried about himself more than they are about her. In the past, Man and Women walked side by side as equals, but Man put his burden of subjection on her. In the dream, he cuts the band of burden off her back – but only a man could do that for Woman. Man drags her down and has no hope for success of Woman. Woman held her head up despite the lack of faith Man had for her to ever return to a stable state.

In the second dream, a woman named Truth, was coming out of a desert. The woman is seeking simple Freedom. Freedom is presented as something far away and difficult to reach, but is easily achievable for men. She asked a man named Reason about finding Freedom. Reason suggests that it can be found only one way - “down the banks of labor, through the water of suffering.“ She proceeds to ask many questions about the journey to Freedom. The man shares many negative attributes including the deep water and difficult footing. He finishes by telling her that no woman has successfully reached Freedom. Nonetheless, she took her dingy clothes and shoes of dependence off and started her journey for Freedom feeling very lonely and hopeless.

The final dream is of the future. The woman dreams of a place where women and men work, live, and play together without judgement or fear. The man said this could only be possible in the Future.

== Critical reception ==
The reception was overall positive during the fin de siècle as Schreiner's work was becoming popular. Trends with her work included ideas the New Woman, feminism, and religious beliefs. Several critics note her talent of creating an unknown character and forming the plot around that character. For example, in Three Dreams in a Desert, Schreiner uses the readers’ previous knowledge of gender expectations and stereotypes and uses them to her advantage in her writing with the characters being Man and Woman. Many applauded Schreiner's work for the progressiveness of its time. A small number of critics were critical of these same issues. More recently, Schreiner's work has been recognized for its inventive form of dreams, unknown figures, unique dialogue, and incorporating her experiences from South Africa.

== Characters ==
The characters are very stereotypical in their gender roles. Man is confident, strong, and successful. The woman in the story struggles to find strength to keep going and finds it impossible to do the same things Man does. Schreiner depicts gender expectations very well in the short story. Her understanding of what women have experienced through centuries of inequality are evident in her work.

== Analysis and themes ==
Three Dreams in a Desert engages the themes of gender expectations, male dominance, freedom, harmonious existence. Olive Schreiner shows many allegories and themes in her writing. The allegory of a woman's evolution is depicted well in the story. The way the Future and Truth impact the man and woman differently shows the trend those and other virtues of life have on men compared to women. The theme of crossing is prevalent in many of Schreiner's writings. In Three Dreams in a Desert, the second dream is of the woman who needs to cross the large body of water to reach Freedom. The hardships of the physical journey such as difficult footing, treacherous tides, and no bridge are all a metaphor for the actual hardships women find on their journey to freedom and truth. Additionally, Reason, in the second dream has such weight and power. Schreiner chose Man to be Reason to depict the power man has in situations like Three Dreams in a Desert when there is a vulnerable woman in need of freedom and truth, yet Man stands in the way again.
