= Theophilus Lyndall Schreiner =

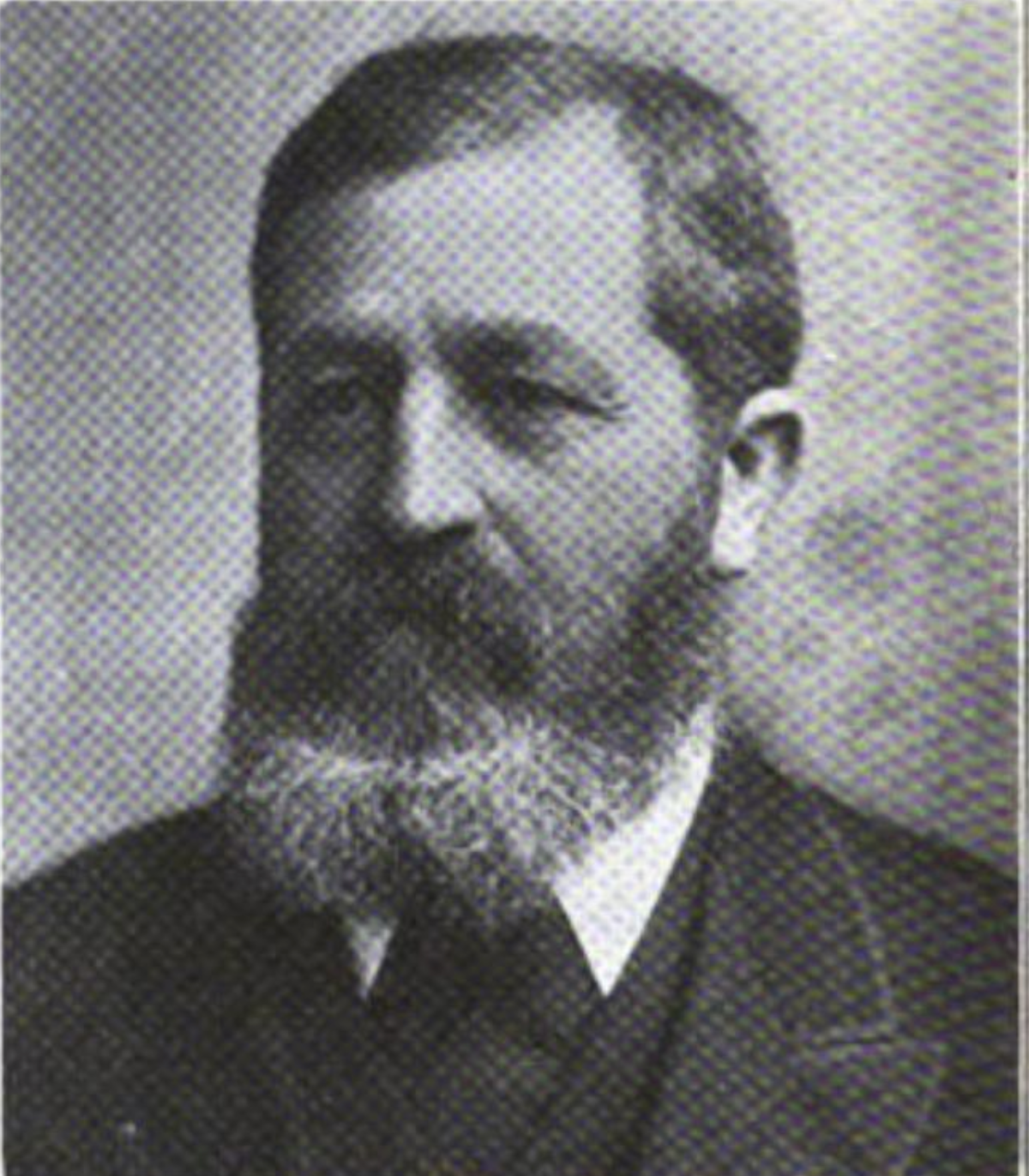
- Schreiner in a 1929 publication.
- Born: April 21, 1844; Colesberg, Cape of Good Hope Province
- Died: January 23, 1920 (aged 75); Cape Town, South Africa
- Other names: nickname, Theo
- Education: London University
- Occupations: educator; legislator; social reformer
- Organizations: Independent Order of Good Templars (IOGT); Independent Order of True Templars (IOTT)
- Known for: One of the best known temperance and Prohibition leaders in South Africa
- Title: Senator
- Political party: Progressive party
- Relatives: William P. Schreiner (brother); Olive Schreiner Cronwright (sister); Henrietta Schreiner Stakesby Lewis (sister); Katie H. R. Stuart (niece)

Theophilus Lyndall Schreiner (1844-1920) was a South African educator, legislator, and social reform leader. During his 45 years of active service in the cause of temperance reform, Schreiner received no salary or pecuniary remuneration whatever. He was extremely well-liked and well-received by all denominations, and while on his lecture-tours throughout central South Africa, he spoke from the pulpits of many different churches.

== Early life and education ==
Theophilus Lyndall Schreiner (nickname, Theo) was born at Colesberg, Cape of Good Hope Province, on April 21,1844. The Schreiner family was for many years prominent in South African affairs. His father, the Rev. Gottlob Schreiner, was a Wesleyan Methodist minister who had been sent out to South Africa in 1836 by the London Missionary Society. His youngest brother, the Right Honorable William P. Schreiner, was the leader of the Bar in the Supreme Court of South Africa, and was also Prime Minister of the Cape Colony during the Boer War. One of his sisters was Olive Schreiner Cronwright, the author; and another sister was Henrietta Schreiner Stakesby Lewis, the temperance activist.

After being privately educated by his mother, Theophilus was sent to England to complete his studies. He was a scholar at Wesleyan College (now Queen's College, Taunton, Somersetshire, and gained mathematical honors in matriculation from London University in 1862.

== Career ==
In 1863, he returned to Cape Colony, where he entered the teaching profession, serving first as vice-principal of Shaw College, Grahamstown (1863-68), and later as principal of the Government High School, Cradock (1869-70). For the next nine years (1870-79), he was employed as a diamond-digger and claim-holder on the Vaal River, Kimberley.

It was during this period that Schreiner commenced his activities in behalf of the cause of temperance and Prohibition in which he became one of the best known South African leaders. In 1874, while he was working with his brother, W. P. Schreiner, in the diamond-mines of Kimberley, he was persuaded by his sister Henrietta, herself an ardent temperance worker, to join the Good Templar Order; and he became a life member of Concord Lodge, which he served for two years as Chief Templar (1875-76). Becoming deeply interested in the work of the Order, he began in Kimberley a campaign of temperance and evangelistic work which was carried on untiringly throughout his life.

Schreiner held some of the highest offices in the Good Templar Order in South Africa. He served as District Commander of the West Griqualand District Lodge (1876-77). Grand Commander of the Grand Lodge of Central South Africa (1878-79), and Grand Chief Templar of the last-named body (1880-88). From 1875 to 1880, he was director of the Templar Savings Bank, and he was also for several years editor of the first South African prohibition newspaper, the Templar Advocate and Foe to Strong Drink.

In 1873 Schreiner, together with Messrs. Kayser, Fraser, Geard, Spindler. Wedderburn, Stakesby Lewis, Makiwane, and Morris, he founded the Independent Order of True Templars (IOTT), an organization, at one time embracing 24,000 members, similar to the Good Templar Order, for the benefit of such of the indigenous and other colored people as had come under the influence of the missionaries.

In 1875, he became voluntary unpaid chaplain of the Kimberley jail, which post he held for a period of nine years, devoting all of his Sundays to evangelistic as well as to temperance reform work.

After carefully studying the scientific and moral aspects of the alcohol question, and familiarizing himself with the fundamental teachings of such organizations as the IOGT, Bands of Hope, and IOTT, Schreiner started out, in 1880, on a temperance missionary tour through central South Africa which made his name a household word throughout the country. Taking Kimberley as his base, he traveled up and down the Orange Free State, almost entirely at his own expense, holding numerous public meetings and founding many Templar lodges and branches of the Band of Hope Union. It was largely due to his efforts that the Legislature of the Orange Free State passed the provincial liquor measure Ordinance No. 10 of 1883, which provided for the total prohibition of the sale of intoxicating liquors to non-Europeans (indigenous population), and confined its sale to the hotels in towns, thus closing up the country canteens.

He next traveled for about two years (1885-1886 through Transvaal Province, where he engaged in the same general activities as in the Orange Free State. The following three years (1887-89), he spent in a second preaching- and lecture-tour of the Free State.

Realizing that his work in behalf of the temperance cause among the indigenous tribes of central South Africa could not possibly be brought to a successful termination without the passage of stricter prohibitive legislation and some radical changes in the existing Cape law, Schreiner decided to enter Parliament, and accordingly stood (1884) for Kimberley as a candidate for the Cape House of Assembly, but he was defeated by a narrow margin.

Not daunted by his defeat, he continued his evangelistic and temperance campaigns throughout the country, and bided his time. In 1889, together with his sister, Henrietta Schreiner, and his niece, Katie H. R. Stuart, he was elected to represent the IOTT at the historic Reunion Session of the two International Supreme Lodges of the IOGT at Chicago, Illinois. At this session, Schreiner and his colleagues were successful in securing the retention of the degrees of Hope and Charity and other privileges for the Good Templars of South Africa.

After the session, Schreiner's health, undermined by twelve years of unceasing strain, gave way, and he was compelled to seek rest and recuperation during the next eighteen months (1890-91), which he spent traveling in Europe, Egypt, and the Holy Land.

Upon his return to South Africa, in 1892, he at once resumed his temperance lecture-tours, and for the ensuing eight years traveled through the Cape Province, where he succeeded in establishing a number of temperance missions among the Dutch and English inhabitants. Unfortunately his activities were cut short by the outbreak of the Boer War (1899). which arrested all temperance work in South Africa for several years.

In 1900, Schreiner was sent to Great Britain, as a representative of the South African Vigilance Association, to present to the British Government the views and wishes of those in South Africa who were still loyal to the British Empire. After remaining for a year in England, he returned to South Africa, and became more active than ever in political and temperance circles. In 1903, he was elected Right Worthy Templar in the IOTT, and he continued to hold that office till his death.

Schreiner always believed in and strove for a more liberal native policy in South Africa, and, to further this aim he, for the second time, became a candidate for the Cape Parliament. He won one of the Thembuland seats in the Cape House of Assembly for the Progressive party in 1904, and from that time until his death, he was the acknowledged leader of the temperance forces in Parliament. Always the indefatigable champion of native interests, and the loyal and energetic supporter of plans for the moral and social betterment of his countrymen, Schreiner directed the efforts of the temperance members of the House of Assembly; and their united strength succeeded in defeating the repeated attempts of the pro-liquor agents, who sought to repeal the existing prohibitive and restrictive provisions of the Cape liquor law. He once brought forward in the House a resolution favoring a direct vote of the people on the liquor question, but the measure was overridden by the liquor forces in that body.

In 1909-10, Schreiner was returned unopposed by the Progressive party as member for Tembuland to the House of Assembly of the First Parliament of the Union of South Africa, and for the next five years, he continued to lead the struggle against the anti-native and pro-liquor factions in the new legislative body.

In 1914, he became chairman of the People’s Direct Vote movement for the control of the liquor traffic, and he continued in that capacity until his death. Most of the campaigns of this organization for the enactment of protective legislation during this period were managed by him, and a number of important victories were realized.

When his brother, the Rt. Hon. W. P. Schreiner, went to London, England (1915), as High Commissioner of the Union of South Africa, Theophilus was appointed by the governor-general of the Union, Sydney Buxton, 1st Earl Buxton, to serve in his brother’s place as one of the four senators who were appointed mainly because of their acquaintance with the reasonable wants and wishes of the colored and native population.

In 1916, Schreiner introduced in Parliament a People’s Direct Vote bill, which he guided through its various stages in the Senate, only to have it rejected when it went to the Lower House. In that same year, however, he was more successful in the passage, after two defeats, of his important amendment to the Innis Liquor Act, which had failed to include the Bechuanaland indigenous population and which had resulted in their country being flooded with liquor. His amendment asked that all natives be included within the scope of the Innis restrictive provisions. The passage of this amendment corrected an oversight and a grievance which had been tolerated for eighteen years.

Senator Schreiner was an active and faithful supporter of the South African Temperance Alliance for a quarter of a century, and for several years was its vice-president. In 1917, when the Alliance became united with the South African People’s Union for the Direct Vote, of which body Schreiner was at the time chairman of the executive, he was unanimously chosen first president of the reconstructed and reorganized South African Temperance Alliance. When compelled, in 1919, to give up this office because of failing health, he received a touching ovation at the Triennial Convention and was made honorary vice-president for life.

Senator Schreiner wrote and published a large number of pamphlets and tracts, both in Dutch and in English, dealing with various aspects of the temperance and Prohibition movement and with the native question in South Africa. Some of his more important writings were: “Misleading Figures,” in the Tribune for November, 1918; “Scientific Temperance Teaching in Day Schools,” issued by the South African Band of Hope Union, July 1902; and “Teetotalism and Theology,” in the Cape Times for December 30, 1893.

The name of Schreiner, together with the names of the other nine founders of the Independent Order of True Templars, has been inscribed upon one of the columns supporting the Temple of Total Abstinence and Prohibition, the representation of which appears on every Grand Temple charter.

== Death and legacy ==
Theophilus Lyndall Schreiner died at Cape Town, South Africa, January 23, 1920. The Cape Times of January 24, 1920, said of him:

"In him the natives have lost a friend who has pleaded their cause, often in the teeth of ridicule and prejudice, but with a steadfast earnestness which has had a veryreal influence in shaping native policy in South Africa. He had the courage of his convictions in times and in places when his convictions were not popular. In him was the stuff of the natural philanthropist; a very lovable personality with all his eccentricities ; a simple and gentle and unselfish South African, who shared with his brother an all-embracing love for his country and its peoples."

His papers are held by National Archives and Records Service of South Africa.

== Selected works ==
He was the author of several works including:

- Segregation
- Circular : Capetown, July 20th, 1891., 1891
- Government Liquor Monopoly in Russia and the Transvaal, 1901
- Mr. Theo. Schreiner's Report. Reprinted from Cape Times, Nov. 13th, 1901, 1901
- Some Aspects of the Native Question in South Africa : a reply to an article by Mr. Cronwright Schreiner in "The Manchester guardian" of October 30th, 1900 , 1901
- Some Ideas of a South African about the War. Ex. "Journal of the Royal United Service Institution" for Sept. 1901., 1901
- Some Letters on the South African Question and A Prayer for Peace 1899-1901, 1901
- The Afrikander Bond and Other Causes of the War, 1901
- The Black Man and the Franchise also Natives and Liquor in South Africa. Together with Some Aspects of the Native Question in South Africa, 1901
- The Causes of the War in South Africa." An address delivered at the Junior Constitutional Club, Piccadilly (London), by Mr. Theophilus Lyndall Schreiner, on Thursday, February 7th, 1901. Mr. H. Crouch Batchelor in the Chair., 1901
- The Liquor War in South Africa. Being papers prepared for and read at the World's Temperance Congress, London, June 1900, with introductory articles by Miss H. R. Schreiner (Mrs. Stakesby Lewis) and addenda by Mr. Theophilus L. Schreiner., 1901
