= Marion Sparg =

South African activist

Marion Monica Sparg is a South African activist, former guerrilla and public administrator.

== Struggle years ==
Marion Sparg was one of the few white women to join Umkhonto we Sizwe (MK), the armed wing of the African National Congress during South Africa's apartheid era. A Sunday Times journalist, she was prompted into action after 32 ANC members and 19 civilians were killed by the South African Defence Force in an attack on Maseru, Lesotho. She would spend the years between 1981 and 1986 in exile where she received training in guerrilla warfare and worked in the ANC's Communication Department on a publication named Voice of Women and thereafter joined the Special Operations Division of Umkhonto We Sizwe.

In 1986 she was sentenced to 25 years' imprisonment on charges of treason, arson and attempted arson. Pleading guilty to all charges, she admitted planting and exploding limpet mines at Johannesburg's notorious police headquarters, John Vorster Square, and also at Cambridge Police Station in East London.

== Release from prison ==
Following the unbanning of the ANC, she was released in 1991 at the same time as fellow treason prisoners Damian de Lange and Iain Robertson, shortly after which she was nominated to the ANC delegation that participated in an early round of CODESA, the multiparty negotiations that led to South Africa's first multi-racial elections in 1994. In the same year, at the age of 34, she was appointed deputy executive director of the Constitutional Assembly, the body that would draft South Africa's groundbreaking 1996 constitution.

== In government ==
In 1996 she was appointed Town Clerk of the Eastern Metropolitan sub-structure of the Lekoa- Vaal-metropole. Three years later she became the Secretary to the National Council of Provinces (NCOP) and in 2000 joined the office of Bulelani Ngcuka where she became Chief Executive Officer of the National Prosecuting Authority and the accounting officer of the Directorate of Special Operations, commonly known as the Scorpions.

In 2003, amidst a public spat between the National Prosecuting Authority (NPA) and Jacob Zuma, South Africa's then-disgraced deputy president, anonymous letters were sent to the Public Service Commission (PSC) accusing Sparg, her deputy Beryl Simelane and integrity unit head Dipuo Mvelase (also Deputy Chairperson of the South African Communist Party) of tender-rigging, corruption and nepotism. The Commission found no criminal wrongdoing and referred the matter to the Department of Justice and Constitutional Development - the parent body of the NPA. The Department head instituted 30 charges against the three women. South Africa's Financial Mail would describe the allegations as 'bizarre' after the charges were withdrawn at the formal disciplinary hearing, only to be reinstated two days later. They would be officially dropped in early 2007. In June 2007 she resigned from the NPA to take up employment in the private sector. Marion has since joined Draftfcb Social Marketing, a division of Draftfcb SA.

== Other ==
Along with Jenny Schreiner and Gwen Ansell she edited Comrade Jack, a memoir of the late Marxist activist, Jack Simons, who lectured on politics in Umkhonto we Sizwe training camps in Angola and Tanzania.

Other white women who contributed to South Africa's liberation struggle include:

- Conny Braam, Dutch journalist who assisted with Operation Vula and later wrote a book about her anti-apartheid experiences
- Susan de Lange, political prisoner and wife of the guerilla Damian de Lange
- Barbara Hogan, political prisoner
- Janet Love, Operation Vula operative
- Ruth First, ANC activist and wife of Joe Slovo, killed by apartheid government assassins in 1982
- Muff Andersen, former Sunday Times journalist
- Hélèna Passtoors, Belgian citizen
- Guido Van Hecken, Belgian citizen
- Trish Hanekom, who served four years in prison in the 1980s and was deported to her native Zimbabwe on her release.
- Jeanette Curtis Schoon, NUSAS and ANC activist, killed in exile, with her six-year-old daughter Katryn, by apartheid government assassins in 1984
