= South African Party (Cape Colony) =

- Founder: William Schreiner
- Founded: 1896
- Merged into: South African Party
- Ideology: Anti-imperialism; Liberalism; Free trade Non-racialism

The South African Party was a political party in the Cape Colony.

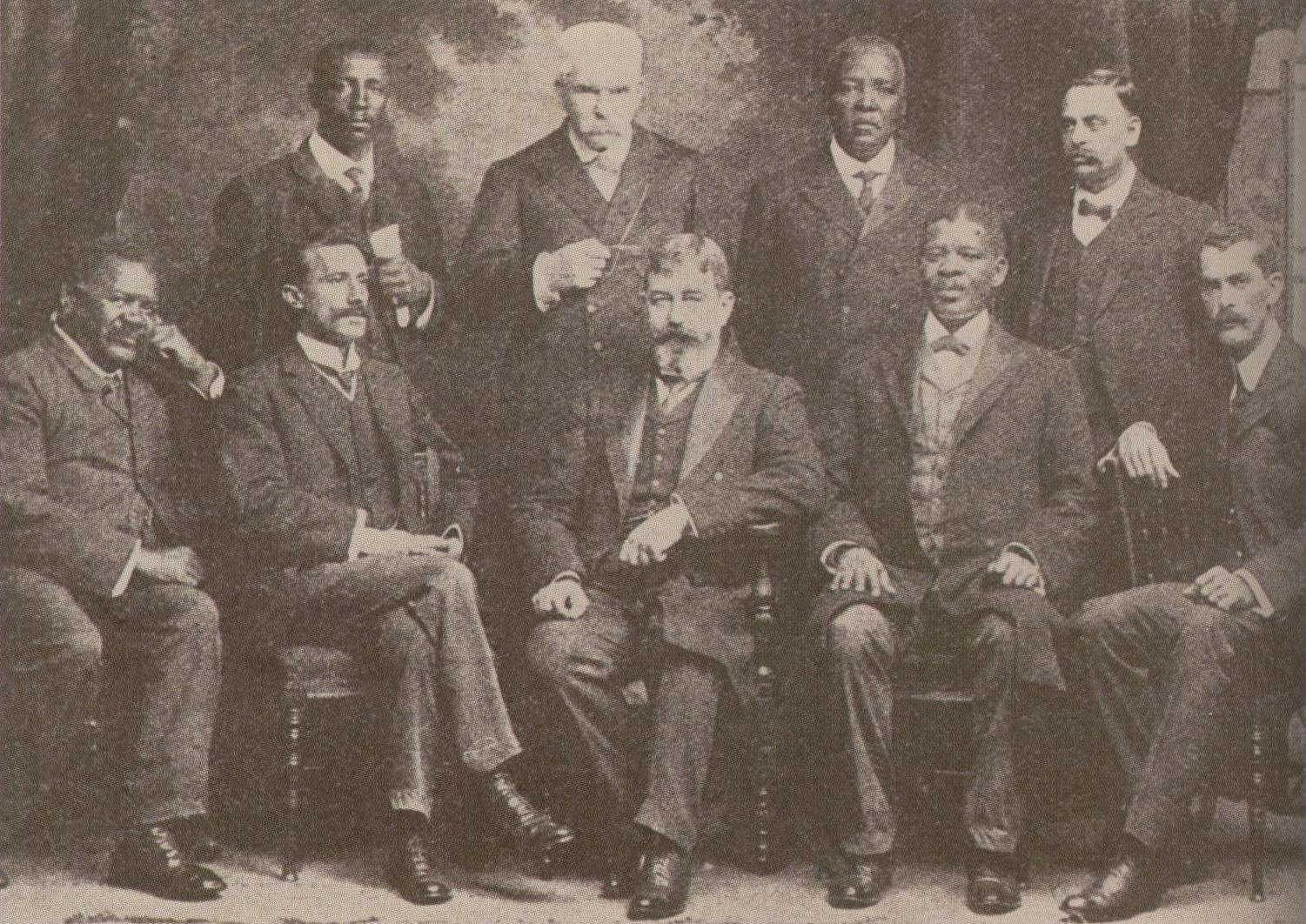
William Schreiner (centre, seated) with South African Party leaders, and activists, including John Tengo Jabavu, Walter Rubusana and Abdurahman in the delegation which lobbied the London Convention on Union for the multi-racial franchise.

== Background and policies ==
The party had its origins in the liberal tradition that arose in the western half of the Cape Colony in its early parliamentary history. In the 1890s, the liberal Afrikaans politician Jacobus W. Sauer led a "South African Political Association" in an attempt to unite the Cape's anti-imperialist opposition.

As a formal party however, it was first founded by William Philip Schreiner, as a means of countering the aggressive imperialist policies of Cecil Rhodes.

The party's platform brought together many of the policies that dated back to the Molteno Ministry, the first elected government of the Cape Colony, such as an emphasis on locally driven development, anti-imperialism, free trade, compulsory education, peaceful relations with neighbouring states and an inclusive attitude to race relations. Supporters of such policies had frequently needed to align with the more extreme Afrikaner Bond in order to counter the powerful pro-imperialist Progressive Party, but the alliance was an uneasy one, as there were major differences with the Afrikaner nationalism of the Bond.

== Government (1908-1910) ==
Under its leader John X. Merriman, the South African Party governed Cape Colony in a unity government with Afrikaner Bond from 1908 until the formation of the Union of South Africa in 1910.

During the National Convention on Union, Merriman and other South African Party representatives fought to extend the Cape's multi-racial franchise system (whereby minor property and literacy suffrage qualifications applied equally to all male citizens, regardless of race) to the rest of South Africa, post-union. This failed, as it was strongly opposed by the other constituent states which were determined to preserve white rule.

== Merger after Union (1910) ==
In the Union parliament, the South African Party, the Afrikaner Bond, Het Volk of the Transvaal and Orangia Unie of the Orange Free State merged to form a new Union-wide South African Party.

After the merger, the policies of the larger Afrikaner parties came to predominate and the distinctiveness of the original South African Party was subsumed. The Afrikaner statesman, Louis Botha, formed and led the new government, while Merriman declined to accept a post in government.

== Electoral history ==
=== Cape House of Assembly elections ===
The final Cape parliamentary election in 1908 saw the party (shown in blue) win an overall majority.

Election	Party leader	Seats	+/–	Position	Result
1904	James Tennant Molteno	42 / 95	New	▼2nd	Opposition
1908	John X. Merriman	69 / 107	▲27	▲1st	Majority government
