= Katie H. R. Stuart =

South African-born British reformer (1862–1925)

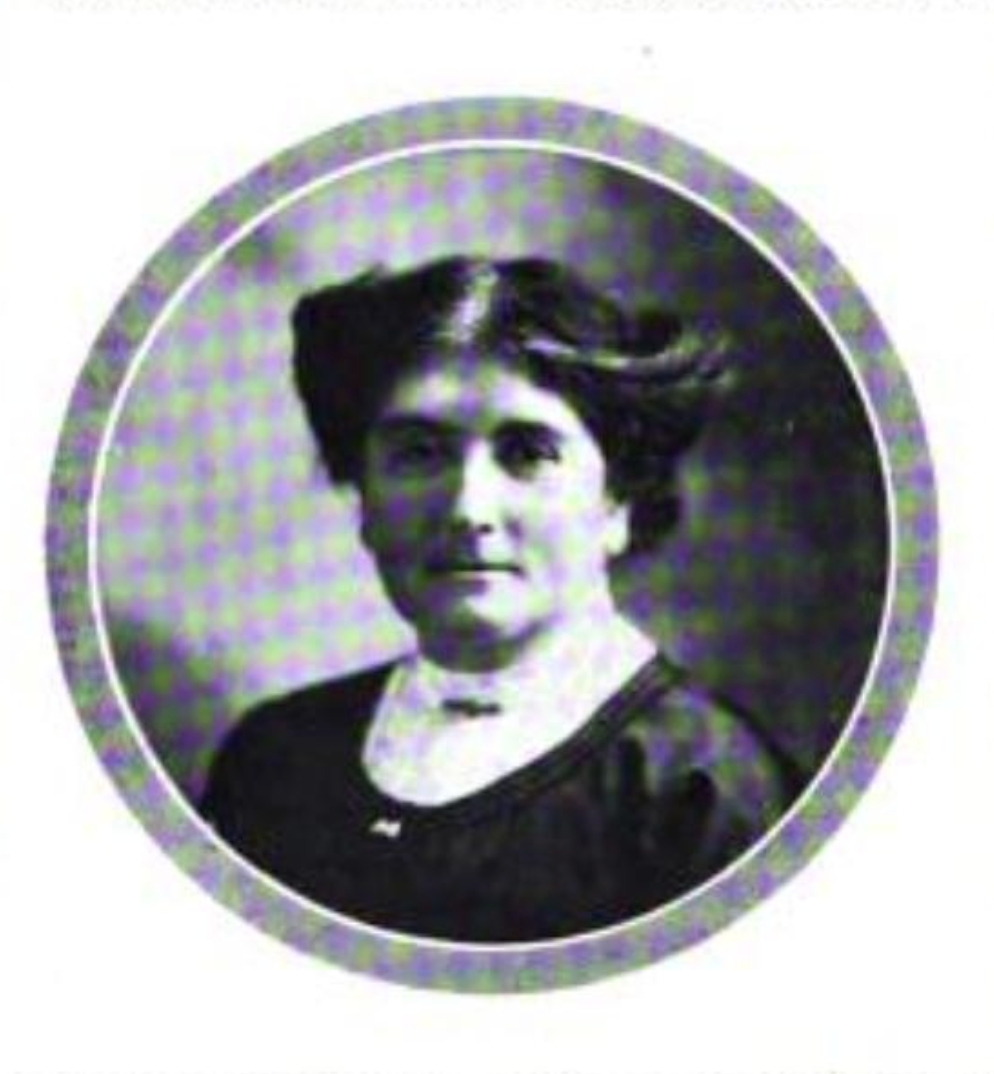
- Stuart in a 1913 publication
- Born: Katie Harriet Rebekah Findlay; November 4, 1862; Fraserburg, Cape Colony, South Africa
- Died: May 14, 1925 (aged 62); Cape Town, South Africa
- Occupations: Evangelist; temperance leader
- Organizations: Guild of Loyal Women of South Africa; Independent Order of Good Templars; Woman's Christian Temperance Union; YWCA; Women's Enfranchisement Association of the Union
- Spouse: Donald Stuart (m. 1883)
- Children: 1
- Relatives: Olive Schreiner; Oliver Schreiner; Theophilus Lyndall Schreiner; William Schreiner

Katie Harriet Rebekah Stuart (née Findlay; November 4, 1862 - May 14, 1925) was a South African evangelist and temperance leader. For many years, she assisted Theophilus Lyndall Schreiner in his temperance, evangelistic, and native work in South Africa. She preached in many churches, being one of the first South African women to take up public and platform work. She was an active member of the Guild of Loyal Women of South Africa (GLW), and its Delegate to England in 1900, where a collection was made of the first £1,500 for the care of the soldiers' graves. She was a keen worker in Good Templary (IOGT), having helped T. L. Schreiner to start many Lodges in South Africa, also in True Templary, of which society, which has about 13,000 members, she held the position of Right Worthy Secretary. Stuart served as President of the Sea Point Branch of the Woman's Christian Temperance Union (WCTU), and Superintendnt of Native and Coloured Work throughout South Africa. She was also vice-president of the YWCA. Stuart was a member of the South African Temperance Alliance, W.E.L., the People's League, the Naval League, British and Foreign Bible Society, and Clothing Guild.

== Early life and education ==
Katie Harriet Rebekah Findlay was born at Fraserburg, Cape Colony, South Africa, on November 4, 1862. Her father, John Findlay, was a merchant, Justice of the Peace, and for some time M.L.A. Her mother's maiden name was Catherine Whitby Schreiner. Katie was the eldest daughter in the family.

She was a relative of Senator T. L. Schreiner, the Rt. Hon. William Philip Schreiner, and Henrietta Stakesby Lewis.

She was educated at a private school at Cape Town. At the age of sixteen, owing to the failing health of her mother, Stuart left school in order to take charge of the family home at Balmoral, Frazerburg.

== Career ==
In January 1883, she married Dr. Donald Stuart, M.B., C.M., of Aberdeen University, District Surgeon, Fraserburg, Cape Province, of Kemnay, Aberdeenshire, Scotland.

When Dr. Stuart sacrificed his life for a dying man during the drought of 1884-85, Mrs. Stuart dedicated her own life to the welfare of the natives of South Africa.

Soon after her husband’s death, she went to live with her uncle, Senator T. L. Schreiner, taking the place of his sister Henrietta (née Schreiner) Stakesby Lewis as his assistant, and accompanying him for more than twenty years on evangelistic and temperance tours throughout South Africa.

For 40 years, Stuart was actively identified with the cause of temperance and prohibition in the Union of South Africa. Early becoming a member of the IOGT, she represented the Order, together with her uncle, T. L. Schreiner, and her aunt. Miss Henrietta Schreiner, at the Reunion Session of the two Supreme Lodges of the International Good Templars held in 1889 at Chicago, Illinois, where the retention of the degrees of Hope and Charity, as well as several other valuable privileges, was secured for the Order in South Africa.

At the conclusion of the Chicago session, Stuart accompanied her uncle on an eighteen months’ tour of Europe, Egypt, and the Holy Land, returning to South Africa in 1892. For eight succeeding years, they traversed the Cape Province together, conducting temperance mission campaigns.

Stuart was a co-founder of the Guild of Loyal Women of South Africa (GLW). During the Boer War (1899-1902), Stuart was sent as a representative of the GLW to Great Britain, where, with the assistance of Mrs. Macintosh, of Port Elizabeth, she raised a fund for the care of soldiers’ graves in South Africa. A sister, Alice Findlay, sympathized with the Boers, serving as nurse to Boer forces. Later, their brother, Fred, became censor in one of the Boer prisoner-of-war camps.

Stuart's earnest appeals for the creation of a closer bond between Great Britain and her colonial possessions culminated in the formation of the Victoria League.

In the Independent Order of True Templars (IOTT), of which her uncle was one of the founders, Stuart was also an active worker. In 1903, when Senator Schreiner became Right Worthy Templar of the Order, she was elected Right Worthy Secretary, which office she retained until her death.

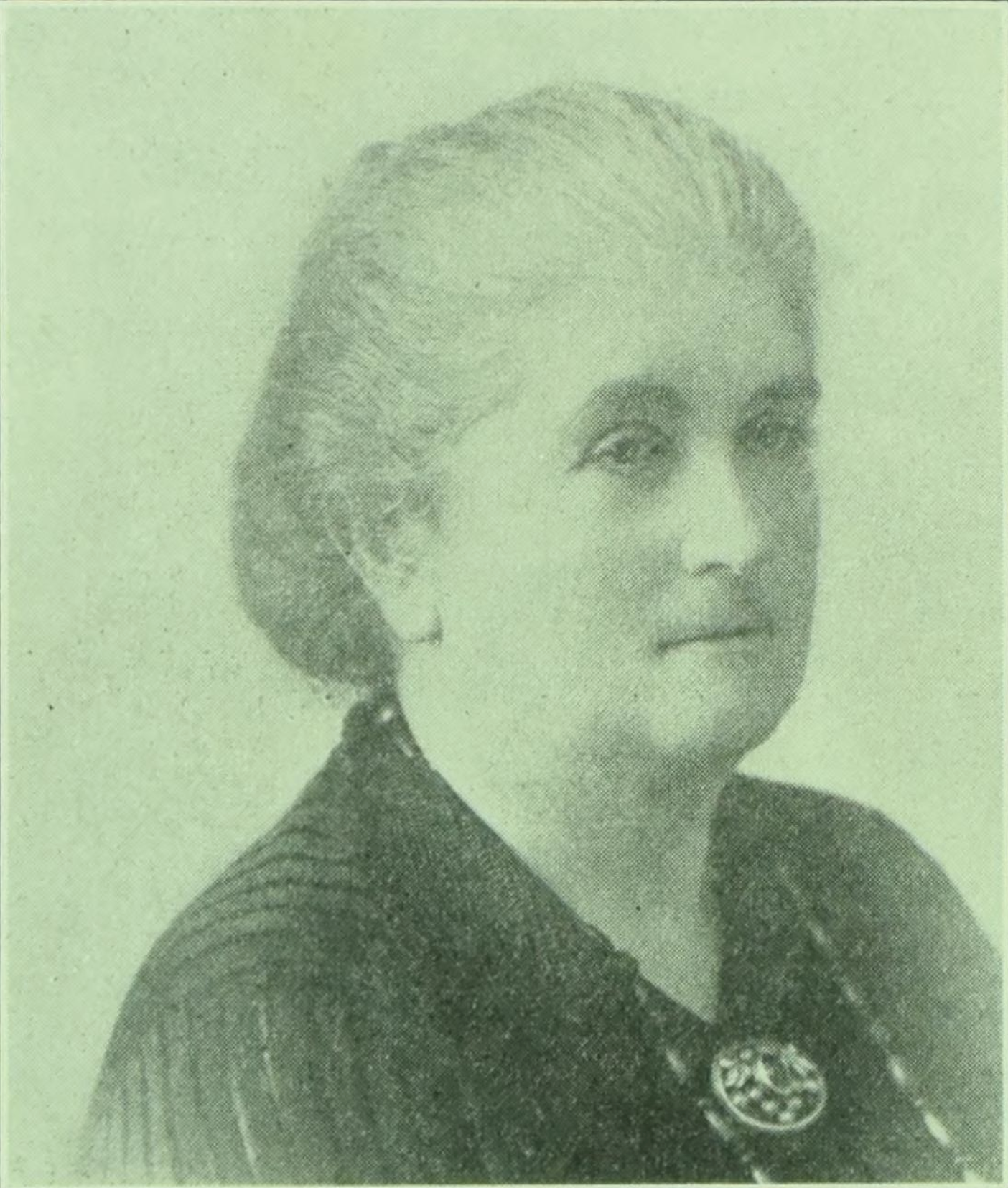
Stuart in a 1930 publication.

During her uncle’s first campaign for election to the Cape Parliament Stuart acted as his secretary. Afterward, she not only assisted him in his Parliamentary career, but resumed her temperance and mission-tours, which she continued at intervals until she was over sixty years of age. Her effectiveness was enhanced by the fact that she spoke Afrikaans fluently.

Upon the introduction into South Africa of the WCTU by Mary Clement Leavitt, Stuart was one of the first women to become enrolled. She later became president of the Sea Point WCTU, and also founded, and became Central president of, the Coloured and Native WCTU, a distinct body from, but affiliated with, the World's WCTU. As the official delegate from the Coloured and Native WCTU, she attended the World’s convention of the WCTU in London, England, where the report of her work in South Africa aroused enthusiasm.

Stuart was also involved in the South African Temperance Alliance. She was selected a member of the South African Council, the governing body of the Alliance, and at the time of her death, was honorary secretary of the Cape Alliance.

Up to within six months of her death, Stuart was engaged in active propaganda work. In 1923 and 1924, she toured the Union in the joint interests of the IOTT and the WCTU. She traveled 8,400 miles (13,500 km) by rail and 307 miles (494 km) by motor, visited 25 towns, held 221 meetings, and enrolled in various temperance societies 2,909 members, most of whom were students.

Wherever Stuart held meetings, she inculcated the practice of temperance physiology. She was unceasing in her efforts to secure legislation for scientific temperance instruction in the schools of the Union. In her latter years, she vigorously opposed separate political representation for natives, as proposed by the South African Native AfTairs Commission.

In honor of her aunt, Henrietta Stakesby Lewis, Stuart founded the Stakesby Lewis Hostels, three large institutions for colored and native people in Cape Town, conducted along YMCA and YWCA lines. One of these WAs known as the "Schreiner Memorial Home".

Stuart was known to write long letters filled with religious rhetoric, proclaimed emotions and feelings. Topics included family matters, religious convictions and activities, colonisation of Theo Schreiner, and references to disagreements with family.

== Personal life ==
Stuart lived for some time on the grounds of Buffelshoek, Eastern Cape.

Stuart's hobbies including gardening, poultry, outdoor exercise, and sports. She cycled from Mossel Bay to Port Elizabeth.

Since Stuart’s death, the work of the Schreiner family was carried on by her son, Will H. Stuart, a barrister, who, since 1915, represented the native constituency of Thembuland in the Parliament of the Union of South Africa, where he advocated native and temperance reforms.

Stuart had at least one grandson. Robert.

== Death and legacy ==
Katie Harriet Rebekah Findlay Stuart died May 14, 1925, at Victoria Court Flats, Cape Town, Cape Province.

Karel Schoeman published Stuart's biography in Quarterly Bulletin of the National Library of South Africa, in 2002.
