= Epworth School =

Location
- 95 Golf Road, Scottsville; Pietermaritzburg, KwaZulu-Natal; South Africa; 29°37′50″S 30°24′06″E

Information
- School type: Private & boarding
- Motto: Fida Humana Fortis
- Religious affiliation: Methodist church
- Established: 3 August 1898; 128 years ago
- Locale: Suburban
- School Executive: Dionne Redfern (High School Head), Reynard White (Executive Head)
- Exam board: IEB
- Staff: 120 full-time
- Grades: RRR–12
- Gender: Boys & Girls (Preparatory only); Girls (High School)
- Age: 3 to 18
- Enrollment: 740 pupils
- Language: English
- Schedule: 07:25 - 14:50
- Houses: Eagle; Falcon; Hawk; Kestrel
- Colours: Blue; Red; White
- School fees: R280,598 (boarding & tuition)
- Affiliations: ISASA
- Website: www.epworth.co.za

Epworth School is a private Christian School with a Methodist ethos, located on a 15 hectares (37 acres) campus in Scottsville in Pietermaritzburg in the KwaZulu-Natal province of South Africa. Epworth is an independent school (and a member of the Independent Schools Association of Southern Africa) catering for boys and girls in Grades RRR to 7 and girls from Grades 8 to 12.

The boarding establishment caters for girls-only boarding from Grades 8 to 12, on a termly, weekly or overnight boarding basis.

== Origin ==
In 1898 the Natal Witness carried an advertisement heralding the opening of a new school in "healthy and commodious premises". This had been requested by the Revd G W Rogers and Mr Justice Mason in a letter to Miss Emily Lowe and the Misses Emma and Charlotte Mason, who were staying together in London. The request was that Miss Lowe and Miss Emma Mason open a school in Maritzburg, as it was then called. This request was seconded by a number of Methodist laymen and ministers, the intention being that once the school was established the Wesleyan Church would take it over.

== History ==
Epworth School was founded in 1898 by Miss Emily Lowe and Miss Emma Mason. It was named after the birthplace in Lincolnshire of John Wesley, the founder of Methodism, the alternative suggestion of the name, "Victoria", after the reigning Queen Victoria having been rejected. The doors opened on 3 August 1898, with an enrolment of children of the early Natal settlers, in all, 45 pupils, 26 seniors and 19 kindergarten pupils.

== Notable alumnae ==
- Ethel Doidge, biologist
- Jane Porter (romance author)
- Jenny Schreiner, politician, anti-apartheid activist
- Jessica Haines, actress

== Notes and references ==
- Gunn, Mary; Codd, L. E. W. (1981). Botanical Exploration Southern Africa. CRC Press. ISBN 978-0-86961-129-6.
- Porter, Jane (2009). Easy on the Eyes. Grand Central Publishing. ISBN 978-0-446-55062-8.
