= Guild of Loyal Women =

The Guild of Loyal Women of South Africa was a voluntary organisation which identified, marked and maintained Second Boer War graves and military graveyards. Prominent founding members included the author and conservationist, Dorothea Fairbridge (1862–1931), and the temperance reformer, Katie Stuart (reformer).

== History ==
The Guild was founded in early 1900, and by June of that year had 3,000 members mainly in the Cape Colony. By the end of the year, it had branches in Natal and there were plans for branches in the Free State and the Transvaal. Although the members considered themselves non-political (in the sense of local party politics) as the name suggests the movement attracted members from those loyal to the British Crown, and it received royal patronage in December 1900. In 1901 it became affiliated with the Victoria League (now The Victoria League for Commonwealth Friendship).

== Cultural references ==
To The South African Guild of Loyal Women is a poem about the organisation written by Cicely Fox Smith (1882–1954).

== See also ==
- Commonwealth War Graves Commission
