= Dorothea Fairbridge =

South African author

- Born: 1862; Cape Town, Cape Colony
- Died: 25 August 1931; Cape Town, South Africa
- Occupations: Writer, conservationist, and a founder of Guild of Loyal Women

Dorothea Ann Fairbridge referred as Dora Fairbridge (1862 – 25 August 1931) was a South African author and co-founder of the Guild of Loyal Women.

== Biography ==
Fairbridge was the daughter of a distinguished lawyer, scholar and Cape Town parliamentarian, and a cousin of Kingsley Fairbridge (1885–1924; the Rhodesian poet and founder of the "Fairbridge Society"). She was educated in London and travelled widely.

As a highly respected third generation British settler, Fairbridge was a pillar of the colonial establishment. She met with British women from the upper social classes who traveled to South Africa from Britain before and during the Second Boer War. Fairbridge was a founding member of the Guild of Loyal Women, a charitable organisation that encouraged women in South Africa and supported the British Empire and its British Empire forces engaged in conflict. The guild ensured that the relatives of dead soldiers were contacted, and that the graves were properly marked and recorded. When the guild sent members to Britain to explain what they were doing to raise money, women who had the ear of the male British establishment formed the Victoria League to promote links between organisations within the British Empire. These women induced Violet Markham, Edith Lyttelton, Violet Cecil and Margaret, Countess of Jersey all of whom had met Dorothea Fairbridge socially.

After the Boer war, Fairbridge continued to support South Africa's integration into the British Empire. She sought to establish the Union of South Africa with a reconciled population and a shared sense of South African history. The Union of South Africa was established within a constitutional arrangement that encouraged close ties with the rest of the British Empire.

=== Works ===
Her works include:

- That Which Hath Been (1910) — a novel set in the early in the Cape's history.
- Piet of Italy (1913)
- The Torch Bearer (1915)
- History of South Africa (1917) — a school history
- Historic Houses of South Africa (1922) — a study of old Cape Dutch farmsteads
- The Uninvited (1926)
- Along Cape Roads (1928) — A travel guide
- The Pilgrim's Way in South Africa (1928) — a travel guide
- Historic Farms of South Africa (1932) — a study of old Cape Dutch farmsteads
- Gardens of South Africa (1934) — With some Chapters on Practical Gardening under South African Conditions and some Notes on the Cultivation of South African Wild Flowers

Fairbridge edited:

- Lady Anne Barnard's Cape diaries (1924)
