= Oliver Schreiner =

South African judge

The Honourable Oliver Deneys Schreiner MC, KC

Judge of the South African Appellate Division
- In office 1 January 1945 – 1960
- Appointed by: Jan Smuts

Judge of the Transvaal Provincial Division
- In office 1 August 1937 – 31 December 1944
- Appointed by: J. B. M. Hertzog

Personal details
- Born: 29 December 1890 Cape Town
- Died: 27 July 1980 (aged 89)
- Spouse: Edna Lambert Fincham
- Relations: Jenny Schreiner (granddaughter)
- Parent: William Philip Schreiner
- Education: Rondebosch Boys' High School
- Alma mater: South African College; Trinity College, Cambridge

Oliver Deneys Schreiner MC KC (29 December 1890 – 27 July 1980), was a judge of the Appellate Division of the Supreme Court of South Africa. One of the most renowned South African judges, he was passed over twice for the position of Chief Justice of South Africa for political reasons. He was later described by Ellison Kahn as "the greatest Chief Justice South Africa never had".

== Early life and education ==
Schreiner was born in Cape Town in 1890, the son of William Philip Schreiner, the Prime Minister of the Cape Colony during the Boer War, and his wife, Frances, a sister of President F. W. Reitz. The author Olive Schreiner was his aunt. The reformer, Katie Stuart, was his niece.

Schreiner attended the Rondebosch Boys' High School, the South African College School (SACS), before going to the South African College (now the University of Cape Town), where he was the admired president of the Debating Union. An excellent student, he "could have had the Rhodes Scholarship for the asking", but understood, in the light of Rhodes's involvement in the Jameson Raid and subsequent fallout with William Schreiner, that "no Schreiner took such a gift from such a man". Instead, Schreiner went up to Trinity College, Cambridge to read Law. Like his father, who had also studied at Cambridge, Schreiner had a brilliant academic career, topping the list for Part I of the Law Tripos in 1912, winning the George Long Prize in Roman Law, and receiving a Trinity Senior Scholarship. In 1915 he was granted his BA in absentia and in 1916, he was elected to a fellowship of Trinity.

His studies were interrupted by the First World War: he was commissioned into the British Army, and served with the Northamptonshire Regiment and the South Wales Borderers. he was wounded in the right arm at Trônes Wood during the Battle of the Somme, and received the Military Cross. After recovering from his injuries, he was sent to Mesopotamia, but his ship was torpedoed en route. He was demobilized with the rank of Captain.

== Legal career ==
After the war Schreiner completed his legal studies and was called to the English bar at the Inner Temple, completing his pupillage under Wilfred Greene and Geoffrey Lawrence. He was called to the Transvaal bar in 1920 and set up a practice in Johannesburg, dealing primarily in commercial arbitration, white collar crime and being recognised as a specialist in procedure. He also lectured on the law of torts and crime at the Faculty of Law of University College, Johannesburg (now University of the Witwatersrand), then in its early days: the Law School is today named in his honour. He had a roaring civil practice, and took silk as a King's Counsel in 1935. In the 1920s, he was approached by Jan Hofmeyr to enter politics, but declined to do so.

On 15 February, he was appointed an acting judge of the Transvaal Provincial Division, and was appointed to a permanent position on the court on 1 August 1937. As a trial judge, Schreiner was said to be quiet and polite, but a sharp questioner, and looked primarily after Chamber work. During the Second World War, he presided over a special court in charge of trying cases of sabotage and hampering the war effort. He also presided over the special court which tried Robey Leibbrandt and others for high treason; the judgment ran to 70,000 words and took seven hours to be delivered.

On 1 January 1945, he was promoted to the Appellate Division of the Supreme Court of South Africa, where he served until his retirement in 1960. Initially he heard primarily civil appeals from trial courts as well as tax appeals, but later on exclusively heard second appeals as well as petitions against the executive

During the Coloured Vote Crisis, Schreiner steadfastly refused to endorse the attempts of the Nationalist government to remove Coloured voters from the Cape Province's roll. Finally, after the Appellate Division had been packed with pliant judges, it approved the government's reconstitution of the Senate. Schreiner was the lone dissenter.

=== Passed over for the Chief Justiceship ===
Schreiner was twice passed over for appointment as Chief Justice, despite being the most senior appellate judge (tradition dictated that the appointment should go to the most senior appellate judge). On the first occasion he was superseded by Henry Allan Fagan, who accepted the appointment with reluctance; although it was obvious to both that Schreiner was being punished by the government for his role in the coloured vote crisis. Initially the judges of the Court had, at the suggestion of outgoing Chief Justice Albert van der Sandt Centlivres, tried to reach an agreement that they would all refuse appointment, so that the government would be forced to appoint Schreiner. But this plan failed when notorious National Party favourite L. C. Steyn failed to agree. Fagan therefore accepted the Chief Justiceship with misgivings, after consulting with Schreiner, so that Steyn would not be appointed.

When Fagan retired two years later, Schreiner was again passed over, this time losing out to Steyn. Schreiner was later described by Ellison Kahn as "the greatest Chief Justice South Africa never had".

Politically, Ellison Kahn classifies Schreiner as a traditional Cape liberal: he opposed racism, and in old age refused to sit on whites-only bus seats. In 1970, he refused to be renominated as President of the Cripple Care Association of the Transvaal because its constitution had been amended to restrict membership to whites only.

== Honours and awards ==
After his retirement he served on the University of the Witwatersrand Council and as president of the South African Institute of Race Relations. A long-serving member of the Council of the University of the Witwatersrand (Wits) he was elected unopposed as Chancellor of the university, serving from 1962 to 1974. He also sat on the appellate courts of various African territories. He was awarded three honorary doctorates: from the University of Cape Town (1958), Witwatersrand (1961) and Rhodes (1963). In 1967, he delivered the Hamlyn Lectures at Cambridge. The main building at the University of the Witwatersrand Law School is named for him.
