= Progressive Party (Cape Colony) =

- Leaders: Cecil Rhodes, The Viscount Milner, Gordon Sprigg
- Founded: 1890
- Dissolved: 1910
- Succeeded by: Unionist Party
- Headquarters: Cape Town
- Ideology: Liberalism; Protectionism; Pro-Imperialism
- Political position: Centre-right

The Progressive Party of the Cape Colony was a political party in the Cape Parliament that was primarily composed of and supported by white immigrants to the Cape. It supported pro-imperialist policies, and was in power from 1900 until 1908.

== History ==
The Progressive Party formed in the late 1890s from the pro-imperialist politics of politicians such as Cecil John Rhodes, Alfred Milner and John Gordon Sprigg.

They initially formed the opposition to the government of Prime Minister William Philip Schreiner, after they lost the 1898 election to him. However, the Progressives came to power on 18 June 1900 under Prime Minister John Gordon Sprigg, and later under Prime Minister Leander Starr Jameson.

They lost power on 2 February 1908, to the opposition South African Party under John X. Merriman. After this election the Progressives renamed themselves the "Union Party".

The similarly named "Progressive Movement" started in the neighbouring Transvaal in 1891 as a movement of wealthy foreign immigrants (or "Uitlanders") who opposed the Afrikaner government of the Transvaal. Just before Union, they became the "Progressive Association of the Transvaal". They won 21 of the 69 seats in the 1907 elections, losing to Het Volk Party which won 39 seats.

After the creation of the Union of South Africa, the Union Party of the Cape, the Progressive Association of the Transvaal and the Constitutional Party of the Orange Free State merged to form the Unionist Party.

== See also ==
- Eastern Cape Separatist League
