= Jack Simons (academic) =

South African university academic and activist

- Born: Harold Jack Simons; 1 February 1907; Riversdale, Cape Colony
- Died: 22 July 1995 (aged 88); Cape Town, South Africa
- Spouse: Ray Esther Alexander
- Children: Mary Simons; Tanya Barben; Johan Simons

Academic background
- Education: PhD
- Alma mater: London School of Economics
- Thesis: Crime and Punishment in South Africa with Comparative Studies (1935)

Jack Simons (1 February 1907 – 22 July 1995) was a South African university academic and anti-apartheid activist.

== Early life ==
Harold Jack Simons was born in 1907 in Riversdale, Cape Colony to father Hyman Simons, who had come to South Africa with Cecil Rhodes and Gertrude Morkel a teacher. He matriculated in 1924 and joined a law firm as an articled clerk, qualifying with a law certificate. In 1926, he moved to Pretoria where he joined the civil service in the Auditor General's and Justice Department. Studying part-time, he obtained a Bachelor of Law degree from the University of South Africa and with a scholarship obtained a Master of Political Science degree from the Transvaal University College in 1931, the subject being the South African penal system. Obtaining a further scholarship, he attended the London School of Economics in 1932 and obtained a PhD in 1935, its subject compared the penal systems in South Africa, Kenya and South Rhodesia. During his travels in Europe he would see the rise of Fascism, Nazism as well as the Black Shirts in the United Kingdom, a civil war in Spain, organised Marxist study groups and would later join the British Communist Party in 1933.

== Academic career ==
He returned to South Africa in 1937 and joined as a lecturer at the University of Cape Town (UCT) in Native Law and Administration and would later change the departments name to the Department of Comparative African Government and Law. In 1937 he was introduced to the African National Congress (ANC) when he attended their national conference. He and his future wife, as well as Eli Weinberg, would help revive the South African Communist Party (SACP) after years of turmoil and expulsions from the party in the early thirties and which would see the appointment of Moses Kotane as its general-secretary in 1939. In 1941, he married Ray Alexander who had introduced him to trade unionism.

From 1937 to 1947, he conducted anthropological work in the Cape township of Langa and contributed to political journalism and academic articles. He and members of the SACP were arrested in 1946 over their participation in the African miners strike and won the case. The year 1948 was turning point in South African politics with the National Party winning the 1948 election and their policy of Apartheid. With the introduction of the Suppression of Communism Act in 1950, the Simons and SACP voted to officially dissolve themselves but by 1953 were an underground movement. In 1956 Treason Trial he would assist Bram Fischer in the defence of the 156 people arrested for treason. He was arrested in 1960 after the Sharpeville massacre. With assistance of UCT staff and students, he was released and allowed to lecture but not publish. Simons would be banned from lecturing in 1964, anywhere in South Africa so in 1965, he, his wife and son would leave South Africa for exile overseas leaving behind his two daughters who were still at university.

== Exile ==
He would become a research fellow at University of Manchester in 1965 where he would complete his book, African Women: Their Legal Status in South Africa. By 1967 he and his wife had settled in Lusaka, Zambia where he joined the University of Zambia as a reader then as professor and researcher in Political Science and Sociology and retired in 1975. In 1969, he attended the Morogoro Conference when the ANC membership was opened to all South African races and was invited to become a member of the organisation.

Oliver Tambo suggested that Simons run courses in History and the National Democratic Revolution for Umkhonto we Sizwe (MK), the armed wing of the ANC based in the Angolan camps. He would be based there twice. First in 1977-78 when camps contain arrivals that went into exile after 1976 Soweto Riots and again from December 1978 to March 1979. It would become known as the "University of the South". The ANC camp at Novo Catengue in Angola would be subject to a bombing attack by the South African Air Force, though he and his students were not present that day. He would also teach at the Solomon Mahlangu Freedom College in Tanzania.

In 1986 a two-year study by a committee of ANC lawyers and political scientists worked on a document on constitutional guidelines for a future multiparty democracy in South Africa that would expand on the principles of the Freedom Charter, that saw Simons as its chairman. This document, released in 1988, would be guideline for future negotiations between the ANC and the South African government.

== Later life ==
Simons and his wife would return to South Africa in 1990 soon after Nelson Mandela's release and would see the first free election in South Africa in 1994. He was given an honorary doctorate in Law from the University of Cape Town in 1994. He died in July 1995 and was survived by his wife and three children.
