= Olive Schreiner =

South African author and activist (1855–1920)

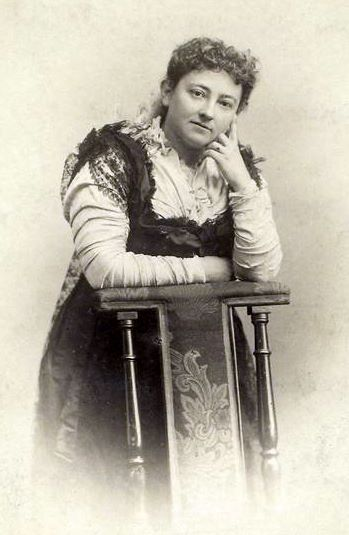
- Born: Olive Emilie Albertina Schreiner; 24 March 1855; Wittebergen Reserve, Cape Colony (in present-day Lesotho)
- Died: 11 December 1920 (aged 65); Wynberg, South Africa
- Occupations: Novelist, suffragist, political activist
- Relatives: S. C. Cronwright-Schreiner (Husband); Frederick Samuel Schreiner (brother); Theophilus Lyndall Schreiner (brother); William Schreiner (brother); Helen Schreiner (sister); Henrietta Stakesby Lewis (sister); Oliver Schreiner (nephew); Katie Stuart (niece)
- Writing career
- Notable works: The Story of an African Farm, Woman and Labour

Signature
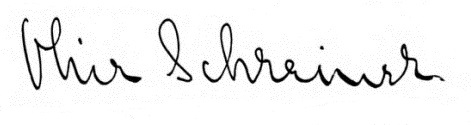

Olive Emilie Albertina Schreiner (24 March 1855 – 11 December 1920) was a South African author, anti-war campaigner and intellectual. She is best remembered today for her novel The Story of an African Farm (1883), which has been highly acclaimed. It deals boldly with such contemporary issues as agnosticism, existential independence, individualism, the professional aspirations of women, and the elemental nature of life on the colonial frontier.

Schreiner is also known for her later novel, From Man To Man Or Perhaps Only (1926), published posthumously. She had not completed its revisions before her death. The first edition was produced by her husband, Samuel Cronwright-Schreiner. It was re-edited and published by the University of Cape Town Press (edited and introduced by Dorothy Driver). This edition corrects previous errors and provides another ending to the novel, in Schreiner's own words, in addition to her husband's summary. From Man to Man or Perhaps Only was said by Schreiner to be her favourite among her novels. From exploring white women's confinement to domestic life in colonial-era South Africa, the novel eventually expands its gaze to include black women and girls, whose presence gradually informs the central character's struggle to re-create herself and educate her children against the racism and sexism of the period.

== Biography ==
Karel Schoeman, a historian, and authority on Schreiner in South Africa, wrote that she was an outstanding figure in a South African context. He summarises the basic pattern of her life as follows, noting her periods of living out of the country:

From a chronological viewpoint, Olive Schreiner's life shows an interesting pattern. After she spent the first twenty-five thereof in South Africa ... she was in England for more than seven years, and also lived during this time in Europe. After this, she lived in South Africa for twenty-four years, the time of her friendship with Rhodes, the Anglo-Boer war, and her growing involvement in issues like racism and the lot of women, after which another exile followed in England for seven years; it was only shortly before her death in 1920 that she returned to South Africa.

=== Early life ===
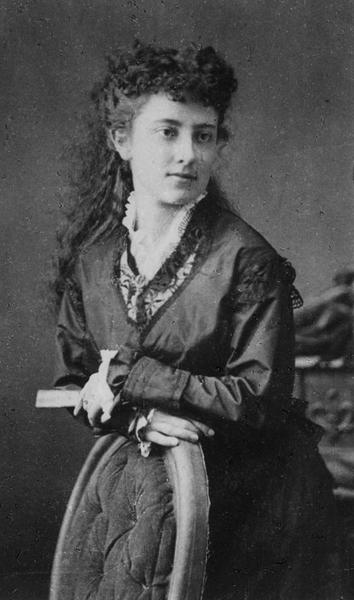

Olive Emilie Albertina Schreiner was the ninth of twelve children born to a missionary couple at the Wesleyan Missionary Society station at Wittebergen in the Eastern Cape, near Herschel in South Africa. Her parents, Gottlob Schreiner and Rebecca (née Lyndall), married in England in 1837. She was named after her three older brothers, Oliver (1848–1854), Albert (1843–1843) and Emile (1852–1852), each of whom died before she was born. Her eldest brother, Frederick Samuel (1841–1901), obtained a BA at London University and founded New College in Eastbourne in 1877. He remained as headmaster until late 1897, but continued to run the junior school until 1901. He died in 1901 at the Grand Hotel in Eastbourne and was interred in the town.

When Olive was six, her father Gottlob transferred to Healdtown in the Eastern Cape to run the Wesleyan training institute there. As with so many of his other projects, he could not manage the responsibility and was expelled in disgrace for trading against missionary regulations. He was forced to make his own living for the first time in his life and tried a business venture. Again, he failed and was insolvent within a year. The family lived in abject poverty as a result.

When Schreiner was nine, her youngest sister Helen ("Ellie") died, and this had a profound effect on the survivor's outlook. Ellie was the twelfth and last child; she died at seventeen months (1864-1865). Schreiner dedicated the 'Prelude' of From Man to Man to Ellie, as well as to her own daughter, who died shortly after her birth.

In a number of letters, Schreiner discusses Ellie's death as a key turning point in her life. In a letter to John T. Lloyd of 1892, for instance, Schreiner commented:

I think I first had this feeling with regard to death clearly when my favourite little sister died when I was nine years old. I slept with her little body until it was buried, & after that, I used to sit for hours by her grave ... & it was as impossible for me then, as it is impossible for me now, to accept the ordinary doctrine that she was living on somewhere without a body.

When her older brother, "Theo" (Theophilus Schreiner; 1844–1920), was appointed as headmaster in Cradock in 1867, Schreiner and two of their siblings went to live with him. She also attended his school, where she received formal education for the first time. But she was no happier in Cradock than she had been in Wittebergen or Healdtown. Her siblings were very religious, but Olive had already questioned the Christianity of her parents, and it was the cause of many arguments that she had with her family. Consequently, when Theo and another brother left Cradock for the diamond fields of Griqualand West, Olive chose to become a governess. On the way to her first post at Barkly East, she met Willie Bertram, who shared her views of religion and who lent her a copy of Herbert Spencer's First Principles. This text was to have a profound impact on her. While rejecting religious creeds and doctrine, Spencer also argued for a belief in an Absolute that lay beyond the scope of human knowledge and conception. This belief was founded in the unity of nature and a teleological universe, both of which Olive was to appropriate for herself in her attempts to create a morality free of organised religion.

Another factor was that she was somewhat unconventional in her relationships, for she was uncertain as to how to relate sexually to her male employers in many cases, and men in general. In his study of Schreiner's character, Karel Schoeman writes:

As far as Olive's sexuality is concerned there is little known, because however open she was [as a woman] for her time, this was merely relative, and the information that may be used as the primary evidence in this regard, is included and appeared as an addendum in the case studies that appear in [Havelock] Ellis's Studies in the Psychology of Sex.

And this person, who Schoeman identifies strongly with Schreiner in agreement with other researchers, is described by Ellis as ...

[Someone who]... from girlhood experienced erotic day-dreams, imagining love-stories of which she herself was the heroine; the climax of these stories has developed with her own knowledge of sexual matters ... She regards herself as very passionate ... but her sexual emotions appear to have developed very slowly and have been somewhat intellectualised.

During this time she met Julius Gau, to whom she became engaged although their engagement did not last long. She returned to live with her parents and then with her brothers. She read widely and began writing seriously. She started Undine at this time. As in the case of her later husband, Cronwright, she may have been attracted to Gau, as to other men, for his dominant personality, maturity, and physicality:

It is obvious that she felt attracted to the towering and even possibly hypnotic personality of Gau, like that of Undine [to the character] Blair, and mistook the physical attraction for love ... [writing about this] "I was once partly in love when I was barely 15, and have never had the smallest return of that feeling though I have always desired it ...".

However, her brothers' financial situation soon deteriorated, as diamonds became increasingly difficult to find. Olive had no choice but to resume her transient lifestyle, moving between various households and towns, until she returned briefly to her parents in 1874. It was there that she had the first of the asthma attacks that would plague her for the rest of her life. Since her parents were no more financially secure than before and because of her ill-health, Olive was forced to resume working to support them. Over the next few years, she accepted the position of governess at a number of farms, most notably the Fouchés, who provided inspiration for certain aspects of The Story of an African Farm, which she published under the pseudonym "Ralph Iron", as well as a small collection of stories and allegories called Dream Life and Real Life.

=== England and Continental Europe ===
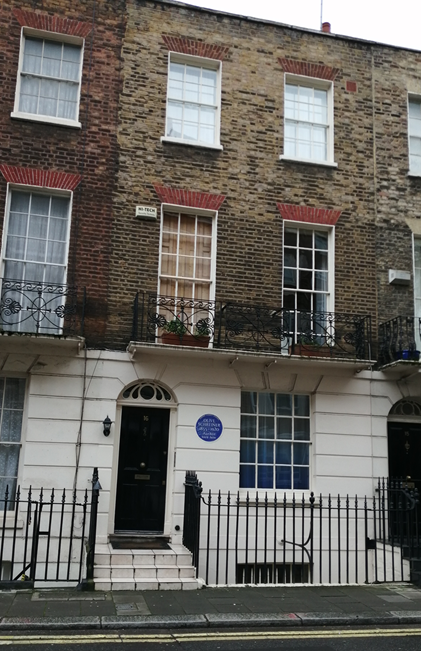
16 Portsea Place, London W2, one of the several lodging places of Olive Schreiner while in London

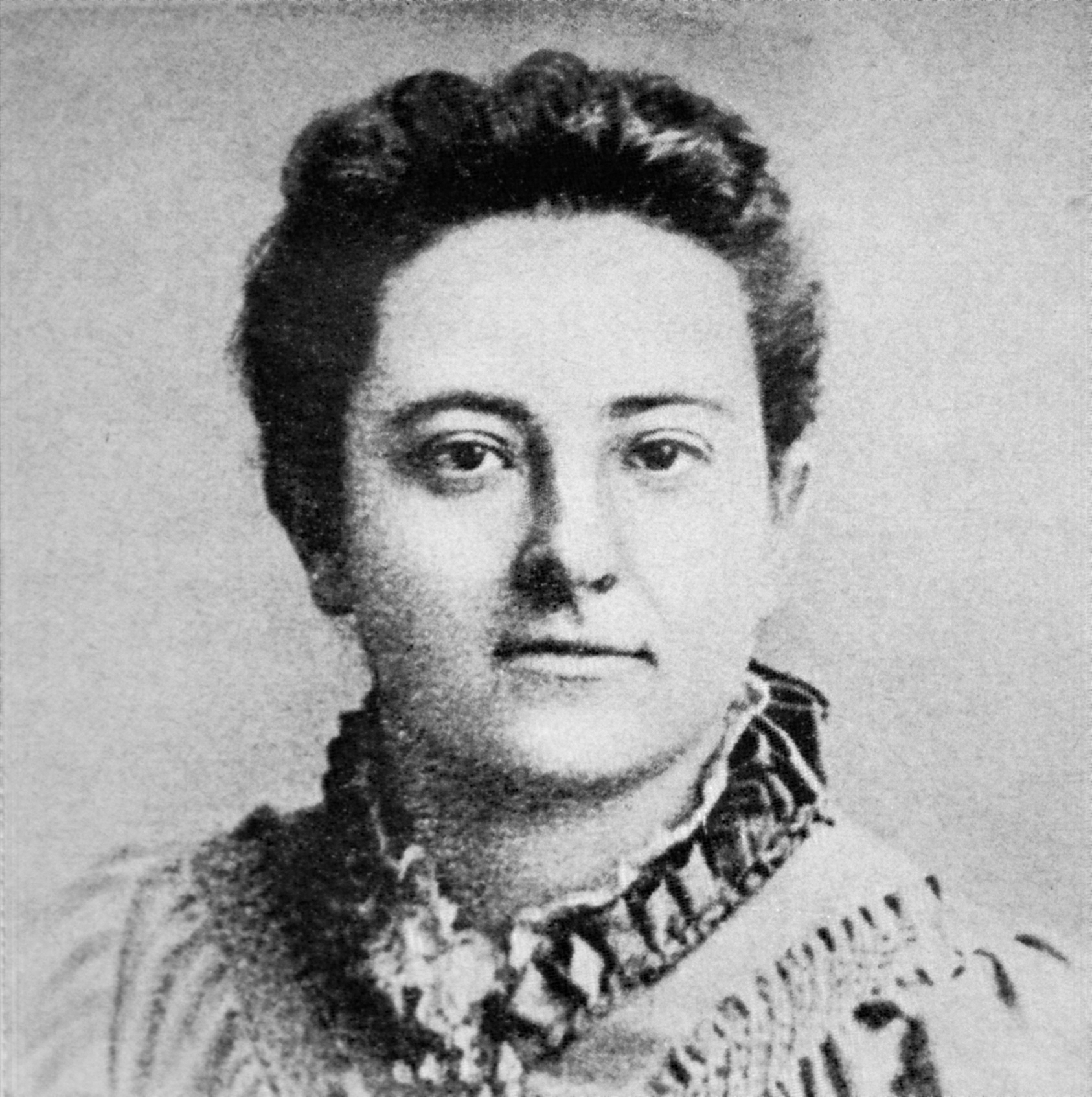
Olive Schreiner in 1889 at Menton, France

However, Olive's real ambitions did not lie in the direction of writing. She had always wanted to be a doctor but had never had enough money to pay for the training. Undaunted, she decided that she would be a nurse as that did not require her to pay anything. By 1880, she had saved enough money for an overseas trip, and she applied to the Royal Infirmary of Edinburgh in Scotland. In 1881, she travelled to Southampton in England. Once there, she was never to realise her dream of becoming a medical practitioner, as her ill-health prevented her from completing any form of training or studying. She was forced to concede that writing would and could be her only work in life. Despite that, she still had a passion to heal society's ills and set out to do with her pen what she could not with pills. Her Story of an African Farm was acclaimed for the manner in which it tackled the issues of its day, ranging from agnosticism to the treatment of women. It was also the cause of one of her most significant and long-lasting friendships, as the renowned sexologist Havelock Ellis wrote to her about her novel. Their relationship soon developed beyond intellectual debate to a genuine source of support for Schreiner.

She finally met Ellis in 1884 when she went with him to a meeting of the Progressive Organisation, a group for freethinkers to discuss political and philosophical views. This was one of a number of radical discussion groups to which she was to belong and which brought her into contact with many important socialists of the time. Another friendship that would prove to be influential was with Edward Carpenter, the founder Socialist and gay rights activist, which, as Stephen Gray shows, remains hardly explored.

In addition to the Progressive Organisation, she also attended meetings of the Fellowship of the New Life and Karl Pearson's Men and Women's Club, where she was insistent on the critical importance of woman's equality and the need to consider men as well as women when looking at gender relationships. However, her own relationships with men were anything but happy. She had refused a proposal from her doctor, Bryan Donkin, but he was irritatingly persistent in his suit of her. To make matters worse, despite her reservations about Karl Pearson and her intentions just to remain his friend, she soon conceived an attraction for him. He did not reciprocate her feelings, preferring Elizabeth Cobb. In London, Schreiner often found herself at odds with society's expectations of "respectable behaviour". Edward Carpenter described her as "a pretty woman of apparently lady-like origin who did not wear a veil and seldom wore gloves, and who talked and laughed even in the streets quite naturally". She clashed with a succession of landlords over her frequent male visitors, and once, outside her lodgings at 16 Portsea Place near Marble Arch, she was nearly arrested as a prostitute.

In 1886, she left England for Continental Europe under something of a cloud, travelling between Switzerland, France, and Italy before returning to England. During this time, she was tremendously productive, working on From Man to Man and publishing numerous allegories. She also worked on an introduction to Mary Wollstonecraft's A Vindication of the Rights of Women.

=== Return to South Africa ===
Given the situation in England, it is perhaps not surprising that Schreiner chose to return to South Africa, sailing back to Cape Town in 1889. The return home was unsettling for her – she felt extremely alienated from the people around her, but at the same time experienced a great affinity for the land itself. In an attempt to reconnect with her surroundings, she became increasingly involved in local politics and produced a series of articles on the land and people around her, published posthumously as Thoughts on South Africa. Through her work with local politics she became intimate friends with Emily Hobhouse, Jessie Rose-Innes and Elizabeth Maria Molteno, influential women activists with similar opinions on civil and women's rights.

Her involvement with Cape politics led her into an association with Cecil John Rhodes, with whom she would soon become disillusioned and about whom she would write her bitterly satirical allegory Trooper Peter Halket of Mashonaland. This disillusionment began with his support of the "strop bill" that would allow black and coloured servants to be flogged for relatively small offences.

Her opposition to the "strop bill" also brought her into contact with Samuel Cronwright, a politically active farmer. They were of the same mind on the "Native Question" and on Rhodes, and Schreiner soon fell in love with him. During a brief visit to England in 1893, she discussed with her friends the possibility of marrying him, although she was concerned that she would find marriage restrictive. She put aside these doubts, however, and they were married in 1894, after which they settled at Cronwright's farm.

The next few years were difficult and unsettled ones for them. Schreiner's worsening health forced the couple to move constantly, while her first and only child, a daughter, died within a day. This loss was worsened by the fact that all her other pregnancies would end in miscarriages. However, she found solace in work, publishing a pamphlet with her husband on the political situation in 1896 and Trooper Peter Halket of Mashonaland the next year. Both of these isolated her from her family and the people around her, and she experienced long spells of loneliness during this period of her life.

In 1898, the couple moved to Johannesburg for health reasons. In the aftermath of the Jameson Raid, they were seen as the champions of the Republican cause in the face of the inevitable war between Boer and British. Schreiner tried to persuade South African officials to turn away from the path of war, and, when that failed, wrote The South African Question by an English South African in an attempt to open the English public's eyes to the reality of the situation. That was equally unsuccessful, but Schreiner was undaunted.

Throughout the war, she continued to defend Boer interests and argue for peace, as did her brother William Philip Schreiner, even though she was suffering physically and psychologically and all her efforts only met with ridicule. As a means of distraction, she began reworking the "sex book" she had started in England into Woman and Labour, which is the best expression of her characteristic concerns with socialism and gender equality. Driven by her prophetic vision of a non-racist, non-sexist South Africa, during the Boer War Schreiner lived in the tiny hamlet of Hanover, virtually a British army camp.

The last few years of Schreiner's life were marked by ill-health and an increasing sense of isolation. Despite this, she still engaged in politics and was determined to make her mark on a new constitution, especially through works like Closer Union. In this polemic, she argued for more rights not only for blacks but also for women. She also joined the newly founded Cape Branch of the Women's Enfranchisement League in 1907, becoming its vice-president. However, she refused to lend her support to it any longer when other branches wished to exclude black women from the vote.

=== Final days ===
When Woman and Labour was finally published in 1911, Schreiner was severely ill, her asthma worsened by attacks of angina. Two years later, she sailed alone to England for treatment but was trapped there by the outbreak of World War I. During this time, her primary interest was in pacifism – she was in contact with Gandhi and other prominent activists like Emily Hobhouse and Elizabeth Maria Molteno – and she started a book on war, which was abbreviated and published as The Dawn of Civilisation. This was the last book she was to write. After the war, she returned home to the Cape, where she died in her sleep in a boarding house in 1920. She was buried later in Kimberley. After the death of her husband, Samuel Cronwright, her body was exhumed, and along with her baby, dog and husband, she was reburied atop Buffelskop mountain, on the farm known as Buffelshoek, near Cradock, in the Eastern Cape.

== Selected works ==
- The Story of an African Farm, 1883 (as "Ralph Iron")
- Dreams, 1890
- Dream Life and Real Life, 1893
- The Political Situation in Cape Colony, 1895 (with S. C. Cronwright-Schreiner)
- Three Dreams in a Desert. Under a Mimosa-Tree, 1897
- Trooper Peter Halket of Mashonaland, 1897
- The South African Question. By an English South African, 1899
- An English South African Woman's View of the Situation, a critique on the Transvaal difficulty from the pro-Boer position, 1899
- So Here Then are Dreams, 1901
- A Letter on the Jew, 1906
- Closer Union: a Letter on South African Union and the Principles of Government, 1909
- Woman and Labour, 1911
- Woman and War, 1914
- Who Knocks at the Door?, 1918
- The Dawn of Civilisation, 1921
- Thoughts on South Africa, 1923. Posthumously
- Stories, Dreams and Allegories, 1923. Posthumously
- From Man to Man or Perhaps Only, 1926. Posthumously
- Undine, 1929. Posthumously

== Correspondence ==
The Olive Schreiner Letters Online database is a collection of over 5,000 extant letters written to or from Schreiner. The letters cover a diverse range of topics from South African political history, 'New Women' writers, international social movements, to feminist social theory. The OSLO edition provides; full diplomatic transcriptions, including omissions, insertions, and 'mistakes'; extensive full-text search facilities; topic collections of Schreiner letters; a 'dramatis personae' providing bibliographical information on Schreiner's correspondents and many other people mentioned in her letters; new collections of letters as they become available; detailed information on all Schreiner's publications, including in journals and newspapers, as well as books; and downloadable publications from the OSLO research team.

== Audio book ==
"In a far off world"

- Story of an African Farm

== Recent scholarship ==
- Carolyn Burdett's Olive Schreiner (Oxford University Press, 2013) ISBN 0746310935, 9780746310939
- Liz Stanley, Andrea Salter & Helen Dampier (2013), 'Olive Schreiner, Epistolary Practices and Microhistories, Cultural and Social History, 10:4, 577–597.
- Stanley, L., Salter, A., & Dampier, H. (2013), 'The Work of Making and the Work it Does: Cultural Sociology and 'Bringing- Into-Being' the Cultural Assemblage of the Olive Schreiner Letters' in Cultural Sociology 7(3), 287–302.
- 'I Just Express My Views & Leave Them to Work': Olive Schreiner as a Feminist Protagonist in a Masculine Political Landscape with Figures' by Liz Stanley and Helen Dampier. Published in Gender and History, Vol. 24, Issue 3 (November 2012).
- Helen Dampier's article, 'Re-Readings of Olive Schreiner's Letters to Karl Pearson: Against Closure', OSLP Working Papers on Letters, Letterness & Epistolary Networks No 3, University of Edinburgh, pp. 46–71
- 'Olive Schreiner Globalising Social Inquiry: A Feminist Analytics of Globalization' by Stanley, L., Dampier, H., & Salter, A. in The Sociological Review (2010) 58(4), 656–679.
- '"Her letters cut are generally nothing of interest": the Heterotopic Persona of Olive Schreiner and the Alterity-Persona of Cronwright-Schreiner', an article by Liz Stanley and Andrea Salter in English in Africa, Volume 36, Number 2, 1 October 2009, pp. 7–30(24).
- Ann Heilmans' New Woman Strategies: Sarah Grand, Olive Schreiner, and Mona Caird (Manchester University Press, 2004) ISBN 0719057590, 9780719057595
- Article by John Kucich: 'Olive Schreiner, Masochism, and Omnipotence: Strategies of a Preoedipal Politics' in Novel: A Forum on Fiction (2002) 36 (1): 79.
- Liz Stanley's article, 'Shadows lying across her pages: epistolary aspects of reading 'the eventful I' in Olive Schreiner's letters' in Journal of European Studies (2002).
- Olive Schreiner and the Progress of Feminism: Evolution, Gender and Empire by Carolyn Burdett (Springer, 2001) ISBN 0230598978, 9780230598973
- Paula M. Krebs' article, 'Olive Schreiner's Racialization of South Africa' in Victorian Studies Vol. 40, No. 3 (Spring, 1997), pp. 427–444 (18 pages).
- Fictions of the Female Self: Charlotte Bronte, Olive Schreiner, Katherine Mansfield by Ruth Parkin-Gounelas (Springer 1991) ISBN 0230378250, 9780230378254
- Mark James Perry's thesis The life of Olive Schreiner: a psychobiography. University of the Free State (31 July 2012).

== See also ==
- Olive Schreiner Prize - an award named in her honour
- Heretics, a collection of essays by G.K. Chesterton published in 1905, who praises her as "a fierce, brilliant, and realistic novelist... Her literary kinship is with the pessimistic fiction of the continent; with the novelists whose very pity is cruel. Olive Schreiner is the one English colonial who is not conventional" in his diatribe on English Colonization.
