= William Schreiner =

Prime Minister of the Cape Colony from 1898 to 1900

The Right Honourable William Philip Schreiner KC
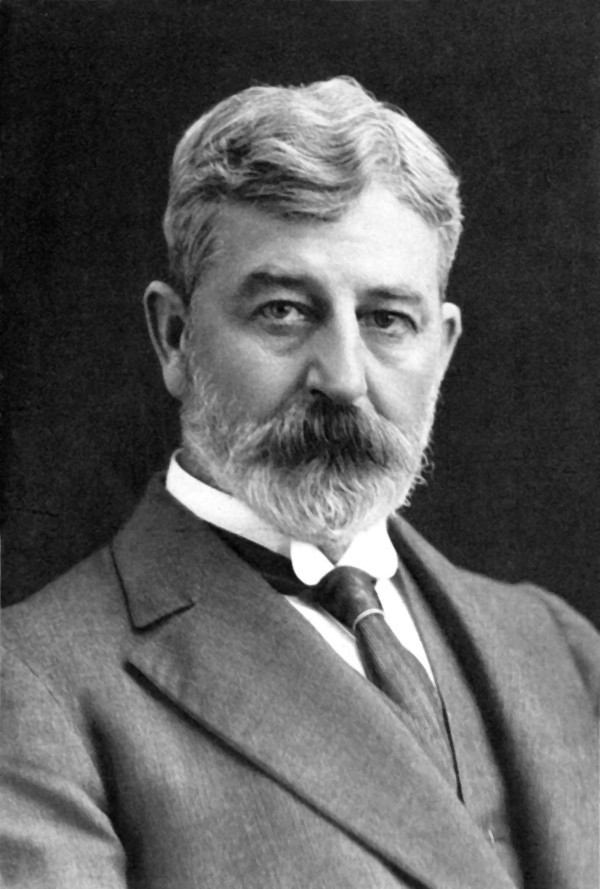
- Schreiner c. 1898

8th Prime Minister of the Cape Colony
- In office 13 October 1898 – 17 June 1900
- Monarch: Victoria
- Governor: The Viscount Milner
- Preceded by: John Gordon Sprigg
- Succeeded by: John Gordon Sprigg

Personal details
- Born: William Philip Schreiner; 30 August 1857 Wittebergen Mission Station, Cape Colony
- Died: 28 June 1919 (aged 61) Llandrindod Wells, Wales; United Kingdom
- Party: South African Party
- Spouse: Frances Hester Reitz
- Relations: Olive Schreiner (sister); Henrietta Stakesby Lewis (sister); Theophilus Lyndall Schreiner (brother); Katie Stuart (niece)
- Children: Oliver Schreiner
- Education: University of the Cape of Good Hope; University of London; Downing College, Cambridge
- Profession: Barrister, Politician

William Philip Schreiner CMG PC KC (30 August 1857 – 28 June 1919) was a South African barrister and politician who served as the eighth Prime Minister of the Cape Colony from 1898 to 1900, during the Second Boer War.

== Early life ==
Schreiner was born at Wittebergen Mission Station near Herschel, Eastern Cape. He was the tenth child of two missionaries Gottlob Schreiner and his wife, the former Rebecca Lyndall, and a younger brother of the writer Olive Schreiner. He was educated at Templeton High School, Bedford, the South African College in Cape Town, the University of the Cape of Good Hope, the University of London and Downing College, Cambridge. He took a First in the London LL.B. examination and was senior jurist in the Cambridge Law Tripos. He was admitted to the English bar in 1882, returned to Cape Town as an advocate of the Cape Supreme Court and established a thriving law practice.

== Political career ==
Schreiner became a parliamentary draughtsman in 1885, and acted as legal adviser to the Governor of Cape Colony and High Commissioner for Southern Africa in 1887. In the 1891 New Year Honours he was made a Companion of the Order of St Michael and St George (CMG). His proximity to parliamentarians gave him an entrée to political life, and in 1893 he was elected member of the Cape Parliament for Kimberley. That same year he became attorney-general in Cecil Rhodes's cabinet, which was supported by Jan Hendrik "Onze Jan" Hofmeyr and the Afrikaner Bond until the Jameson Raid, when Rhodes's imperial ambitions became clear, causing the resignation of Schreiner and the rest of the ministers in January 1896.

Schreiner was elected member for Malmesbury in 1898 and later that year became prime minister himself, heading a cabinet that included John X. Merriman and Jacobus Wilhelmus Sauer. As prime minister Schreiner favoured negotiation rather than hostilities, to the chagrin of the governor and high commissioner, Alfred Milner, who was actively fomenting war. Schreiner was forced to resign from the premiership and from Parliament in June 1900.

He failed to win a seat in 1904, but returned in 1908 as the member for Queenstown. He now adopted a liberal Bantu policy, influenced by a visit he had made in 1899 to the Transkei and the African leader John Tengo Jabavu. Schreiner advocated integration and equal rights for all "civilised" men. His dedication to this ideal was proved by his resignation from the National Convention in order to represent Dinuzulu, who was due to stand trial before a special court set up by the Government of Natal for his alleged treasonous participation in the rebellion of 1906.

Schreiner felt that the Union Government and Parliament proposed for South Africa would not uphold the liberal Bantu policy of the Cape Colony, so he went to London to oppose the passage of the South Africa Act 1909 through the British Parliament in 1909. He brought together a multiracial delegation of nine prominent Cape politicians to call for the Cape franchise which allowed all men of property to vote, irrespective of race, to be implemented in the whole of South Africa. Schreiner led the group to London, but the delegation was unsuccessful in its appeal, despite receiving considerable support from the infant Labour Party and other liberal British organisations. It was from this delegation that the South African Native National Congress was formed in 1912.

With the forming of the Union in 1910 he became one of the first senators nominated to look after black interests. Having already been made a member of the Privy Council of the United Kingdom which allowed him to be addressed as the "Right Honourable", in the 1911 New Year Honours he was granted use of "The Honourable".

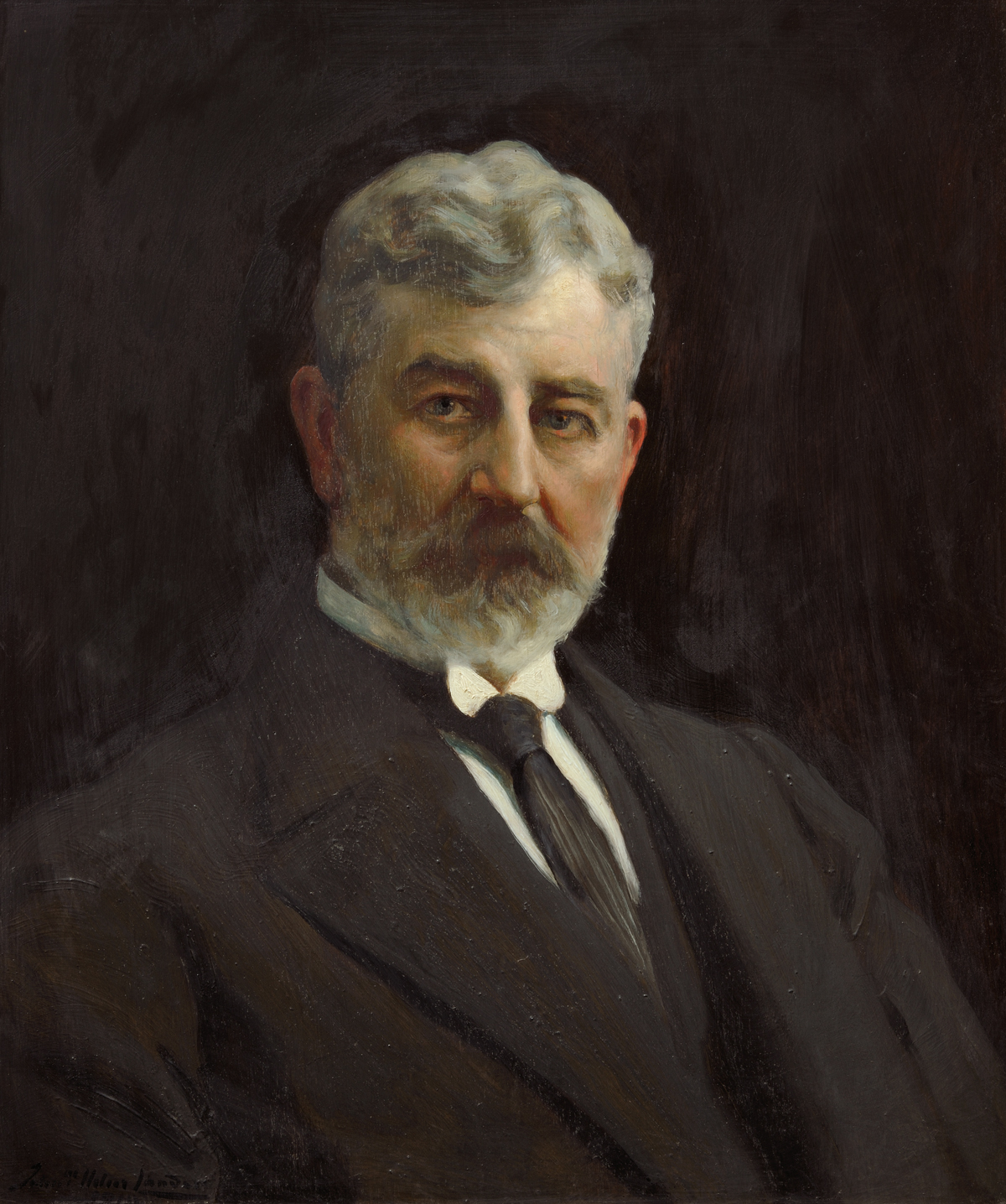
A portrait of Schreiner by John St Helier Lander, ca. 1898

== Later life ==
Schreiner was on holiday in England at the outbreak of the First World War and was asked by Gen. Botha to fill the post of High Commissioner for South Africa in London. For his work during the war as High Commissioner, King Albert I of Belgium awarded Schreiner the Grand Officer of the Order of the Crown.

He died in Llandrindod Wells, Wales, on 28 June 1919, the day the Treaty of Versailles was signed.

Schreiner was married in 1884 to Frances Hester Reitz, a sister of President F. W. Reitz. They had four children, including Oliver Schreiner, who became a judge.

== Notes ==
Political offices
Preceded by John Gordon Sprigg	Prime Minister of Cape Colony; 1898–1900	Succeeded by John Gordon Sprigg
Diplomatic posts
Preceded by Sir David Graaff	High Commissioner of South Africa to the United Kingdom; 1914–1919	Succeeded by Sir Reginald Blankenberg
