= Boerehaat =

Afrikaans word for people perceived as hating Afrikaners

Boerehaat is an Afrikaans word that means "ethnic hatred of Boers" or Afrikaners as they became known after the Second Boer War. The related term Boerehater (English: "Boer-hater" or "Boer hater") has been used to describe a person who hates, prejudices or criticises Boers or Afrikaners.

These terms were initially applied to British people perceived as prejudiced against the Boers, in the context of political conflict between the British and the Boers in southern Africa which culminated in the British defeat of the Boers in the Second Boer War. Accusations of Boerehaat have subsequently been made by numerous Afrikaner nationalists to exploit historical British prejudice against the Boers for political gain. They have applied the term Boerehater to anyone who criticised them or opposed their interests in the Cape Colony, including English-speaking white South Africans, dissident Afrikaners and black South Africans.

== Etymology and origin ==
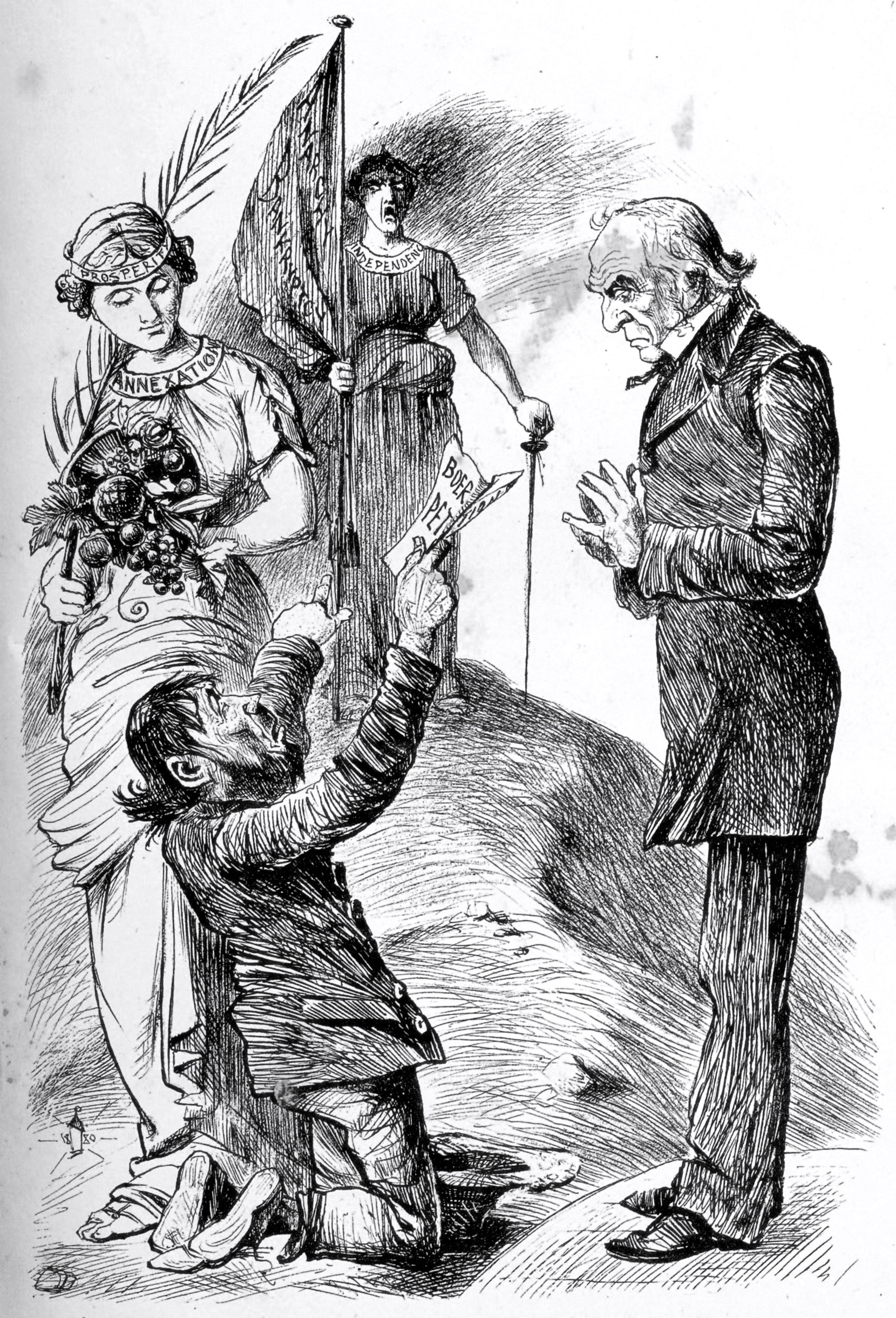
1880 political cartoon by W. H. Schröder in The Lantern depicting a Boer petitioning Britain for continued independence. The personification of annexation is associated with prosperity, independence with anarchy and bankruptcy.

Boerehaat is an Afrikaans word meaning hatred of the Boers, or Afrikaners as they became known after the Second Boer War. The related term Boerehater (English: "Boer-hater" or "Boer hater") has been used to describe a person who hates, prejudices or criticises the Boers, or Afrikaners.

Anti-Boer sentiments among the British were recorded as early as the 18th century. Boers were frequently portrayed in British literature and editorial cartoons as uncivilised and cruel, with many of these depictions being used in order to obtain the support of the British public for annexing the South African republics during the Second Boer War. The English term Boer-hater was used in a political context in the British Cape Colony as early as 1889, referring to individuals who opposed Cape Dutch interests, the use of their language in Parliament in particular.

=== Second Boer War ===
Anglo-Irish politician James Bryce, writing about the attitude of uitlanders (English-speaking immigrants) towards the Boer authorities in the independent South African Republic during the Witwatersrand Gold Rush following the discovery of gold in 1886, states: "English became the general spoken tongue not only of Johannesburg, but of the mining districts generally. Hearing nothing but English spoken, seeing nothing all round them that was not far more English than Dutch, though English with a half-colonial, half-American tinge, it was natural that the bulk of the Uitlanders should deem themselves to be in a country which had become virtually English, and should see something unreasonable or even grotesque in the control of a small body of persons whom they deemed in every way their inferiors."

Animosity between the British and the Boers intensified in the run-up to the Second Boer War fought from 1899 to 1902, and continued thereafter. One British soldier sent home a letter detailing his hatred of the Boer forces: "The Cape Dutch and Boers are a dirty treacherous lot and as soon as the Transvaal is subdued and the beggars (those that survive) trek farther out of our way the better. We do hate them down here like poison. The rascally dirty varmints, they must be exterminated; the country swarms with them and their dirty compatriots the German JewThe sight of them and their mean tricks is enough to make the mildest mannered man a demon. God pity the poor white or black under them when they have the power.

During the war, Lord Kitchener began a policy of putting all Boer civilians in the South African republics in concentration camps, with 27,000 of those interned dying primarily due to infectious diseases. This resulted in a long-lasting legacy of bitterness towards the British from Afrikaners. The British won the war, but persisting anti-British sentiments contributed to the rise of Afrikaner nationalism and the pro-Afrikaner National Party became the ruling party of South Africa from 1948 until 1994, the apartheid era.

== Apartheid era ==
The Afrikaner Nationalist is not an individualist. His whole sense of identity is bound up with conforming to his own homogeneous in-group. He tends to conform in religious worship, in unquestioning allegiance to authoritarian figures, in political ideology and in exaggerated loyalty to his in-group. Criticism of his attitudes is interpreted as an attack on the autonomy of his group (Boerehaat). He is terrified of losing his Afrikanerhood and his whiteness. Threaten these and he feels that his very self will cease to exist, and will therefore cling to them with passionate intensity.

— Anti-apartheid activist Wendy Woods, wife of Donald Woods, Daily Dispatch, 1977

During the apartheid era, the Afrikaners dominated in number of voters, politics and civil service, while English-speaking white South Africans dominated economically. The Afrikaners separated themselves from the rest of the population, both black people and English-speaking whites. In 1971 sociologist Heribert Adam writes "the historical friction between the English and Afrikaans-speaking populace is gradually being replaced by class contradictions within the two groups." Historical friction was revived and exploited by the ruling National Party for political gain however. In 1973 Edward Feit, professor of political science at the University of Michigan, writes in the American Journal of Sociology: "Recent political campaigns have shown that the old bogey of Boerehaat still has its charms for an Afrikaaner majority."

The National Party, under the leadership of B. J. Vorster, appealed to the emotions of Afrikaner voters by depicting English-speaking white citizens as being guilty of Boerehaat. The National Party and its political mouthpiece Die Burger waged a "Boerehaat campaign" during a by-election in Oudtshoorn in 1972, depicting their United Party opposition, once supported by the majority of English-speaking voters, as Boerehaters, and won. The Nationalists also used the term to censure members of the Progressive Federal Party opposition party formed in 1977. After interviewing various South Africans including government officials during the early 1980s, American historian Otto Scott writes: "This sort of xenophobic solidarity perceived the opposition as Boer haters."

White South African critics of apartheid, such as liberal politician Alex Boraine and Afrikaner anti-apartheid activist Beyers Naudé, were labelled unpatriotic Boerehaters by Nationalists and the Afrikaans press in an attempt to discredit them. White dissidents were also associated with the rooi gevaar ("communist threat"). South African poet and writer Guy Butler was called a Boerehater by Afrikaners for his promotion of English-language literature and his opposition to Afrikaner nationalism and the National Party.

English-speaking film critics were more lenient towards Afrikaans-language films lest they be accused of Boerehaat. According to The Star film critic Robert Greig, "An apology situation developed with the English-language newspapers who tended not to slam Afrikaans films because they didn't want to be accused of boerehaat (Boer-hater)." According to film critic Barry Ronge, "The cries of boerehaat come from the industry itself when they feel they are not getting 'support'."

== Post-apartheid era ==
In 1995 ANC politician Zola Skweyiya was accused of Boerehaat by Die Burger for disrespecting the Afrikaans official language in Parliament. In 1998 Jaap Marais, Afrikaner nationalist leader of the right-wing Herstigte Nasionale Party, described the post-apartheid Truth and Reconciliation Commission as an exercise in Boerehaat.

In 2011 South African politician Julius Malema was found guilty of hate speech in the High Court in Johannesburg for repeatedly singing the anti-apartheid protest song "Shoot the Boer" at political gatherings. Civil rights organisation AfriForum accused Malema of inciting violence against white South Africans, citing the ongoing spate of farm attacks (the literal meaning of Boer is "farmer"). Judge Colin Lamont ruled that Malema's singing of the song in a post-apartheid South Africa was "derogatory, dehumanising and hurtful" to the Afrikaner minority group. Lamont said "People must develop new customs and rejoice in a developing society by giving up old practices which are hurtful to members who live in that society with them."

In an incident reminiscent of the National Party's Boerehaat propaganda campaign during apartheid, ANC deputy president Cyril Ramaphosa urged disgruntled residents of the Limpopo province to vote in the 2014 general election otherwise "the Boers will come back to control us". Freedom Front Plus leader Pieter Mulder described his remarks as "primitive scare tactics" and "racist and polarising".

Sociologist Michael Neocosmos notes that critics of the ruling ANC can similarly be labelled as "standing outside the state-defined national consensus", with for example ad hominem accusations of racism and disloyalty replacing accusations of Boerehaat and communist sympathies which are hard to defend.

== See also ==
- Jingoism
- Race card
- Schwabenhass
- Weaponization of antisemitism
