= Charles Lewis (South African politician) =

South African politician (1828–1913)

Mayor of Cape Town
- In office 1876–1877
- Preceded by: P. U. Leibbrandt
- Succeeded by: Jan Christoffel Hofmeyr
- In office 1883–1884
- Preceded by: William Fleming
- Succeeded by: Philip Stigant

Personal details
- Born: 14 April 1828 Milford Haven, Pembrokeshire, Wales
- Died: 26 March 1913 (aged 84) Sea Point, Cape Town, Cape Colony
- Spouse(s): Ann Edwards, Annie Smith, Frances Foster
- Children: 14

Charles Lewis (14 April 1828 – 26 March 1913) was a South African sail maker, ship chandler, public official and twice Mayor of Cape Town.

== Biography ==
Lewis was born in Milford Haven, Wales and at the age of 15 left home to apprentice as a sailmaker. He emigrated along with his family and arrived in Cape Town in 1858. With his experience he established a successful sail-making business that operated from Bree Street in Cape Town.

Lewis had an interest in local government and in 1876 became mayor of Cape Town. He served his first term from 1876 to 1878. For several years he also represented the Namaqualand region in the old Cape Parliament. He served a second term as mayor from 1883 to 1884 and during this time was given the nickname, 'The Cleaner', for his efforts to make Cape Town cleaner.

In 1864 he founded the Alfred Rowing Club, the oldest sporting body in South Africa and still active today.

Lewis was married three times. His son, Alfred Joseph Smith Lewis, a minister by profession, was also mayor of Cape Town from 1929 to 1931.
