= Gordon Oliver (South African politician) =

Unitarian minister and former Mayor of Cape Town

Mayor of Cape Town
- In office 1989–1991
- Preceded by: Peter Muller
- Succeeded by: Frank van der Velde

Personal details
- Born: Gordon Richard Oliver; 25 May 1939 (age 87) Bloemfontein, South Africa

Gordon Richard Oliver (born 25 May 1939) is a minister emeritus of the Unitarian Church in Cape Town, a former politician and Mayor of Cape Town, South Africa.

== Biography ==
Oliver was born in Bloemfontein and raised in Gardens, Cape Town. He attended a Catholic boarding school and after school started a job as a clerk for Old Mutual in Pinelands. He had several jobs in human resources and started managing an environmental education NGO.

From a young age, he worked as a volunteer for the Progressive Party and later the Progressive Federal Party. Oliver became a part time city councillor in the Cape Town municipality during 1976 and was elected deputy mayor in 1987. At the time, the mayor and deputy mayor offices were ceremonial, with no executive powers and both offices were only for a two-year period.

Oliver became mayor on 8 September 1989. Five days after his inauguration as mayor, Oliver along with religious leaders such as Desmond Tutu, Frank Chikane, Farid Esack and Allan Boesak, led a peace march in Cape Town in defiance of the State of Emergency which banned political protests and apartheid laws which enforced racial segregation. That protest march was the first of the two major highlights of Oliver’s mayoral term. The second was welcoming Nelson Mandela to the Cape Town City Hall to address the South African nation and the world on 11 February 1990, the day of his release from prison.

After completing his two years as mayor, Oliver worked as head of Cape Town Tourism (Captour) for about eight years. He left Captour in 1998 and was offered a position to organise an international conference for the Parliament of World Religions, which took place in 1999.

When the Cape Town's Unitarian minister died in 1997, Oliver became the congregation's unofficial minister as a volunteer, and in 2000 the church hired him as minister in training. He studied in England and at the University of South Africa and was officially recognized as a minister in 2002 by the British General Assembly. He worked in the Cape Town ministry until 2008 and also obtained a master's degree in religious studies.

== Early life and education ==
Gordon Richard Oliver was born on 25 May 1939 in Bloemfontein, South Africa, and was raised in the Gardens area of Cape Town. Growing up during the early institutionalization of Apartheid, Oliver was exposed to a highly segregated society that shaped his later political and moral outlook. He attended a Catholic boarding school, where he developed an early interest in ethics, social justice, and community engagement. After completing his schooling, Oliver began working as a clerk for Old Mutual in Pinelands, gaining early experience in administrative and organizational roles. His exposure to corporate structures and social inequalities in South Africa contributed to his growing awareness of systemic injustice.

== Early political involvement ==
Oliver's political engagement began through volunteer work with the Progressive Party, one of the few legal political organizations in apartheid South Africa that opposed racial segregation policies. He later became affiliated with the Progressive Federal Party (PFP), which advocated for constitutional reform and equal rights within a parliamentary framework. During the 1970s, Oliver became increasingly active in Cape Town's civic and political landscape, eventually being elected as a part-time city councilor in 1976. His early political career was characterized by efforts to challenge discriminatory urban policies and advocate for more inclusive governance at the municipal level.

== Role in Cape Town municipal politics ==
As a city councillor, Oliver operated within a system that largely upheld apartheid structures, yet he became known for pushing the limits of what was politically permissible. His work often focused on urban policy, housing, and community relations, particularly in areas affected by forced removals and segregation laws. In 1987, he was elected deputy mayor of Cape Town, a largely ceremonial role at the time, but one that positioned him for greater influence during a critical period in South Africa's transition.

== Mayoral term and anti-apartheid actions ==
Oliver became Mayor of Cape Town on 8 September 1989, during the final years of apartheid. His tenure is notable for acts of public defiance against apartheid-era restrictions. Just days after assuming office, Oliver joined prominent religious and political leaders, including Archbishop Desmond Tutu, in leading a peace march through Cape Town. This demonstration directly challenged the State of Emergency regulations that prohibited public protest, marking a significant moment of resistance from within official political structures.

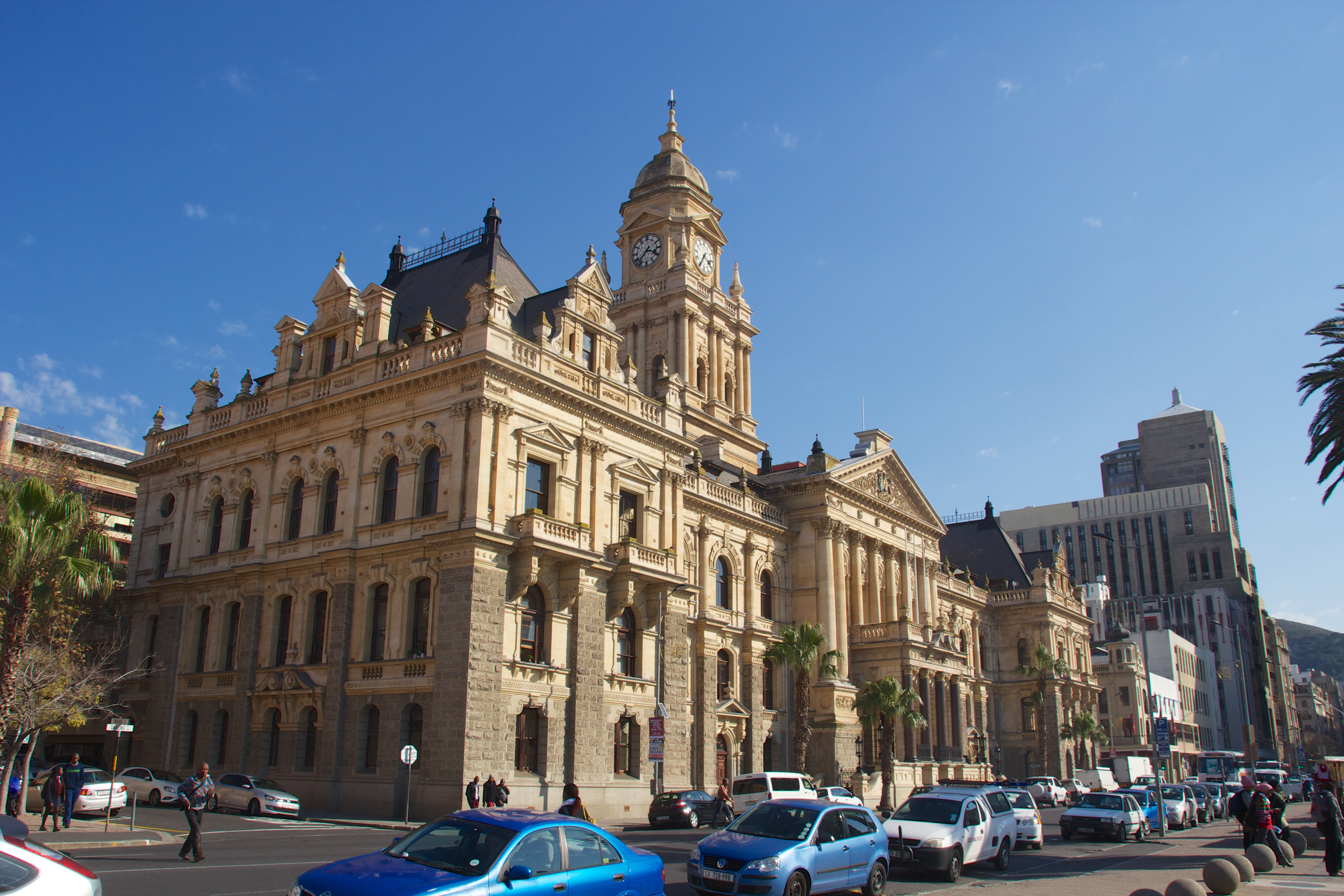
Cape Town City Hall, the site where Nelson Mandela delivered his first public address after his release in 1990

Another defining moment of Oliver's mayoralty was his role in welcoming Nelson Mandela to Cape Town City Hall on 11 February 1990, the day of Mandela's release from prison. Mandela's address from the City Hall balcony became one of the most iconic moments in South African history, symbolizing the beginning of the end of apartheid. Oliver's involvement in facilitating this event underscored his support for democratic transition and reconciliation.

== The "Open City" initiative ==
During his time in office, Oliver was associated with the "Open City" concept, which sought to challenge segregationist urban policies and promote Cape Town as an inclusive, nonracial city. While operating within the constraints of apartheid law, Oliver and like-minded officials attempted to create spaces for dialogue between municipal authorities and anti-apartheid activists. This approach reflected a broader strategy of internal resistance, where reform-minded individuals within government institutions worked to undermine apartheid from within.

== Post-mayoral career and civic engagement ==
After completing his mayoral term in 1991, Oliver continued to contribute to Cape Town's civic and economic development. He served as head of Cape Town Tourism (CapTour) for approximately eight years, where he played a role in repositioning the city as an international destination during South Africa's post-apartheid reintegration into the global economy. His work helped promote tourism as a key driver of economic growth in the region.

== Religious ministry and later life ==
In the late 1990s, Oliver transitioned into religious service following the death of a Unitarian minister in Cape Town. Initially serving as a volunteer, he later pursued formal theological training, studying in England and at the University of South Africa (UNISA). He was officially recognized as a minister by the British General Assembly of Unitarian and Free Christian Churches in 2002. Oliver served in this capacity until 2008 and also obtained a master's degree in religious studies, reflecting his continued commitment to ethical leadership and community service.

== Legacy and historical significance ==
Gordon Oliver's legacy lies in his role as a reform-oriented political figure who operated within apartheid-era institutions while actively resisting their principles. His actions as mayor, particularly his participation in protest movements and his role in Mandela's historic address, position him as an important, though often overlooked, figured in South African urban politics and transitional governance have noted the importance of such "insider reformers" in facilitating peaceful political change.
