= Philip John Stigant =

Philip Stigant

Mayor of Cape Town
- In office 1871–1872
- Preceded by: Gillis J. de Korte
- Succeeded by: Gillis J. de Korte
- In office 1874–1875
- Preceded by: Gillis J. de Korte
- Succeeded by: P.U. Leibbrandt
- In office 1884–1885
- Preceded by: Charles Lewis
- Succeeded by: Thomas Inglesby

Personal details
- Born: Philip John Stigant; 21 August 1825 Cape Town, Cape Colony
- Died: 4 October 1891 (aged 66) Sea Point, Cape Town
- Spouse: Mary Ann King

Philip John Stigant (21 August 1825 – 4 October 1891) was an influential member of the Parliament of the Cape of Good Hope and a three-time Mayor of the City of Cape Town.

== Cape Parliament ==
In his youth, Stigant served with the Cape Town Artillery, in the frontier wars. He was an undertaker by profession, and a reactionary in politics.

=== Responsible Government ===
Stigant represented Cape Town in the Cape Parliament, where he was a fierce conservative - opposing any further democratic independence from Britain. His conservative party was led by fellow MPs such as Manuel (representing the Cape Division), Barry, Clough, Fairbridge, and John X Merriman (then a conservative, but later to be a great liberal leader). This party fought against the rising "responsible government" party which advocated greater local democracy and independence from the British Colonial Office. In 1871 the "responsibles" triumphed and Stigant spend much of the rest of the decade more involved in local council elections.

=== Confederation wars ===
In the late 1870s, when Governor Bartle Frere was working to impose a system of British Confederation on southern Africa, Stigant was one of the MPs who warned Frere against forcibly disarming the Cape's Black African citizens. As a soldier, Stigant saw himself as qualified to advise on such policies. He also warned against the Confederation plan generally, stating that the Black African nations were perfectly aware that it was a plan to encircle and annex their remaining lands. He then predicted that the slow-moving imperial troop columns would perform disastrously in the rough African terrain. Altogether, in spite of being a conservative imperialist himself, he joined a large group of local leaders who implored Frere to rethink his policies.

== Mayor of Cape Town ==
Stigant went on to become Mayor of Cape Town on three separate occasions (1871–1872, 1874–1875, 1884–1885). As a Councillor, he aligned himself with the so-called "Clean Party" in local politics.

=== Clean and Dirty parties ===
The party that called itself the "Clean Party" was composed predominantly of recent immigrant English merchants and businessmen, who favoured a cleaner city with greater infrastructure to encourage investment. (With Stigant, they were led by William Fleming, W.M. Farmer, H. Bolus, J.L. Brown and A.R. McKenzie) They had the support of the Cape Times and Lantern newspapers.

They opposed the party of the ratepayers association, which they dubbed the "Dirty Party", which was composed predominantly of Malay, Coloured and Afrikaner residents and both small and large property owners. They were less afraid of the dirty streets than of being pushed out of areas of the city by the higher rates which would be needed in order to pay for the proposed new infrastructure. (They were led by Jan Christoffel Hofmeyr, M.J. Louw and Alwyn Zoutendyk)

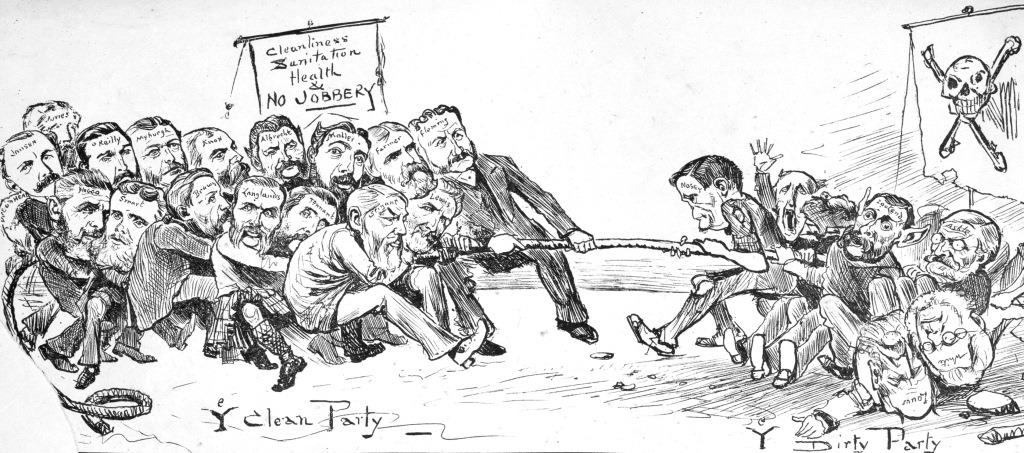
Stigant appearing in a Lantern cartoon in support of the "Clean party".

=== Specific controversies ===
In early 1879 he was involved in a legal case with the Mayor at the time (Stigant vs Hofmeyr) due to his accusation of electoral fraud against the Mayor, and his subsequent being sued for libel. (He was found guiltless of libel although the fraud accusation turned out to be baseless)

In his last term as Mayor, he was involved in a public debate with Abdol Burns, the representative of the city's Muslim Malay voters, regarding the city's smallpox control policies, which contravened Muslim practices. After attempting to persuade Burns to conform to the citywide policies, Stigant eventually relented, and was widely seen as having lost the debate.

== Family life ==
Stigant married Mary Ann King, and had one daughter, Florence (born 14 Feb 1835).
