= Tot Nut van het Algemeen =

Dutch-medium school in Cape Town from 1804 to 1870

Coordinates: 33°55′29″S 18°25′6″E

Tot Nut van het Algemeen (trans. 'For the good of all'), commonly known as Tot Nut, was a Dutch-medium school in Cape Town from 1804 to 1870.

== Description ==
The school catered for all nationalities and played an important role in educating the Dutch-speaking children of the Cape Colony. Its curriculum included modern and ancient languages, literature, mathematics drawing and vocal music. The school also maintained a preparatory section for infants. Staff were drawn from scholars, divines of different denominations and eminent professionals.

The precise location of the school has been a matter of some uncertainty. A recent study, however, has identified its original location as being in Strand Street, on the site of the present Cape Sun Hotel. In 1833 the school moved to a new building in Queen Victoria Street, a site which is today occupied by the annexe to the Cape High Court. Schröder's memento states quite categorically that it was in New Street. The school remained on this site until its closure in 1870.

== Alumni ==
- Jan Hendrik Hofmeyr (Onze Jan) (1845–1909), South African politician.
- Sir John Gilbert Kotzé (1849–1940), Chief Justice of the Transvaal High Court 1881–1898, Attorney-General of Southern Rhodesia in 1900, appointed judge of the Supreme Court of the Cape 1913, becoming Judge-President in 1920. Judge of Appeal from 1922, retiring in 1927.
- William Howard Schröder (1851–1892), cartoonist, caricaturist and publisher of the humorous weekly, 'The Knobkerrie'
- Jeremias Ziervogel (1802–1883), founding member of the Cape Parliament.
- Jan Christoffel Hofmeyr (1829–1898), notary, financier and Mayor of Cape Town.

== Bibliography ==
- Case Study of the 'Tot Nut van het Algemeen' School - Sigi Howes, University of Stellenbosch
