= Cape Town peace march =

Anti-apartheid demonstration in Cape Town in 1989

On 13 September 1989, 30 000 Capetonians from a diverse cross-section of the city marched in support of peace and the end of apartheid. The event, led by Mayor Gordon Oliver, Archbishop Tutu, Rev Frank Chikane, Moulana Farid Esack, Allan Boesak, and other religious leaders, was held in defiance of the State of Emergency. The march resulted in concessions from the apartheid cabinet headed by FW de Klerk, following years of violent clashes between anti-apartheid protestors and the police, and was the first such event to include elected world government functionaries. It was considered the "last illegal march" at the time, and went ahead without a major confrontation. The size of the protest, despite the open defiance, and the restrained response from the police signalled the beginning of the transition to democracy.

== Build-up ==
An anti-apartheid Defiance Campaign had been announced in the run-up to the whites-only general election. With many political organisations banned and leaders in prison or detained without trial, the campaign was led by a broad cross-section of leaders, including religious leaders, community leaders and trade union activists, sometimes operating under the banner of the Mass Democratic Movement. Previous protests were met with force by the police. A protest in the centre of Cape Town 10 days earlier was dispersed by a water cannon dispensing purple dye, prompting the slogan the purple shall govern.

More than 20 people were killed in the vicinity of Cape Town on the election day of 6 September 1989, and at a memorial service for these deaths, Tutu called for a wider protest march to take place the following week. The march gathered wide support, including from groups not usually active in protest marches, including businesses and white opposition parties.

== State response ==
Earlier in 1989, the State President P.W. Botha had been replaced by F.W. de Klerk as head of the ruling National Party. De Klerk led his party to victory in the whites-only election on 6 September and was due to be inaugurated as State President a week after the march.

The march polarised support within the government. The security establishment opposed it, but De Klerk decided that the march would not be broken up by force to prevent a violent confrontation and the associated negative publicity. Fearing a "Velvet Revolution" of the kind which was occurring in Eastern Europe, De Klerk capitulated to demands from the anti-apartheid movement. This signalled a significant change from the Botha era and lead to concessions that ushered in the transition to democracy.

== The march ==
The march began near Cape Town's St. George's Cathedral and proceeded down Adderley Street, ending at the Grand Parade. The crowd was led by the city's mayor and a group of religious leaders and marshalls from the United Democratic Front. Unlike previous protests, the police were not present to confront the marchers, and the march went peacefully. Outside the Cape Town City Hall, Tutu gave a speech referring to South Africa as a rainbow country.

== Aftermath ==
The success of the march and the fact that the police refused to enforce the ban against such gatherings under the then State of Emergency led to further marches in many parts of the country, often instigated by religious leaders. Liberal commentator Allister Sparks regards the march as the beginning of the normalisation of South African politics and September 1989 as the culmination of De Klerk's conversion to negotiations.

A few months later, South Africa entered a new political era when De Klerk unbanned the African National Congress and other anti-apartheid organisations and freed Nelson Mandela and other political prisoners. Formal negotiations to end apartheid began soon afterwards.
