= Leeuwenhof =

Official residence of the Premier of the Western Cape in South Africa

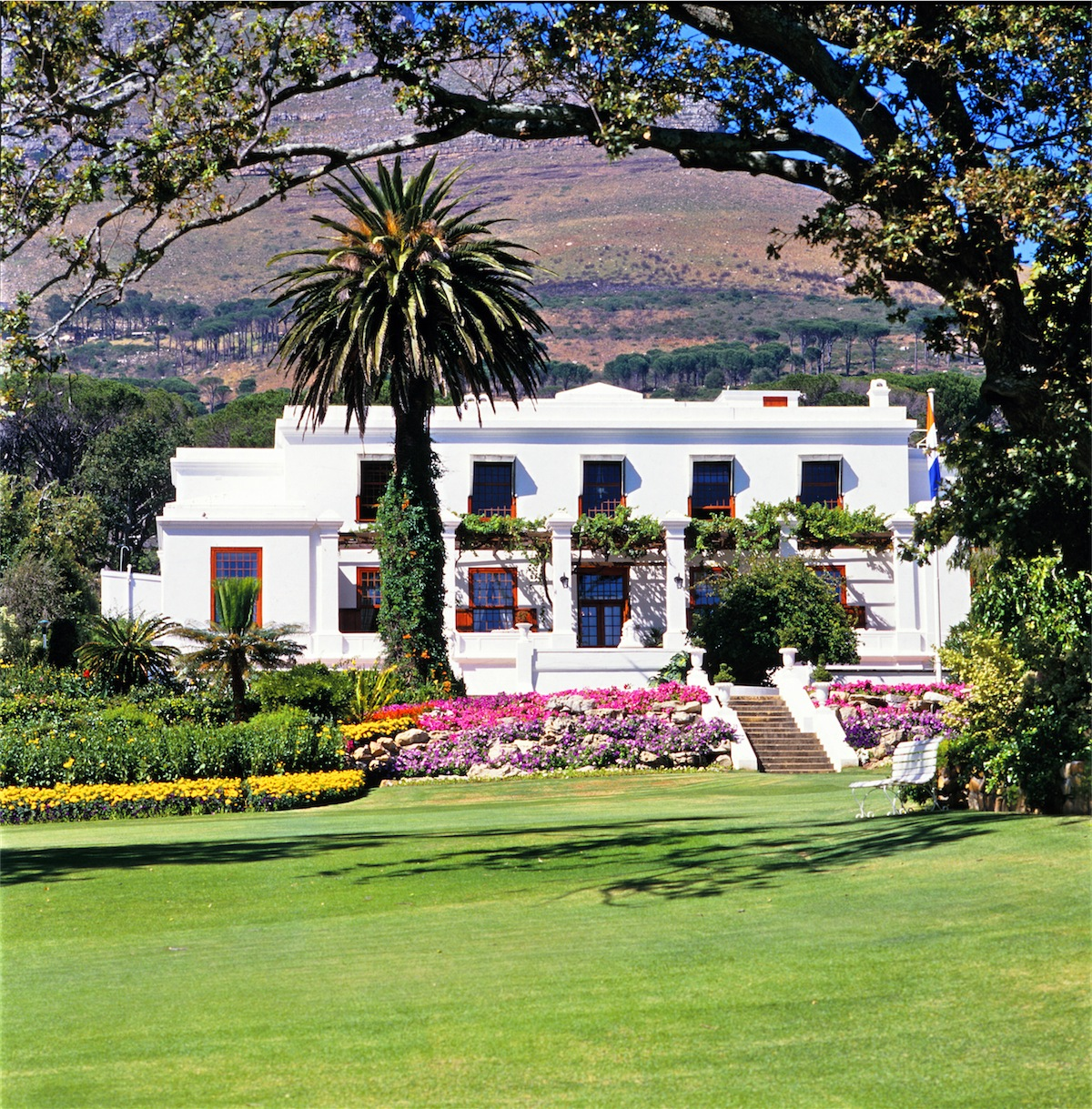
- Leeuwenhof in 1988.
- Interactive map of Leeuwenhof
- Location: Gardens, Cape Town
- Coordinates: 33.938°S 18.406°E

Leeuwenhof is an estate in the Gardens area of Cape Town, South Africa. It is the official residence of the Premier of the Western Cape. Leeuwenhof was originally a farmhouse dating to the time of the Dutch East India Company's rule of Cape Town. It includes a Slave Quarters which has been renovated and used to house an exhibition about slavery in Cape Town. It was declared a national heritage site on 15 December 1966.

== History ==
When the mansion was built and who built it is not precisely known, but it was owned by 15 proprietors, all prosperous, before it was purchased by the provincial government.

On 22 October 1693, Governor Simon van der Stel granted the 12 ha near Table Mountain as a homestead to the businessman Guillaume Heems. After just 2.5 years, the farm was sold to the Company's Garden botanist, surveyor, and gardener Henrik Bernard Oldenland. Upon his death, his widow sold it to the Fiscal Joan Blesius, who probably built the first house on the farm. In 1764, Johan Bräsler, originally from Copenhagen, purchased the farm. He built the current mansion from 1764 to 1788, planting native trees and growing fruits and vegetables there. Capt. Johannes Zorn owned it from 1799 to 1836. He expanded the farm by annexing adjacent land until it reached 79 ha, becoming a successful farmer who owned dozens of slaves and planted large vineyards. In 1809, Zorn was appointed magistrate.

From 1841 to 1847, Sir Christoffel Brand, the first Speaker of the Parliament of the Cape of Good Hope and father of President of the Orange Free State Johannes Brand, owned Leeuwenhof. Next, from 1847 to 1881, Petrus Johannes Kotzé owned the estate. He was twice Mayor of Cape Town and a member of the Cape Parliament himself in 1859. His son John Gilbert Kotzé, later Chief Justice of the South African Republic and Appeals Court Justice of the Union of South Africa, was born here. In the time of the Kotzés, the farm was already being encroached on by urban sprawl. The fountain there was expropriated by the City of Cape Town to supply water. In 1881, the millionaires Sammy Marks and Isaac Lewis purchased the estate. Shortly afterwards, Lewis (a mining magnate) became the sole owner of the property, now down to 2 ha around the mansion, and proceeded to refurbish and renovate the house with antique furniture.

On 21 December 1936, the Cape Province Administration (Afrikaans: Kaapse Provinsiale Administrasie (KPA) purchased the house as the official residence of the Administrator of Cape Province. The KPA repurchased the adjoining land from the historic estate.

== See also ==
- List of Castles and Fortifications in South Africa

== Bibliography ==
- (af) Botha, Amanda. Die geskiedenis van Leeuwenhof. Lantern, December 1969, jaargang 19
- (af) Oberholster, J.J. Die historiese monumente van Suid-Afrika. Cape Town: Kultuurstigting Rembrandt van Rijn vir Die Raad vir Nasionale Gedenkwaardighede, 1972. ISBN 0-620-00191-7
- (af) Standard Encyclopaedia of Southern Africa, vol. 6. Cape Town: Nasou, 1972. ISBN 0-625-00322-5
