= Herzliya (disambiguation) =

Herzliya is a city on the central coast of Israel.

Herzliya, Herzlia or Herzliah (Hebrew: הֶרְצְלִיָּה) may also refer to:

- Herzliah High School, a high school in Montreal, Canada
- Herzliya Hebrew High School, a high school in Tel Aviv, Israel
- United Herzlia Schools, Jewish day-school in Cape Town, South Africa
