= Thomas Inglesby =

Mayor of Cape Town
- In office 1885–1886
- Preceded by: Philip Stigant
- Succeeded by: John Woodhead

Personal details
- Born: Thomas James Campbell Inglesby; 19 September 1832 Cape Town, Cape Colony
- Died: 18 July 1889 (aged 56) Cape Town, Cape Colony
- Spouse: Mary Ann Bell

Thomas James Campbell Inglesby (19 September 1832 – 18 July 1889) was a Cape Colony building contractor, public official and Mayor of Cape Town.

== Biography ==
Inglesby was the son of Jane Wilson and Thomas Inglesby, who was a master craftsman at the castle in Cape Town. After Inglesby sr. retired from his service at the castle, he started as a builder, and Inglesby probably did his apprenticeship with his father, after which he started his own business in his house in Sir Lowry Street, Cape Town. He soon became one of the leading builders in the Cape.

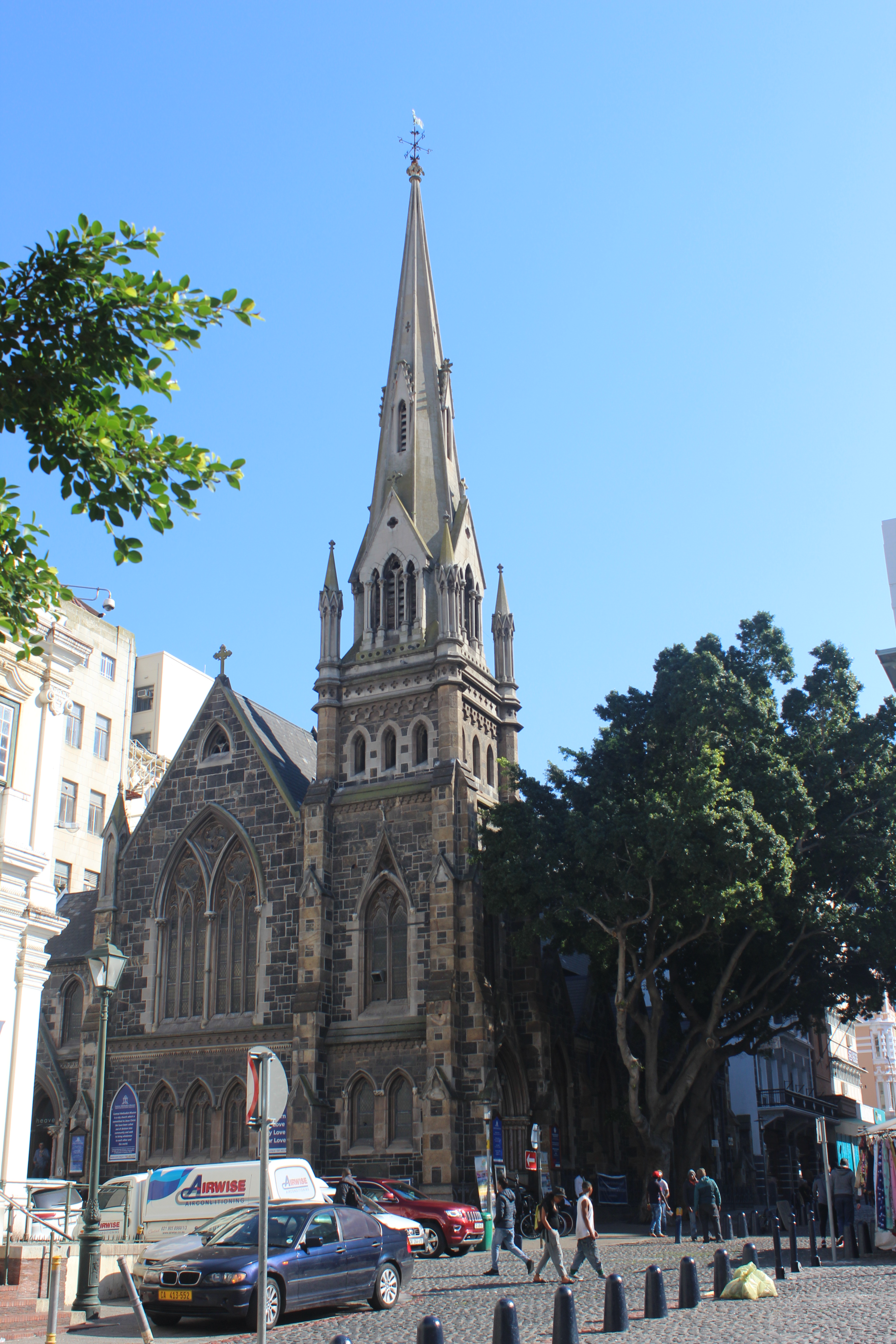
Methodist Metropolitan church, Cape Town

Inglesby regularly collaborated with the architect Charles Freeman and together they were responsible for the construction of the Standard Bank building on Adderley Street, Cape Town, the Queen's Hotel in Sea Point and the Methodist Metropolitan church, located next to Greenmarket Square in Cape Town. His work also included the General Estate and Orphan Chamber Building, the Stuttafords Building on Adderley Street and he was often employed on building work at the St George's Cathedral.

Inglesby was an active member of the Prince Alfred's Own Cape Town Volunteer Artillery and the Commanding Officer from 1875 to 1877. With the rank of captain, he took part in the Tambookie Campaign in Tembuland during 1879 and 1880, after which he was promoted to major.

His son, Lieutenant-Colonel Thomas John James Inglesby, was also the commanding officer of the Cape Artillery during the Anglo-Boer war of 1899-1902. The regiment was known as Prince Alfred’s Own Cape Artillery from 1896 to 1903.

In his public life, Inglesby was a city councilor in Cape Town for several years and served as mayor of Cape Town during 1885–1886. In addition, he served on the Divisional Board and the Licensing Board.
