= Wynberg Boys' High School =

Boys' school in Cape Town

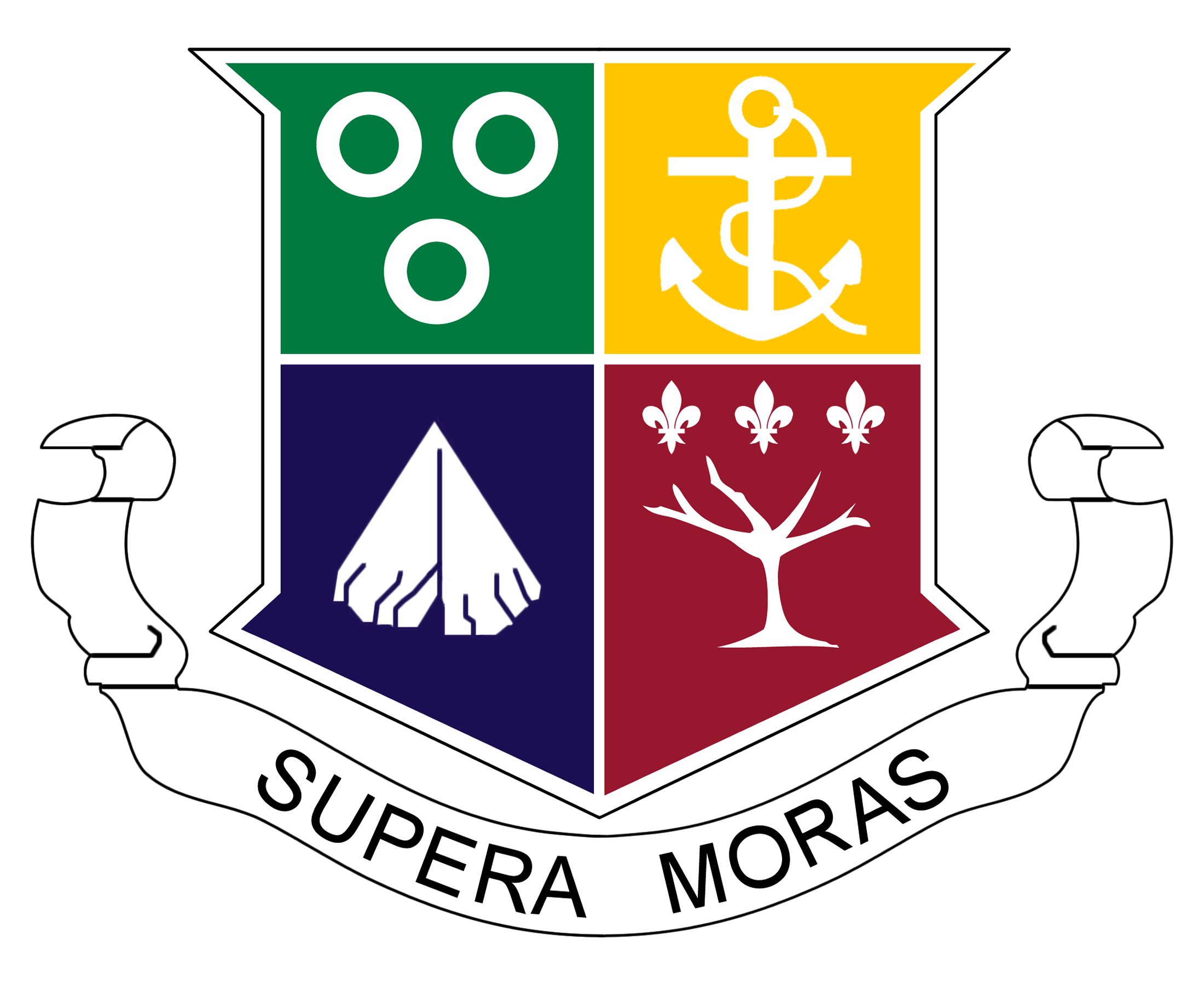
- Wynberg Boys' High school school crest

Location
- Lovers Walk, Wynberg; Cape Town, Western Cape; South Africa; 33°59′47″S 18°27′32″E

Information
- Type: All-boys public school
- Motto: Supera Moras (Overcoming Difficulties)
- Established: 1841; 185 years ago
- Founder: John McNaughton
- Sister school: Wynberg Girls' High School
- School number: +27 (021) 797 4247
- Headmaster: Deon Scheepers
- Grades: 8–12
- Gender: Male
- Age: 14 to 18
- Enrollment: 1000 boys
- Language: English
- Schedule: 08:00 - 15:00
- Campus: Urban Campus
- Campus type: Suburban
- Houses: Glebe; Hawthornden; Littlewood; McNaughton; Oude Wijnberg; Silverhurst; Sunninghill; Trovato; Tennant; Garrison
- Colours: Navy; White
- Rivals: Bishops Diocesan College; Paarl Boys' High School; Paul Roos Gymnasium; Rondebosch Boys High School; South African College Schools
- Accreditation: Western Cape Education Department
- Publication: The Wynbergian
- Alumni: Old Wynbergians
- Website: www.wbhs.org.za

Wynberg Boys' High School is a public English medium boys high school situated in the suburb of Wynberg of Cape Town in the Western Cape province of South Africa. Founded in 1841, it is one of the best academic schools in Cape Town, it is believed by scholars and old boys to be the second-oldest school in South Africa, however, there are several schools that were established at earlier dates as far back as 1738.

== History ==
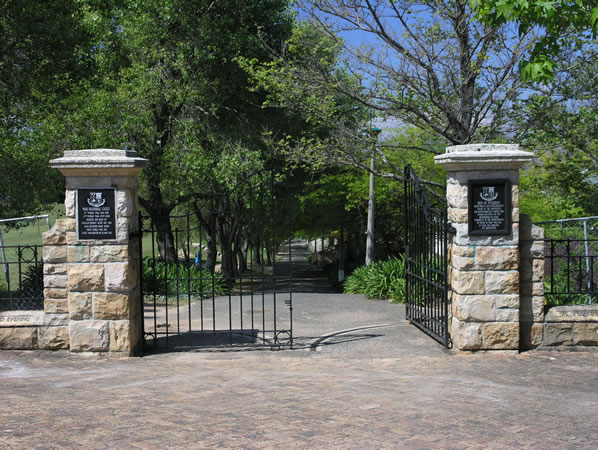
Memorial Gates

In 1841, John McNaughton re-opened the doors of his school, the "Established School at Wynberg", in Glebe Cottage with 16 pupils enrolled. McNaughton's school shared the cottage with the Lady D'Urban School of Industry for young ladies.

Initially a co-educational school, it limited enrollment to boys in 1853. The senior and junior schools operated as one school until 1943 when they separated.

In 1845, the school moved to Bryndewyn Cottage. In 1863, the Government relegated the school to the status of "second class elementary school" and instructed the headmaster, Mr. MacNaughton to close on 27 February. Permission was granted to change Wynberg Boys to a private school on 2 March.

A building was purchased from the Higgs estate in 1876, and in 1891, Sir Herbert Baker designed new buildings that opened in 1892. In 1980, the school moved to its current site on the Hawthornden Estate in Wynberg.

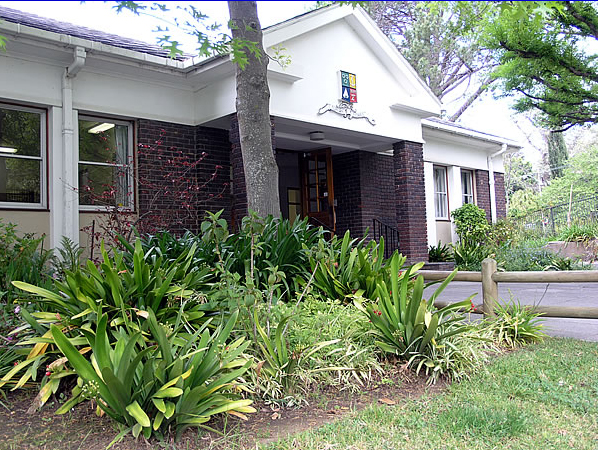
Main Entrance

The school has two museums. Two books have been written on Wynberg: The History of a School (1961) by English teacher Doug Thompson, and A School Reflects (1991) by Old Boy Roger Goodwin.

The school's motto, Supera Moras, can be translated from Latin as Overcome Difficulties.

There is an unofficial motto that is used frequently for marketing, "Brothers in an endless chain"

== Sporting activities ==
Wynberg Boys' High School has a competitive sporting tradition. Students take part in sporting competitions, with schools from Western Cape and sometimes from other parts of South Africa, as well as occasional competitions with visiting international teams. Rivals include Rondebosch Boys' High School, Diocesan College, and Paul Roos Gymnasium as well as South African College Schools.

The school offers sporting facilities such as an astro turf area, a swimming pool, tennis and squash courts, four rugby fields, and the WBHS cricket field, which was renamed in 2010 as "The Jacques Kallis Oval" in honour of the World cricketer of the year and former Wynberg Boy.

== Culture ==
The WBHS music department boasts a large collection of bands that play a range of music from jazz to classical. Choir and band members are offered professional training. WBHS has three fundamental school bands: the Concert Band, the Steel Band and the Jazz Band, however also has smaller ensembles for guitarists and string players. With a nod to the Scottish history of the school, Wynberg is one of only a handful of schools in the country that has a bagpipe band. The Wynberg Boys' and Girls' High bands come together every year to form the Combined Band, playing at many inter-school events.

Every year Wynberg Boys' High School holds a memorial day celebrating the school's founding. The school pays tribute to Wynberg Old Boys who died fighting in World War I, World War II and the South African Border War. In World War I, 42 Wynberg Old Boys were killed.

== Notable alumni ==
=== Sport ===
==== Rugby ====
- Toskie Smith, Springbok forward (1891–96)
- Doug Hopwood
- Dave Stewart
- Lionel Wilson, Springbok fullback (1960–65)
- Rob Louw, Springbok flank (1980–84)
- Franklin Bertolini, Namibian prop (2014)
- Sikhumbuzo Notshe, Springbok flank (2018)
- Gary Gold, Former Springbok, Western Province rugby coach, Current head coach at Worcester Warriors.
- Zach Porthen (2022), South African rugby player

==== Cricket ====
- Jacques Kallis, South African cricketer
- Allan Lamb, English cricketer
- Garth Le Roux, South African cricketer
- Charl Willoughby, South African cricketer
- Shadley van Schalkwyk, Chevrolet Knights cricketer
- Dominic Telo, Cape Cobras and Derbyshire cricketer
- Richard Levi, Cape Cobras cricketer and South African cricketer
- Kyle Verreynne, Western Province cricket team and South African cricketer
- David Bedingham, Western Province cricket team and South African cricketer
- Fritz Bing, Western Province cricketer and administrator

==== Hockey ====
- Wayne Denne, South African Hockey Team
- Rhett Halkett, South Africa Hockey Captain 2013
- Lloyd Norris-Jones, South African Hockey Team
- Ian Haley, South African Hockey Team

=== Politicians ===
- Hendrik Verwoerd (1901-1966), Former Prime Minister of South Africa.
- Andrew Feinstein (1964), South African politician (ANC), British politician (Labour, Independent), & activist.
- Grant Haskin (1968), South African politician (ACDP) & city councilor.
- Richard Friedlander (1923-2007), former mayor of Cape Town.

=== Other ===
- Vic Clapham (1886-1962), founder of the Comrades Marathon.
- Charles Warburton Meredith (1896-1977), Air Vice-Marshal of Rhodesia.
- Izak David du Plessis (1900-1981), author.
- Michael Gelfand (1912 -1985), distinguished Professor of tropical medicine.
- Douglas Scott, High Court Judge.
