= The Observer (Cape newspaper) =

The Observer of South African Affairs was a Port Elizabeth based newspaper of the Cape Colony, that was published from 6 July 1876. In the 1880s it underwent a series of name changes, to the Port Elizabeth Spectator (May 1886 - September 1888), and the Spectator and Evening Mail (September 1888 - January 1890).

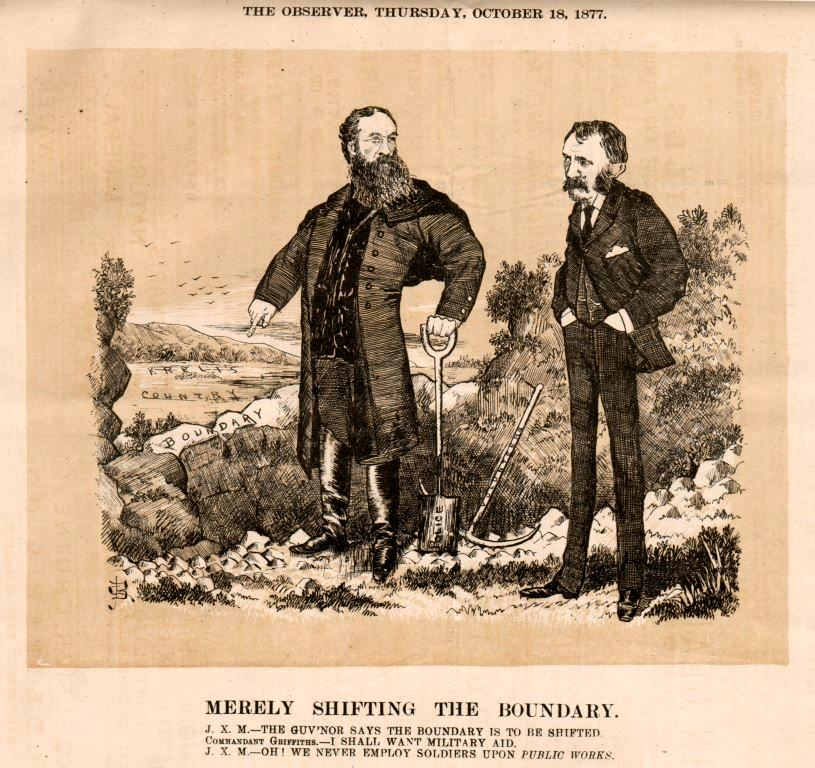
Observer cartoon attacking the Cape Town government (represented by John X. Merriman) for its reluctance to embark on imperial expansion. 1877.

It took an extreme pro-imperialist "jingoist" stance and strongly opposed the "Cape Liberal Tradition" that was centred on Cape Town and dominated Cape politics at the time. The Observer, together with the Grahamstown Journal of Robert Godlonton, championed the reactionary 1820 Settler lobby in pushing for expansionist policies against the neighbouring Xhosa people. It called for restrictions on the multi-racial Cape Qualified Franchise and for the establishment of an independent "Eastern Cape Colony" separate from the Cape Colony.

The Observer ran a series of satirical cartoons, starting with its first edition on 6 July 1876. After the 27 June 1878 edition, the resident cartoonist, Charles J Barber, moved to the rival Port Elizabeth publication, The Cape Hornet and was replaced by William Howard Schröder who had just moved from the Lantern newspaper of Cape Town. The cartoons attacked both the neighbouring Xhosa people, and the liberal Cape government which was restricting the settlers' expansion into Xhosa land.
