= Bantom =

Bantom is a surname. Notable people with the surname include:

- Mike Bantom (born 1951), American basketball player
- William Bantom (born 1946), South African politician
