= John Gilbert Kotzé =

The Honourable Sir John Gilbert Kotzé KC
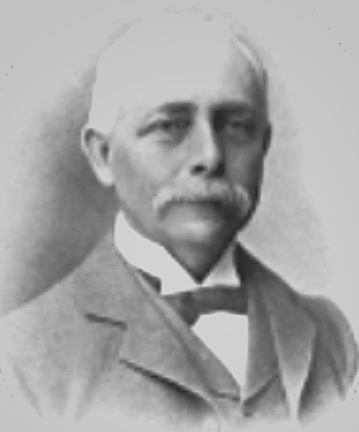

Judge of the Appellate Division of South Africa
- In office 1923–1927

Judge President of the Cape Provincial Division
- In office 1920–1922
- Preceded by: Sir Henry Juta
- Succeeded by: Sir Malcolm Searle

Judge of the Cape Provincial Division of the Supreme Court
- In office 1913–1920

Judge President of the Supreme Court of the Eastern Districts
- In office 1904–1912

Judge of the Supreme Court of the Eastern Districts
- In office 1903–1904

Attorney General of Southern Rhodesia
- In office 9 August 1900 – 7 April 1903
- Preceded by: Sir Thomas Scanlen (Legal Adviser)
- Succeeded by: Clarkson Henry Tredgold

Chief Justice of Transvaal
- In office 1881–1898
- Preceded by: New position
- Succeeded by: Reinhold Gregorowsky

Judge of the High Court of the Transvaal
- In office 1877–1881

Personal details
- Born: Johannes Gysbertus Blanckenberg Kotzé; 5 November 1849 Cape Town, Cape Colony
- Died: 1 April 1940 (aged 90) Oranjezicht, Cape Town, Union of South Africa
- Relations: Petrus Kotzé (father)

Sir John Gilbert Kotzé KC (5 November 1849 – 1 April 1940) was a South African jurist.

== Early life ==
Kotzé was born in Cape Town and was given the Christian names of Johannes Gysbert Blanckenberg, but he used the anglicized form, John Gilbert. He was educated at Tot Nut van het Algemeen and the South African College in Cape Town. His father was Petrus Johannes Kotzé, who owned the Leeuwenhof estate at the foot of Table Mountain and represented Cape Town in two Parliaments, as a member of the House of Assembly, and was twice Mayor of Cape Town. His brother, Rev J.J. Kotzé (older by 17 years), studied for the Church. It was recorded he was a distinguished student at Utrecht, where he graduated summa cum laude and shared the distinction of being the best classical scholar at the university. The earlier written records of the Kotzé family in Germany date back as far as the year 1234 and indicate the family is of noble descent. The spelling of the family name (in Africa) changes from Kotzee as reflected last in 1912 (in the document Master of the Supreme Court re: Johannes Albertus Kotzee) to finally Kotzé in 1916 (in the hand of Salmon Jacobus Petrus Kotzé).

Kotzé undertook further legal training in Britain as a student at the Inner Temple in London, where he met his wife Mary Aurelia Bell. Kotzé became a barrister of the Inner Temple and practised in Cape Town and Grahamstown from 1874 to 76.

== Judicial career ==
Kotzé was appointed judge of the High Court of the Transvaal in 1877, becoming Chief Justice in 1881. He, together with the rest of the High Court, was unceremoniously dismissed by Paul Kruger following a dispute over the Testing Rights issue. Kotze had stood in 1893 as a rival to Kruger in the presidential elections and was seen by Kruger as his long term political rival. Kruger, on this particular occasion, was enraged at the judgement of the High Court in the case of Brown v. Leyds and he dismissed Chief Justice Kotzé in 1898 as President Kruger held his own opinion on the case outcome. The circumstances surrounding this judgement are worth exploring as they are illustrative of the Legal and general state of public administration in the Transvaal at the time during the British Rule and the Volksraad's Constitution, a "document born of political compromise between warring factions rather than any kind of coherent legal document". The Constitution was seen as "so vague and obscure in so many areas that it had never been treated with the seriousness and respect which such a document usually merits.

Kruger's action was widely seen as unwarranted interference with the independence of the judiciary." The Second Boer War soon followed in 1899, with every Boer town in the hands of the British, "President Kruger fled/went in exile in the Netherlands". Over 26,000 women and children were to perish in the War's concentration camps.

In 1898 Kotzé resumed legal practice in Pretoria. He was appointed Attorney-General of Southern Rhodesia in 1900, and took silk as King's Counsel in April 1902. He was appointed judge of the Eastern Districts Court of the Cape Colony in 1903, he became Judge-President of that division in 1904. He was then appointed judge of the Supreme Court of the Cape Provincial Division in 1913, becoming Judge-President in 1920. When Justice Christian Maasdorp retired in 1922, Kotzé became Judge of Appeal, starting in 1922 until his retirement in 1927.

The five judges of the South African Appellate Division in 1923 (from left): Kotzé, Sir William Henry Solomon, Sir James Rose Innes (then Chief Justice), Jacob de Villiers and Sir John Wessels.

To conclude some historic career highlights, it is noted in a nutshell by the Supreme Court of Appeal Homepage that:

"the judicial career of Sir John Gilbert Kotzé (1849–1940) spanned 50 years from his appointment in 1877, when he was a mere 27 years old, until his retirement in 1927. As chief justice of the Transvaal Republic he was dismissed by President Kruger when he held that the courts had the right to test against the Constitution, and declare invalid, resolutions and acts passed by the legislature."

To date, Books of "Latin and High Dutch of the Roman-Dutch old authorities is occasionally still used, as at times it is necessary for a modern judge to delve into these old authorities to search for the origin and scope of an otherwise obscure legal rule or doctrine."

== Honours and awards ==
Kotzé was knighted in February 1917.

Judge Kotzé's personal book collection of over 1500 books, is still to date referred to and used by the Supreme Court of Appeal Judges. It is said of Kotzé:

"A noted scholar, a man of immense learning and a collector of books, his collection of 1556 titles, bought by the government in 1927 for £800, formed the nucleus of the then fledgling library of the Appellate Division, and is still retained as a separate collection."

A bust of Kotzé, by E Grace Wheatley, is located with the collection.
