= Toski Smith =

South African rugby union player (1871–1917)

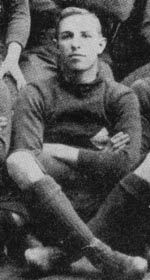
- Born: Christie William Smith; 9 April 1871 Cape Town, Cape Colony
- Died: 28 February 1934 (aged 62)
- School: Wynberg Boy's High School

Rugby union career
- Position: Forward
Provincial / State sides
| Years | Team | Apps | (Points) |
| | Griquas | 0 | (0) |
International career
| Years | Team | Apps | (Points) |
| 1891 - 1896 | South Africa | 3 | (0) |
- Correct as of 25 October 2018

Toski Smith (9 April 1871 – 28 February 1934) was a Cape Colony international rugby union player who played as a forward. He made 3 appearances for South Africa against the British Lions in 1891 and 1896.
