= Lionel Wilson (rugby union) =

South African rugby union player

- Born: Lionel Geoffrey Wilson; 25 May 1933 Cape Town, Union of South Africa
- Died: 17 September 2017 (aged 84) Napier, New Zealand
- School: Wynberg Boys' High School

Rugby union career
- Position: Full back
Provincial / State sides
Years	Team	Apps	(Points)
1955–66	Western Province		
International career
Years	Team	Apps	(Points)
1960–65	South Africa	27	(6)

Lionel Geoffrey Wilson (25 May 1933 – 17 September 2017) was a South African rugby union player who played 27 tests for the Springboks. He made his debut against the All Blacks on 13 August 1960 in the Union of South Africa. The match ended in a draw 11-11. He played in 60 games for Western Province.

Wilson was born to Billy and Doris Wilson in Cape Town, he was their second child. He grew up in Plumstead and Wynberg and attended Wynberg Boys' High School. He was married to Pam Walker. He emigrated to New Zealand in 1976, he returned to South Africa before moving back again to New Zealand.

He died on 17 September 2017 at his home in Napier, New Zealand.
