= The Cape Hornet =

Former South African newspaper

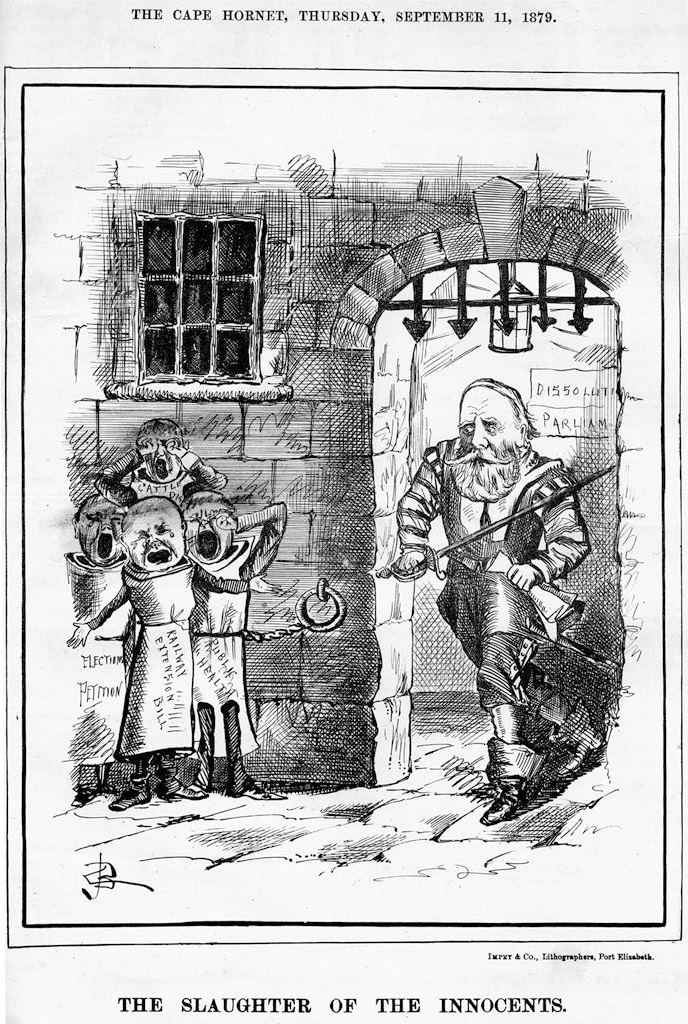
Cape Hornet cartoon on Prime Minister Gordon Sprigg's cutting of health and infrastructure projects to pay for the ongoing Confederation wars.

The Cape Hornet was a newspaper that operated from Port Elizabeth in the Cape Colony in 1879.

The Cape Hornet ran only from 5 June until 29 November 1879, just under 6 months in total. It was edited by William T. Eady and illustrated by the cartoonist Charles Barber, who had previously worked for the other major Port Elizabeth publication at the time, the Observer. The illustrations covered public events and political satire. The Hornet was a prominent supporter of the attempt by Carnarvon to enforce a British confederation on southern Africa.
