= Louis Kreiner =

South African politician and former mayor of Cape Town

Mayor of Cape Town
- In office 1979–1981
- Preceded by: Edward Mauerberge
- Succeeded by: M.J. van Zyl

Personal details
- Born: 23 October 1928 Grabouw, Cape Province, South Africa
- Died: 24 May 1994 (aged 65)
- Spouse(s): Ethel Sachar; Patricia Sulcas Kreiner
- Children: 2
- Occupation: Politician

Louis Kreiner (23 October 1928 – 24 May 1994) was a South African politician and Mayor of Cape Town from 1979 to 1981. His brother, Sol Kreiner subsequently held the position between 1983 and 1985. His wife, Patricia Sulcas Kreiner was also mayor of the city from 1993 to 1995.

== Early life ==
He was born and raised Grabouw in the Cape Province to a Jewish family. His late grandfather, Eliezer had been a rabbi in Poland. His father Chaim was deeply involved in the local Jewish community in Grabouw and held Shabbat services at the family home for the seven other Jewish families living in the town. As a boarder, he attended Herzlia, a Jewish school in Cape Town.

== Career ==
Kreiner was involved in efforts to increase tourism to Cape Town. He visited Taiwan, where he marketed Cape Town as a tourist destination.

For Jerusalem Day in 1980, Kreiner attended celebrations at the Baxter Theatre, where he had a telephone hookup with Jerusalem mayor, Teddy Kollek.
