= Frederick Smith (South African politician) =

South African politician and businessman

Sir Frederick William Smith (1861 - 1926) was a South African businessman and legislator. He held the post of Mayor of Cape Town from 1908 to 1912.

== Life ==
After holding the post of Mayor of Cape Town from 1908 to 1912, he remained on the council as Deputy Mayor the following year. He was a vice president of the South African Society of Artists which was founded in 1902. He was also an early member of the Cape Town Photographic Society. Smith welcomed Robert Baden-Powell to Cape Town in 1912.
