= Selwyn Selikowitz =

South African judge

The Honourable Selwyn Selikowitz SC

Judge of the Western Cape Division of the High Court
- In office 1987–2007

Personal details
- Born: 11 April 1942 (age 84) Cape Town, South Africa
- Education: University of Cape Town
- Profession: Advocate

Selwyn Selikowitz (born 11 April 1942) is a former Cape High Court Judge from South Africa. He is married to Wendy Schwartz with whom he has three children (two of whom are lawyers). He is currently a lecturer at the University of New South Wales in Sydney, Australia.

== Early life and education ==
Selikowitz was born on 11 April 1942 in Cape Town, South Africa. He attended the Herzlia primary and high schools, graduating from high school in 1959. He then graduated from a Bachelor of Arts in 1963 and received his LLB (with Honours) in 1965. Selikowitz was admitted as an advocate in 1966 and took silk in 1983.

== Legal Profession ==
Selikowitz became a member of the Cape Bar in 1966. He was appointed to the Cape Bench in 1987. He also served on the Bar Council from 1974 to 1987.

== Controversies ==
Former President of South Africa, Apartheid strongman P. W. Botha, won his appeal against a conviction of contempt handed down for his refusal to testify before South Africa's Truth and Reconciliation Commission about anti-apartheid crimes. Judge Selikowitz (with whom Judge Foxcroft, concurred) upheld Botha's appeal on technical grounds and set aside his sentence of a 10,000 rand (pounds 1,000) fine or 12 months in jail for defying a truth commission subpoena. After a trial lasting months, a regional court convicted the former president of contempt for ignoring summonses to testify in person before the commission, which was trying to uncover the chain of command behind murders, bombings and the torture of anti-apartheid activists during his rule.

Botha was sentenced by a Black Regional Court President and when Selikowitz overturned the conviction on a technicality some South Africans were outraged. Some saw the decision as a catalyst to ignite racial tensions in South Africa as it was made on the eve of Nelson Mandela's departure from the Presidency.

In his judgment, reported as S v BOTHA 1999 (2) SACR 261 (C), Selikowitz stated at p. 271:

"I should like to record that this Court is mindful of the fact that there will be many who may consider that it is unjust that the appellant should succeed in his appeal upon the basis that the s 29(1)(c) notice issued by the TRC and served on him on 5 December 1997, was unauthorised because it was prematurely issued. Indeed, Mr Morrison submitted that this Court should not permit the appellant to take what he called 'technical points' because of the intransigent and obdurate attitude which the appellant had demonstrated towards the TRC. The TRC was established to perform a noble and invaluable task for our country. It remains, however, a statutory body clothed only with the powers that the Legislature has given it. This Court is duty-bound to uphold and protect the Constitution and to administer justice to all persons alike without fear, favour or prejudice, in accordance with the Constitution and the law. Suffice it to say that the same law, the same Constitution which obliges the appellant to obey the law of the land like every other citizen, also affords him the same protections that it affords every other citizen."

== Career at UNSW ==
In 2008, Selikowitz began teaching as a visiting Professorial Fellow at the University of New South Wales in Sydney, Australia. He taught courses in Contract, Tort, Insolvency and Equity and Trusts.

=== Hobbies and pastimes ===
Selikowitz's hobbies include wine collecting (and tasting); the outdoors (wildlife - animals and birds), walking on the slopes of Table Mountain., and watching the cricket.
