= Patricia Sulcas Kreiner =

South African politician

Patricia Sulcas Kreiner Fine

Mayor of Cape Town
- In office 1993–1995
- Preceded by: Clive Keegan
- Succeeded by: Theresa Solomons

Personal details
- Born: Patricia Faith Kahn
- Occupation: Politician

Patricia Sulcas Kreiner Fine was a former Mayor of Cape Town, serving from 1993 to 1995, during the country's transition from white-minority rule to a multi-racial democracy. Patricia welcomed President Nelson Mandela to Cape Town on the balcony of the City Hall on the morning of 10 May 1994, the days of his inauguration as President of the newly democratic South Africa that afternoon at Pretoria's Union Buildings.

After being elected as City Councillor for Cape Town's central business district, Patricia became the second woman to hold the position of Mayor after Joyce Newton-Thompson. She also became the first Jewish woman to hold the position. Her late husband Louis Kreiner previously held the position from 1979 to 1981, followed by her brother-in-law, Sol Kreiner, serving as mayor from 1983 to 1985.

During her Mayoral term, Patricia initiated Cape Town's sister city agreement with Atlanta in the United States. As the HIV/AIDS epidemic began to devastate the lives of many South Africans, she showed solidarity by attending the funerals of people who had died of AIDS-related illnesses, including many within Cape Town's gay community.

Patricia was married to Norman Sulcas, with whom she had three children, Roslyn, Lorne, and Adele. She later married Louis Kreiner, who died in 1994. In 2001, Patricia married Leo Fine.

In her later years, Patricia was a committed charitable contributor and participant in several local non-profit organisations and Jewish benevolent organisations. She was an active and engaged Board Member of Cape Town City Ballet, and a benefactor of the arts, particularly dance, until her death on 1 March 2025, from a form of blood cancer.
