= Leon Markovitz =

South African politician

Mayor of Cape Town
- In office 1985–1987
- Preceded by: Sol Kreiner
- Succeeded by: Peter Muller

Personal details
- Born: 1937
- Died: 16 July 2005
- Spouse: Anthula Markovitz
- Children: 6
- Occupation: Politician, hotelier

Leon Markovitz (1937 – 16 July 2005) was a South African politician and hotelier, he served as Mayor of Cape Town between 1985 and 1987. In the 1990s he was the National Party leader in the council. He subsequently served as Finance Minister of the Western Cape and as a fundraiser for the Democratic Alliance (DA).

As mayor in 1986, he was the senior official present at Desmond Tutu's installation as the first black Archbishop to lead the Anglican Church of Southern Africa. He also operated a hospitality business and owned the Ambassador Hotel in Bantry Bay in Cape Town.

He was also a benefactor of Jewish organisations and causes such as the Cape Town Holocaust Centre.
