= William Bantom =

South African politician

Rev. William Bantom (born 1946?) was mayor of Cape Town from 1995 to 2000. He was the city's first black mayor. He was elected in the first non-racial local government elections in 1995.

He was forced to resign as mayor and expelled from the New National Party in 2000 as a result of breaching company policies regarding appropriate use of work devices.

He is a minister in the Church of the Nazarene.

Preceded by Patricia Kreiner	Mayor of Cape Town; 1995–2000	Succeeded by Peter Marais
