= Petrus Kotzé =

South African politician

Mayor of Cape Town
- In office 1879–1881
- Preceded by: Jan Christoffel Hofmeyr
- Succeeded by: William Flemming

Personal details
- Born: Petrus Johannes Kotzé; 10 May 1810 Bloubergstrand, Cape Colony
- Died: 28 September 1888 (aged 78) Cape Town, Cape Colony
- Spouse: Susanna Maria Blanckenberg

Petrus Johannes Kotzé (10 May 1810 – 28 September 1888) was Mayor of Cape Town and member of the Parliament of the Cape of Good Hope.

== Biography ==
Kotzé received his education in Cape Town and initially found himself in the business world, but on medical advice decided to start farming. In 1839 he bought a section of the Leeuwenhof estate, next to Hof Street in Cape Town, from Joseph Upjohn. In 1848 the owner of the other section of Leeuwenhof, Christoffel Brand, went insolvent which enabled Kotzé to buy that section as well. He began to cultivate the vineyards and orchards on the land and also established an impressive garden.

Kotzé was one of the members for Cape Town on the Cape Legislative Assembly from 1859 to 1863 and 1866 to 1868. From 1879 to 1881 he was Mayor of Cape Town, and Kotzé Street in Gardens, Cape Town is named after him. He married Susanna Maria Blanckenberg and there were two sons and four daughters, born from the marriage. Both of his sons played prominent roles in Southern African society. The eldest son, J. J. Kotzé became the reverend of the Dutch Reformed Church of Darling, and the second son, John Gilbert Kotzé became chief justice of the Transvaal Republic.
