= Richard Friedlander (mayor) =

Former Mayor of Cape Town between 1971 and 1973

Mayor of Cape Town
- In office 1971–1973
- Preceded by: Jan Dommisse
- Succeeded by: David Bloomberg

Personal details
- Born: Richard Martin Friedlander; 20 January 1923 Cape Town, South Africa
- Died: 8 February 2007 (aged 84) Cape Town, South Africa
- Spouse: Phyllis Friedlander
- Children: 3
- Occupation: Lawyer, politician

Richard Friedlander (20 January 1923 – 8 February 2007) was a South African attorney and politician. He served as Mayor of Cape Town from 1971 to 1973. As chairman of the City Council's executive committee in 1989, he led a motion requesting the national government to exempt Cape Town from the Group Areas Act.
