= The Lantern (Cape newspaper) =

Weekly newspaper in South Africa

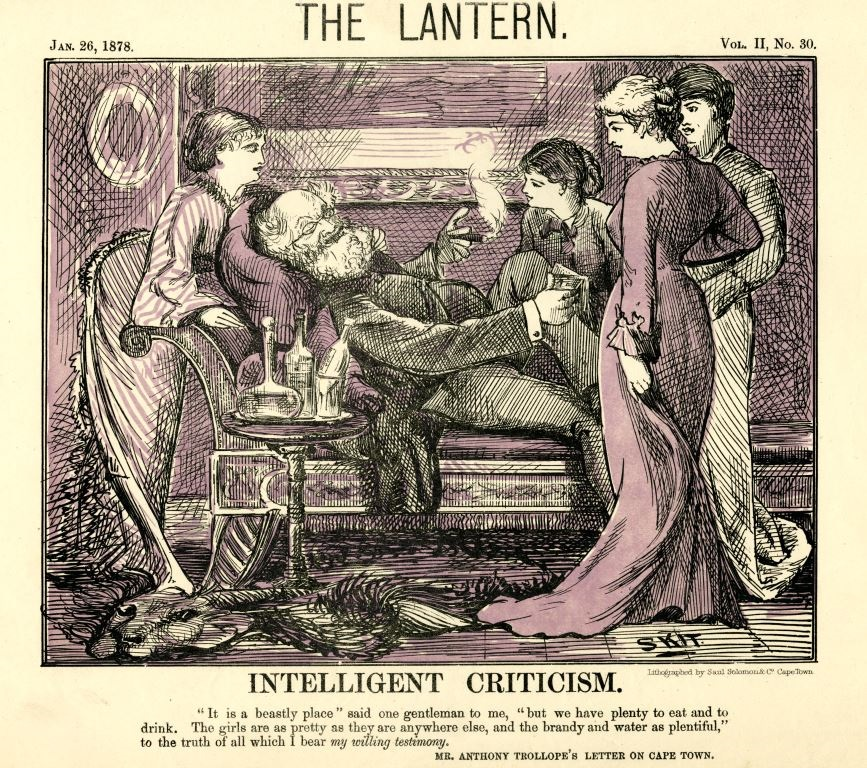
- Editorial cartoon published by The Lantern in January 1878
- Type: Weekly newspaper
- Format: Broadsheet
- Owner(s): Alfred A. Geary; Thomas McCombie
- Founded: 1877; 148 years ago
- Ceased publication: ~1889
- Headquarters: Cape Town
- Country: Cape Colony

The Lantern (also known as the Cape Lantern) was a weekly newspaper published in the Cape Colony between 1877 and c. 1889. Featuring a populist and pro-imperial slant, The Lantern was one of the first South African newspapers to publish political cartoons. For the duration of the paper's existence, it remained dwarfed in popularity by more well-established papers such as the Cape Argus and The Times.

== History ==
The Lantern was established by English immigrant Alfred A. Geary in 1877, and was targeted towards Anglophone white South Africans, who were mostly of British descent. Reflecting its readership, the paper typically adopted a populist and pro-imperial stance, supporting the colonial expansion of the British Empire in southern Africa and closer ties between Britain and the Cape Colony. After Geary died of illness in 1880, The Lantern was taken over by Irishman Thomas McCombie, "an erratic writer and no businessman."

The Lantern, being a right-wing newspaper, frequently denounced liberal politicians in the colonial Parliament such as Saul Solomon and John Charles Molteno along with opposing the expansion of the Cape Qualified Franchise. Much as the discontinued paper The Zingari had done, The Lantern published political cartoons covering a wide range of topics in colonial society. Notable cartoonists which illustrated cartoons for The Lantern included William Howard Schröder, Hugh Fisher, Erling D. Haslam, Henry Mills, Alpine Menzies and Vane Bennett.

By the mid 1880s, The Lantern started to encounter serious financial difficulties. Beset with debts, McCombie shut down the paper c. 1889 and moved to the Transvaal and started publishing a new paper titled the Transvaal Truth. However, McCombie continued to face financial issues, including an inability to meet his monetary engagements; after the Transval Truth failed, McCombie moved back to Cape Town where he eventually drowned in the Salt River.
