= William Howard Schröder =

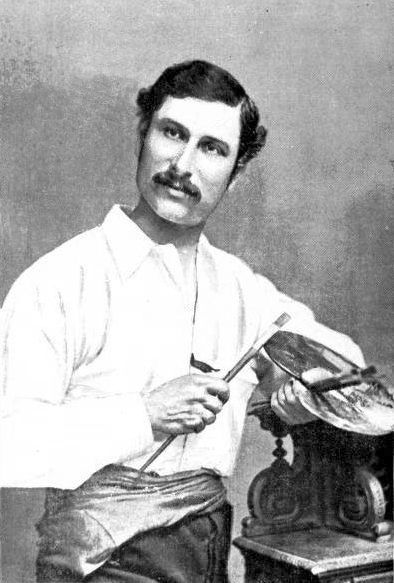

William Howard Schröder (c. 1851 Cape Town - 4 August 1892 Pretoria), was a South African artist, cartoonist and publisher.

Schroder was the eldest in a family of 4 sons and 6 daughters. Never a robust child, he preferred the company of a book or drawing materials to that of his peers. His first schooling was at Tot Nut van 't Algemeen in Cape Town, and there came under the mentorship of Charles Fanning, the art master. Charles Fanning, though a competent teacher, was of as retiring a nature as Willie, declining to sell his work for fear of exciting jealousy and resentment on the part of other artists.

At the age of 14, Schröder was compelled by his family's straitened circumstances to leave school and work for a photo colourist, becoming proficient at this art. Later he was employed by a photographer, S. B. Barnard, for some twelve years during which period he attended evening classes in art, first studying under Thomas Lindsay of the Roeland Street School of Art, and later under Lindsay's successor, W. McGill.

Schröder started regularly contributing cartoons and caricatures to newspapers and periodicals. One of his first works was a portrait of James Barry for The Zingari in 1871. He worked for the Zingari until it closed in 1875.

John Schröder, his father, died of dropsy in 1872 after a lifetime of abstaining from spirits and tobacco. The burden of responsibility for the family's welfare naturally fell on the eldest son. Schröder now started giving art classes and painting portraits.

He briefly worked for the Cape Town-based publication The Lantern, starting from when it opened in 1877, before moving to Port Elizabeth for a few years to work for The Observer newspaper in 1878.

His cartoons were used by the Cape Argus, Het Volksblad, The Lantern, Excalibur and his own weekly The Knobkerrie. He moved to the Transvaal in 1889 where after working on several journals, he joined The Press in Pretoria.

== Bibliography ==
- online The Schröder Art Memento (1893) - Leo Weinthal (editor)
