= The Zingari =

Former South African newspaper

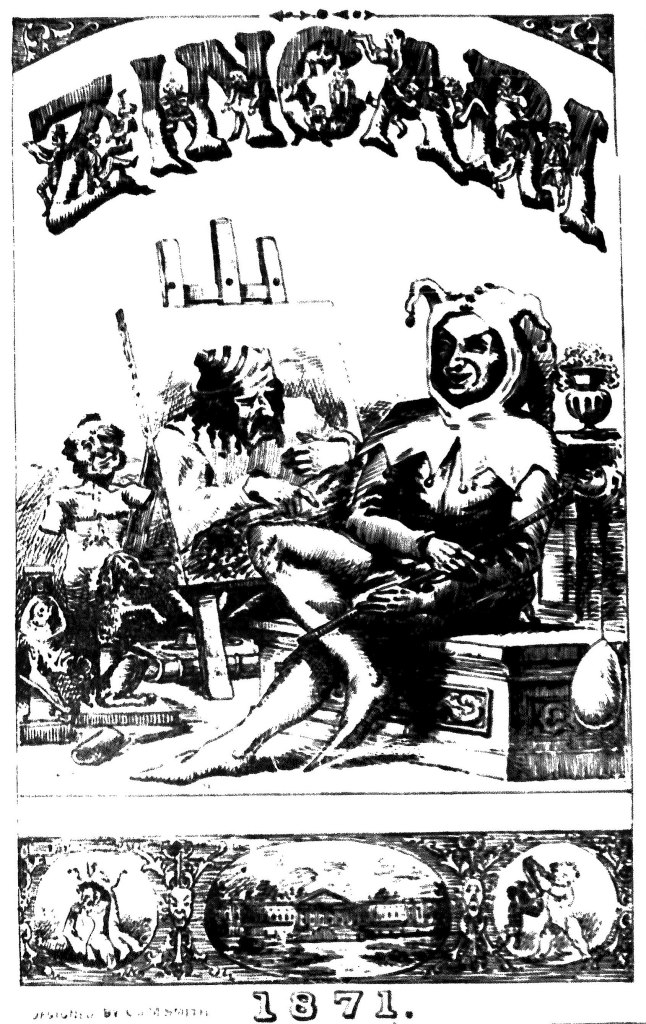
Front cover of an early Zingari edition.

The Zingari was an early weekly newspaper of the Cape Colony, which printed in Cape Town from 1870 until 1875. It was a low-brow, semi-humorous paper that never attained a wide circulation, but was notable for featuring some of the first satirical cartoons in southern Africa. It was also an overtly pro-imperialist publication, appealing to the right wing of the political spectrum of the time.

== Publication ==
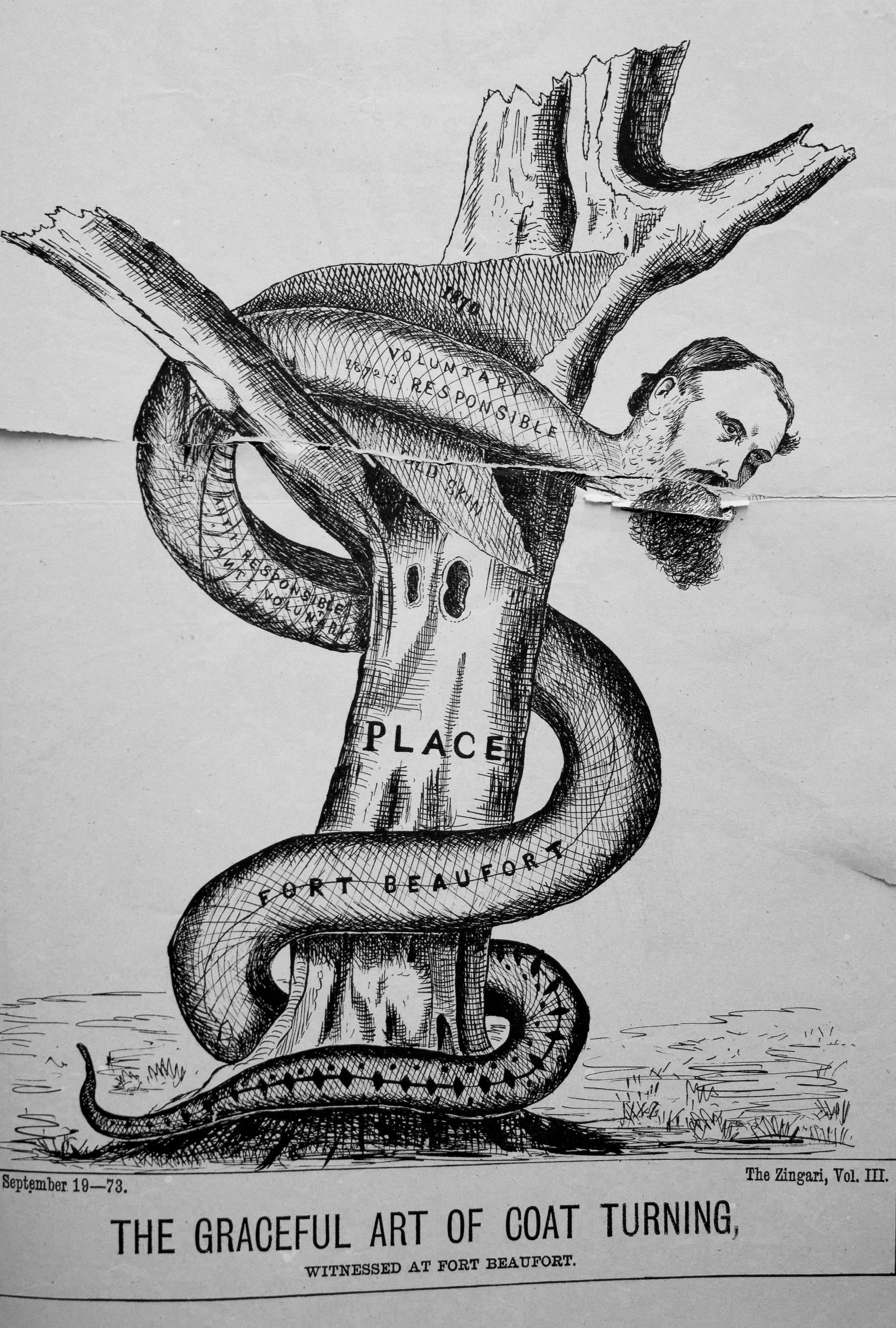
Cartoon attacking Mr John Quin, one of the many local politician who converted to the movement for Responsible Government.

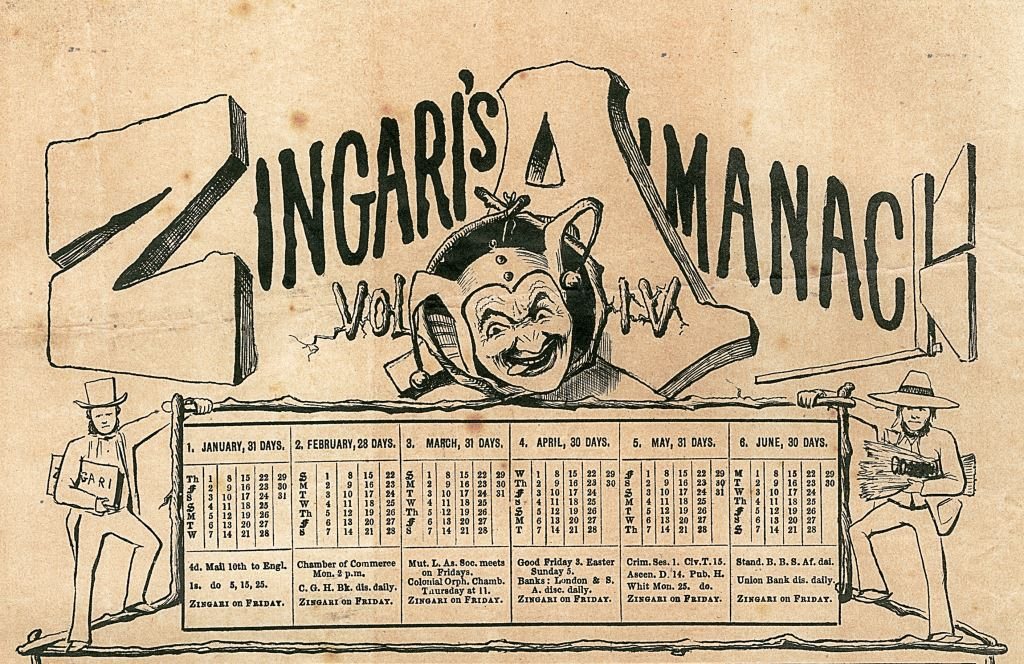

The Zingari was founded by Charles Cowen, who was to be the newspaper's editor for the duration of its publication. The first run was beset with technical problems, and only 300 copies were printed. Cowen therefore approached the large and established printing house of Saul Solomon, the owner of the mainstream Cape Argus newspaper. Solomon permitted the use of his printing house though, as a liberal MP himself, he was often the main figure attacked by the Zingari in its sketches and columns.

The name, "Zingari", is a dialectal Italian word meaning "Gypsies", but in its sketches the paper always represented itself with the character of a medieval jester.

== Political stance ==
The Zingari took a strongly reactionary, pro-imperialist stance, in opposition to the mainstream newspapers such as the Cape Argus and The South African Commercial Advertiser (which both tended to favour local self-government and an expansion of the multi-racial Cape Qualified Franchise).

It was one of the few publications which opposed the movement for "Responsible Government" (locally elected democracy) which it accused of being "crafts and assaults of the devil" which would bring about a "great conflagration". When the movement's leader came to power in 1872, the Zingari became one of the most extreme voices of opposition against the local government, and in favour of a stronger British imperial presence in southern Africa.

== Editorial cartoons ==
The Zingari was notable for featuring some of the earliest examples of political cartoons in southern Africa. Its first few editions were illustrated with sketches by CJM Smith and William McGill, but McGill's young student, William Howard Schröder, took over as cartoonist in 1871.

Under Cowen's direction, Schröder also initiated a portrait gallery of the influential figures of the country at the time. Each edition featured a portrait and biography at the back, beginning in June 1871 with the leader of the House of Assembly John Molteno.
