= Nelson Mandela Artillery Regiment =

Reserve artillery regiment of the South African Army

Cape Town Volunteer Artillery Cape Field Artillery Nelson Mandela Artillery Regiment
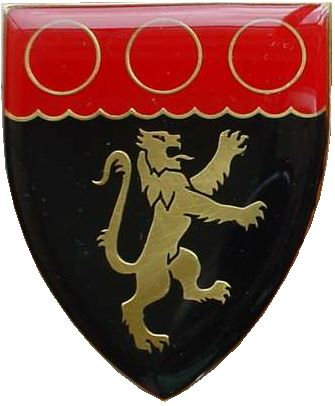
- SANDF Cape Field Artillery emblem
- Active: 26 August 1857 to present
- Country: South Africa
- Allegiance: Republic of South Africa; Republic of South Africa
- Branch: South African Army; South African Army
- Type: Reserve Artillery
- Role: Field Artillery
- Part of: South African Army Artillery Formation; Army Conventional Reserve
- Garrison/HQ: Fort iKapa
- Mottos: Ubique (Everywhere); Quo Fas Et Gloria Ducunt (Whither right or glory); Spes Bona (Good Hope)
- Anniversaries: 26 August (Regimental Day)
- Artillery Guns: GV5 Luiperd 155mm Towed Howitzer, GV1 25-pounder (Ceremonial)

Commanders
- Current Commanding Officer: Lieutenant Colonel L.G. Claassen
- Second in Command (2IC): Captain V.L. Jensen

Insignia
- Collar Badge: Bursting grenade with seven flames
- Beret Colour: Oxford Blue
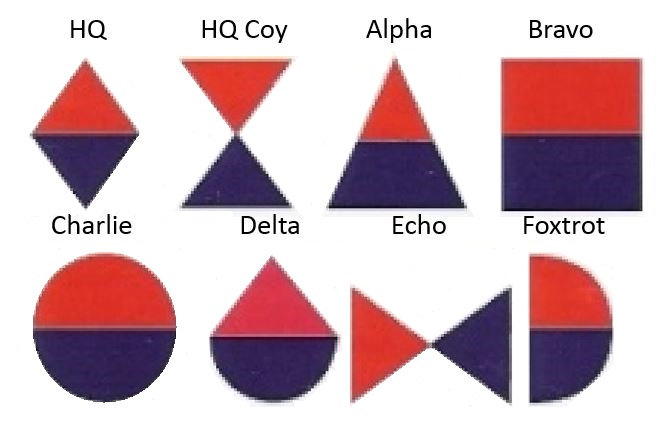
- Artillery Battery Emblems

- Artillery Beret Bar circa 1992
- Abbreviation: NMAR

The Nelson Mandela Artillery Regiment (formerly the Cape Field Artillery) is a reserve artillery regiment of the South African Army and part of the South African Army Artillery Formation.

== History ==
=== Origins ===
After news of the Indian Mutiny reached Sir George Grey, Governor of the Cape, he sent every available military unit in the Cape Garrison to India which left the Cape's military forces badly depleted of manpower. The volunteers of the Cape Royal Corps soon found themselves drilling on the guns stationed in Table Bay. As a result of their work on these batteries the Cape Town Volunteer Artillery (CVA) was born on 26 August 1857 at the old Town house in Greenmarket Square, Cape Town.

The regiment is one of the oldest volunteer artillery regiments in the world still in existence today, after it celebrated its 160th anniversary on 26 August 2017. Major Duprat (Chevalier Alfredo Duprat; 21 June 1810 in Lisbon, Conceição Nova – 24 August 1881 in London, Kensington) was the first Commanding Officer. In 1867 the Duke of Edinburgh was escorted to Cape Town from Simonstown by the Cape Town Cavalry and upon his arrival the Cape Town Volunteer Artillery, drawn up on Caledon Square, fired a Royal Salute as he passed towards Adderley Street. The great occasion of the royal visit was on 24 August, when the Prince laid the foundation stone of the graving dock and the CVO thundered out again in salute on the laying of the stone.

The Duke of Edinburgh was so impressed with the bearing of Cape Town's volunteer soldiers that, a few weeks later on 3 October 1867, a Government Notice No 318 was promulgated to the effect that he had conferred on the gunners the future designation of Prince Alfred's Own Cape Town Volunteer Artillery (PAOCTVA). The words "Cape Town" were later dropped, and the title became Prince Alfred's Own Volunteer Artillery. In 1896, the title was changed again, to Prince Alfred's Own Cape Artillery.

The unit served in several regional campaigns, including the 9th Frontier War of 1877 - 1879 and the Tambookie Campaign of 1880 - 1881 on the Eastern Cape frontier, then the Basutoland Rebellion in Basutoland and the Second Anglo-Boer War of 1899 - 1902.

In 1903, the title was changed to Prince Alfred's Own Cape Field Artillery. Ten years later, in 1913, the unit was embodied in the Citizen Force of the new Union Defence Forces as the 6th Citizen Battery (PAOCFA).

=== World War I ===
Although the Regiment did not serve on the European continent during World War I, it did take part in the South-West Africa Campaign. The regiment was mobilised for war in August 1914. They spent three months with General Louis Botha's forces to suppress the Maritz Rebellion, after which they were sent to Upington where they acted as garrison troops while waiting to join Col van Deventer's Southern Force to move into German South-West Africa. Here they carried out patrols in the region and the artillery guns fought the Germans during a small action at Schuits Drift. While they were garrisoned in Upington the Republican Rebel, Manie Maritz, attempted to attack the town with a force of rebels accompanied by a battery of German artillery guns and two QF 1-pounder pom-poms. After a four-hour battle the rebels surrendered.

The unit also took part in the South African invasion of German South-West Africa in 1915 where it earned the battle honour "South West Africa 1915".

The battery was renumbered "1st" in 1926. In 1932, the name was changed to Cape Field Artillery (Prince Alfred's Own). From 1934 until the outbreak of World War II in 1939, the CFA formed part of the Coast Artillery Brigade.

=== World War II ===
The Cape Field Artillery was reorganised as the 1st Field Brigade (CFA) in February 1940 and in January 1941, 1 Field Regiment (V), South African Artillery (PAOCFA). It fought during Operation Crusader at Bardia, Sollum, Halfaya Pass and at Gazala during the Battle of Gazala. 2 Field Battery was lost during the fall of Tobruk in June 1942, when the 1st Field Brigade (CFA) fought as part of the South African 2nd Infantry Division under the command of General Hendrik Klopper. It fired the first and last rounds before the Fortress at Tobruk surrendered on 21 June 1942.

1 and 3 Field Batteries, joined by 14 Field Battery, fought in the First Battle of El Alamein in July 1942 and in the Second Battle of El Alamein that lasted between 23 October to 11 November 1942, as part of 1st South African Division. On one day during the first battle the three batteries fired over 9000 shells to break up several German attacks. After these engagements the regiment returned to South Africa briefly in December 1942.

The regiment returned to North Africa in 1943 where it merged with 6th Field Regiment to form 1/6 Field Regiment (V), South African Artillery (PAOCFA). It joined the South African 6th Armoured Division and moved to Italy in April 1944 where it fought in the Battle of Monte Cassino and all the other battles and engagements in which the 6th Armoured division were involved.

=== Post-War ===
The units title was changed again, in 1960, to Regiment Tygerberg. This title, imposed on the regiment, was not popular, and in 1963 it was changed back to Cape Field Artillery, but without the princely style, which was no longer appropriate as South Africa had become a republic.

During the post-war period the regiment was mobilised several times for duty in the South African Border War (1966 to 1989), including Operation Savannah in 1976. In August/September 1988 the Cape Field Artillery provided a 140 millimetres (5.5 in) battery for 10 Artillery Brigade in order to counter Cuban Forces who were threatening the South-West African Border.

== Role in the 21st Century ==
Currently the regiment is classed as a reserve unit in the South African Army. Members of the Nelson Mandela Artillery Regiment regularly undergo refresher training to maintain physical fitness levels and to ensure that they remain well versed with the R4 assault rifle. Members are also required to receive training in computer literacy.

To qualify as an artillery gunner in the Nelson Mandela Artillery Regiment, members receive three weeks of decentralised training from the School of Artillery at Fort iKapa in the use of the GV5 Luiperd 155mm Towed Howitzer.

The regiment also fulfils many ceremonial duties. Its Ceremonial Gun Troop maintains several GV1, 25 pounder guns which it fires on certain occasions such as during the annual Opening of Parliament in central Cape Town, the annual Gun Run and the annual Robertson Agricultural Show.

As part of the opening of the 2010 FIFA World Cup, the Ceremonial Gun Troop fired its 25-pounder guns on Friday 11 June at 18:00 in front of the Castle of Good Hope. The guns were fired once more on Sunday 11 June at 18:40 in front of the Castle, marking the final day of the 2010 World Cup. During the course of the 2010 FIFA World Cup, Staff Sergeant Andrew Imrie of the Cape Field Artillery Pipes and Drums played 'Nightfall in Camp' from the Leerdam Bastion.

The regiment has received the Freedom of Bellville and of the City of Cape Town, a mark of honour that permits military units to parade through the city streets with fixed bayonets, drawn swords, drums beating and colours flying on all ceremonial and other occasions.

=== Name Change ===
In August 2019, 52 Reserve Force units had their names changed to reflect the diverse military history of South Africa. The Cape Field Artillery became the Nelson Mandela Artillery Regiment, and have 3 years to design and implement new regimental insignia. The new title was in honor of the man who for many was the symbol of the long battle for a diverse South Africa for over three decades and later own assumed not just the presidency of the republic but also became the first modern commander in chief of the SANDF.

== Regimental Symbols ==
- The NMAR has received the Freedom of Cape Town.
- The NMAR claims to be the oldest volunteer artillery regiment in the world that is still in existence.
- Regimental mottos: Ubique (Everywhere), Quo Fas Et Gloria Ducunt (Whither right or glory), Spes Bona (Good Hope).

=== Dress Insignia ===
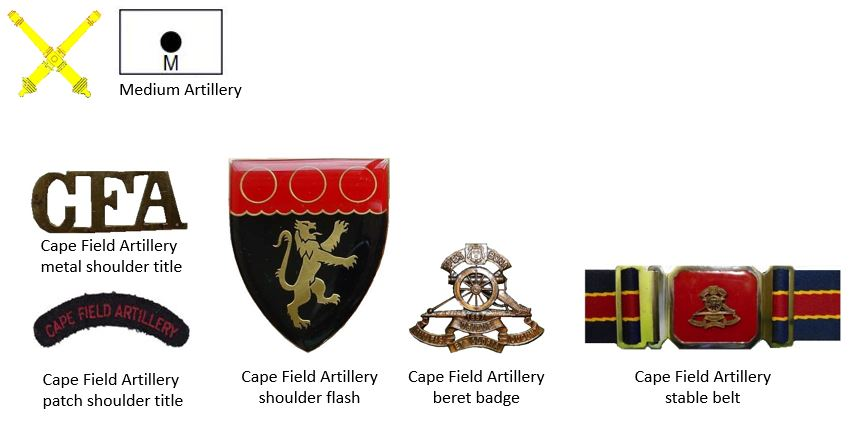
SADF era Cape Field Artillery insignia

== Battle honours ==
Although artillery units in the South African Army do not usually receive battle honours, the CFA was awarded the honour

- South-West Africa 1915

Battle Honours
Awarded to Cape Field Artillery
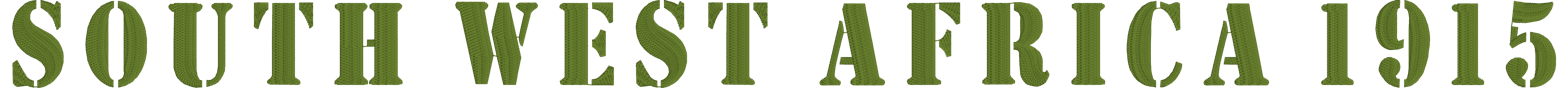

== Leadership ==
Cape Field Artillery Leadership
From	Honorary Colonels	To	Ribbon
nd	unknown	Present	
From	Commanding Officers	To	Ribbon
26.8.1857	Lt -Col the Chevalier A. du Prat	20.5.1862	
21.5.1862	Capt P.A. Brand	11.4.1872	
12.4.1872	Capt J. Hopkirk (acting until 29.10.1872)	25.8.1875	
26.8.1875	Lt T.J.C. Inglesby	9.10.1877	
10.10.1877	Lt -Col the Hon Richard Southey CMG	19.11.1890	Order of St Michael and St George CMG
20.11.1890	Maj P.J. Stigant	7.12.1890	
8.12.1890	Lt -Col R.A. Lanning	20.3.1892	
21.3.1892	Maj W. McLachlan	7.6.1892	
8.6.1892	Lt -Col T.J.J. Inglesby VD	30.6.1908	Colonial Auxiliary Forces Officers' Decoration VD
1.7.1908	Maj (Brevet Lt-Col) F.W. Divine VD	27.4.1919	Colonial Auxiliary Forces Officers' Decoration VD
29.4.1919	Maj (Brevet Lt-Col) C.H.F. Divine DSO,VD	7.1.1921	Distinguished Service Order DSO Colonial Auxiliary Forces Officers' Decoration VD
8.10.1921	Lt G. Backwell	2.8.1922	
3.8.1922	Maj R.D. Pilkington-Jordan ED	14.8.1932	Efficiency Decoration (South Africa) ED
15.8.1932	Capt A.S. Mehan VD	30.9.1935	Colonial Auxiliary Forces Officers' Decoration VD
1.10.1935	Capt P. Inglesby	31.8.1939	
1.9.1939	Maj W.R. de Smidt	4.1.1940	
5.1.1940	Lt -Col P. Inglesby ED	29.3.1940	Efficiency Decoration (South Africa) ED
30.3.1940	Maj W.R. de Smidt	29.5.1940	
30.5.1940	Maj C.R. Divine	11.6.1940	
12.6.1940	Maj H.T. Calvert	8.9.1940	
9.9.1940	Maj J.L. Atkinson	24.9.1940	
25.9.1940	Lt -Col L. du Toil	30.1.1942	
31.1.1942	Maj C.J.N. Lever	7.2.1942	
	Cmdt E. Bester		
	Lt Col C.A. (Kees) de Haan		
01.4.2020	Lt Col L.G. Claassen	Present	
From	Regimental Sergeants Major	To	Ribbon
	MWO B. Havenga	Present	

== Armament ==
- hand drawn 12 pounder brass ML
- 6-pounder brass ML
- 7-pounder RML
- 12-pounder RBL
- 15-pounder RBL
- 15-pounder BLC
- 18-pounder QF
- GV1 25-pounders
- GV5 Luiperd 155mm Towed Howitzer

== Weapons ==
- Swords
- Tranter revolvers
- Martini-Henry carbines
- Turner rifle
- Snider cavalry carbines
- Snider rifles
- Wesley Richards BL carbines
- R4 assault rifle

== See also ==
- GV1 25-pounders

== Bibliography ==
- Orpen, Neil D. (1965). Gunners of the Cape: the story of the Cape Field Artillery. CFA Regimental History Committee.
- History of Cape Field Artillery.
