= United Herzlia Schools =

Jewish education organization in South Africa

Location
- Deer Park Dr E, Vredehoek, Cape Town, 8001; Cape Town, South Africa, Western Cape
- Coordinates: 33°56′36.8″S 18°25′18.0″E

Information
- Other name: בתיה״ס המאוחדים הרצליה
- Motto: "אם תרצו" ("If you will it, it is no dream")
- Denomination: Orthodox Judaism
- Established: 1940

The United Herzlia Schools is an organisation that manages the delivery of separate Jewish education in Cape Town in South Africa. The most prominent school is Herzlia High School, which has over 2,000 students. The school caters to Jewish students across the religious spectrum, from Orthodox to Reform and unaffiliated. The school also enrols non-Jewish pupils from other faith backgrounds.

== History ==
One of the earliest Jewish schools was the Hope Mill Hebrew Public School which was located at the top of Government Avenue, close to the Cape Town Hebrew Congregation. By 1901 it had about 350 students. The school received state assistance from the Cape school board and the school gradually lost its Jewish character.

A Talmud Torah school was established in District Six in 1899 and by 1903 it housed 100 pupils. In 1919, the United Hebrew Schools of Cape Town were established. The school was housed at 101 Hope Street under the principalship of Mr Joseph Homa.

With the arrival of Rabbi Abrahams as Chief Rabbi of the Cape Town Hebrew Congregation, the idea of the Jewish Day School was given new impetus. The first class, which was housed at 101 Hope Street, Cape Town, opened in January 1940.

The first parent committee was established in August 1940 to help stimulate parental support. Thus began the long tradition of active commitment on the part of the parents.

In 1945, it was decided to give the morning school a separate identity from The Hope Street Talmud Torah. It was subsequently given the name Herzlia By 1948, with 225 on the roll and six standards, the problem of space prompted the committee to purchase four and a half acres of land in Highlands Estate but building only began many years later.

In 1955, the school went up to Std 9 with 423 pupils and Myer Katz was appointed Head of Herzlia. Construction began on the Highlands plot. In 1956, the four foundation stones were laid by; Chief Rabbi Professor Abrahams, Max Rabie, Ben Wilder and the fourth (in memory of the late Jacob Gitlin) by Meyer H Goldschmidt.

On 29 April 1957, 560 Herzlians assembled in the new school hall for the first time, The number of pupils soon approached 1000 and a new preparatory school block was built as well as a hostel (currently Highlands Primary) that enabled the country pupils to obtain a Jewish education. They came from as far afield as Upington and Zambia.

In 1976, the Kindergarten classes of Highlands Primary moved into the building which previously housed the school hostel and the upper primary classes joined them in 1978. In 1972, the first sod was turned on the ten acres of land in Kendal Road, Constantia and on 17 July 1973 the completed building was handed over to the new governing body of the school.

Weizmann Primary joined the Herzlia system in 1976 and so it was at that point that the Jewish Day School movement in Cape Town was unified. In 1981 the Middle School was erected on what was previously the school sports field.

== Herzlia Schools 2000-2010 ==
Many changes occurred at the schools over the decade up to 2010, including significant changes to the national curriculum and the matriculation examinations.

During 2000, the United Herzlia Schools merged with the Association of Hebrew Pre-Primary Schools. Herzlia has opened playgroups for younger children and also consolidated some of its campuses, integrating the preschools into its schools in the Atlantic and Southern Suburbs regions. The Herzlia Pre-Primary schools are situated in four suburbs of Cape Town, serving families closest to their homes. Herzlia has also absorbed the Sarah Bloch crèche, which provides an aftercare service to families in the area.

The schools are managed in regions by regional principals with the majority of children attending school in the City Bowl region. The Director of Education has direct educational responsibility for all Herzlia schools educationally and is also the public face of Herzlia, while finance and administration is headed by the Director of Finance and Administration who is seated in the administration house.

== School Campuses ==
United Herzlia schools is a School Group that executively runs in Cape Town. Herzlia Pre Primary to Herzlia High School campuses. Campuses that are included in the Herzlia school group are as follows.

- Pre-Primary: 18 Months - Grade R
  - Herzlia Gan Aviv (City Bowl)
  - Herzlia Alon Ashel (Sea Point)
- Primary: Grade 1 - 6
  - Herzlia Highlands (City Bowl)
  - Herzlia Weizmann (Sea Point)
- High school: Grade 7 - 12
  - Herzlia High school (City Bowl)

== Controversies ==
Both the South African and Israeli national anthems are traditionally sung at school events. In November 2018, during the singing of the Israeli anthem during the prize-giving event of the former Herzlia middle school, two Jewish Grade 9 students "took a knee" to protest the Israel government's treatment of Palestinians. In the following days after the students' protest, the UHS board imposed disciplinary action against the two students.

On the 25th of November 2018, in response to the news of disciplinary action being taken against two grade nine learners, a group of Herzlia alumni penned a two-page letter titled “Herzlia Alumni Support Freedom of Thought and Peaceful Expression of Dissent”.

== Notable alumni ==
Herzlia's 7204 alumni are located in all corners of the world. Currently the alumni are spread as follows: 897 live in the United States of America, 212 in Canada, 578 in the United Kingdom, 654 in Israel, 643 in Australia, 25 in New Zealand while the balance live in South Africa and a few other smaller destinations.

- Saul Dubow, Smuts Professor of Commonwealth History at the University of Cambridge
- Sir Peter Gross member of the Court of Appeal of England and Wales.
- Prof Emanuel Derman quantitative analyst, and author of the book My Life as a Quant: Reflections on Physics and Finance
- Dr Mitchel Besser HIV activist and husband of Annie Lennox
- Dr Michael Hayden Killam Professor of Medical Genetics at the University of British Columbia and Canada Research Chair in Human Genetics and Molecular Medicine.
- Louis Kreiner, former mayor of Cape Town
- Sol Kreiner, former mayor of Cape Town
- Ruth Wasserman Lande diplomat, lecturer and social activist
- Rabbi Ephraim Mirvis, Chief Rabbi of the United Hebrew Congregations of the Commonwealth, studied at the school between 1968 and 1973
- Dr Amanda Weltman theoretical physicist
- Gary Schneider photographer known for his portraiture and self-portraits
- Anton Fig notable drummer for David Letterman and others
- Lisa Swerling artist
- Allan Kolski Horwitz poet
- Selwyn Selikowitz former Cape High Court Judge
- Rabbi Barry Marcus, Rabbi of the Central Synagogue, Great Portland Street in London
