= Sol Kreiner =

South African politician, Mayor of Cape Town from 1983 to 1985

Mayor of Cape Town
- In office 1983–1985
- Preceded by: M.J. van Zyl
- Succeeded by: Leon Markovitz

Personal details
- Born: 1939/1940 Grabouw, Cape Province, South Africa
- Spouse: Brenda Shap
- Children: Howard, Steven & Caryn
- Occupation: Politician

Sol Kreiner is a retired South African politician who served as Mayor of Cape Town between 1983 and 1985. At the time of his inauguration, he was the city's second-youngest mayor. His late brother, Louis Kreiner (1928–1994) also served as Mayor of Cape Town between 1979 and 1981.

== Early life ==
He was born and raised Grabouw in the Cape Province to a Jewish family. His late grandfather, Eliezer had been a rabbi in Poland. His father Chaim was deeply involved in the local Jewish community in Grabouw and held Shabbat services at the family home for the seven other Jewish families living in the town. Kreiner is fluent in Afrikaans from having attended an Afrikaans-language school, he also attended Herzlia as a boarder, a Jewish school in Cape Town. Prior to his entry into politics, he was the owner and director of a textile distribution company.

== Career ==
He entered political life in 1976 as a ward councilor for Cape Town's Ward 8, where he represented Woodstock, District Six, Walmer Estate and Salt River. He rallied against a recommendation by the Theron Commission that Salt River and Woodstock be rezoned for coloured residents. Prior to becoming Mayor of Cape Town, he served as Deputy Mayor.

During his political career in Cape Town he was very involved in the urban renewal of run-down areas of the city. He established the West City Action Committee, focusing on urban renewal and preservation in the city's historical districts. In 1983 he succeeded in convincing the national government to provide low-interest loans to homeowners to improve their homes. He also represented the council on the Cape Metropolitan Transport Advisory Board.

As Mayor, he advanced what would become the V&A Waterfront by forming a steering committee to consider a scheme for the waterfront: "As Johannesburg has gold, we have a beautiful city as a tourist attraction and we must all work together for a better Cape Town. We have a large cross-section of people who are prepared to sit down and discuss a scheme which will bring back the old city where one can freely walk around, visit the harbour, go for tug rides and learn more about our heritage." He also became the council-nominated director on the board of the Victoria and Alfred Waterfront Company.

In 1984, he told The New York Times that Cape Town was more racially inclusive than the country at large: "We as a Council have never erected an apartheid notice board... Our position is that all our amenities are open to all people." Kreiner had previously appealed for Woodstock Hospital to retain its access to all races.

After his mayoral term he attended several tours of the United States on behalf of the South African government, where he spoke to Jewish audiences about political reforms that were underway in apartheid-era South Africa.

== Personal life ==
He is married to Brenda Shap and they have three children together; Howard, Steven and Caryn. He has since emigrated to the United States with his wife, and they live in Chicago.
