= Otto Scott =

American journalist (1918–2006)

- Born: Otto Scott-Estrella Jr. May 26, 1918; New York City, U.S.
- Died: May 5, 2006 (aged 87); Issaquah, Washington, U.S.
- Occupations: Journalist; author
- Spouse: Anna Barney Scott
- Children: 4

Otto Scott (May 26, 1918 – May 5, 2006) was an American journalist and author of corporate histories who also wrote biographies on notable figures such as the abolitionist John Brown, James I of England, and Robespierre.

== Early life ==
Otto Joseph Scott was born Otto Scott-Estrella Jr. in New York City and was the son of a broker. Constantly troubled in his youth, he was unable to complete high school, yet with his initiative he was able to get work as a reporter for a newspaper in Fort Eustis, Virginia when he was 16 years old. He then worked for United Features Syndicate and the San Diego Union. When World War II broke out, he joined the United States Merchant Marine.

After the war, Scott worked in the advertising industry, then became editor of a manufacturing trade journal, Rubber World. In the course of his assignments, he interviewed Paul Blazer, the chairman of Ashland Oil, in Ashland, Kentucky, and was invited to write the history of the }company. "He changed my life because he gave me a new trade," Scott says of the company chairman. "I didn't know I could write a book." From this beginning he worked on books in his later years detailing the corporate histories of Raytheon, Black & Decker and Arch Mineral Corporation.

== Later life and conversion to Christianity ==
After writing biographies on notable figures in history, a major event occurred in his life which was his conversion to Christianity. Not a regular churchgoer by any stretch of the imagination, Otto said in an interview for Insight on the News that he read the Four Gospels in one night and was converted shortly thereafter.

In his later years, he worked for Chalcedon Foundation and went on to publish his own newsletter The Compass which commented on events in history and present-day cultural affairs. According to scholars Edward Sebesta and Euan Hague, Scott's contributions as a historian and activist were closely linked to Neo-Confederate Christian activists, and he was opposed to the historic abolitionist, civil rights, and anti-apartheid movements.

After suffering a fall in 2004 at his home near Portsmouth, New Hampshire, Otto returned to Federal Way, Washington to spend the last years of his life. He died in Issaquah, Washington on May 5, 2006.

Otto Scott is credited for inventing the phrase, made popular by President Richard Nixon, "the silent majority". Otto Scott wrote a speech for the CEO of Ashland Oil, "The Silent Majority", delivered to the Chicago Men's Club (May 23, 1968).

== Career highlights ==
- United Feature Syndicate, New York City, 1939–40
- Diamond & Sherwood, San Francisco, CA, 1948–53
- Globaltronix de Venezuela, Caracas, vice-president, 1954–56
- Mohr Associates, New York City, vice-president, 1957–59
- Becker, Scott & Associates, New York City, vice-president, 1960–63
- Rubber World, New York City, editor, 1964–67
- Ashland Oil, Inc., Ashland, KY, assistant to chair, 1968–69
- Compass Newsletter, 1993(?)–2005

== Family ==
Otto Scott was married three times. His last wife was Anna Barney Scott. Otto Scott had four daughters from his three marriages.
