= John Woodhead =

South African mayor

Sir John Woodhead
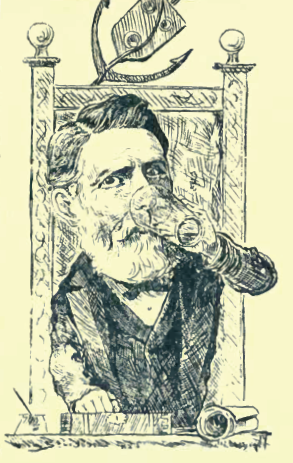
- Caricature of Sir John Woodhead in the Cape Lantern
- Born: John Woodhead; 22 January 1832; Huddersfield, England
- Died: 16 April 1898 (aged 66); Cape Town, Cape Colony
- Occupations: businessman and politician
- Spouse: Margaretta Maynard
- Children: Phoebe, Henry, Joseph and others

Sir John Woodhead (22 January 1832 – 16 April 1898) was four-times mayor of Cape Town and a local businessman.

== Life ==
Sir John was born in Huddersfield and married Margaretta Maynard in 1854 and immigrated to South Africa in 1861. After working for a tannery, he established his own leather goods company, Woodheads, in Cape Town in 1867. He was elected Mayor of Cape Town for four terms: 1886 – 1887, 1888 – 1889, 1893 – 1894 and 1896 – 1897. The Woodhead Dam and the Woodhead Tunnel on Table Mountain are both named after him. Sir John laid the last stone for the Woodhead Reservoir in 1897, and was knighted for his vision in promoting the project on 25 January 1897. He died on 16 April 1898 in Cape Town and is buried in Maitland Cemetery.

== Family ==
Sir John had a number of children, including Phoebe Henrietta (1870–1947) who married Wilfrid Murray (son of lexicographer Sir James Murray). Sir John had at least two sons: Henry Woodward and Joseph Maynard. Henry served in the Duke of Edinburgh's Own Rifles, a South African raised regiment that had served alongside Canadian troops in the South African War. A letter in the possession of the Canadian War Museum from Joseph, written on 13 June 1900, relates that Henry took command of the Duke of Edinburgh's Own Volunteer Rifles after the commanding officer was killed in action.
