= Mayor of Cape Town =

Head of the local government of Cape Town, South Africa

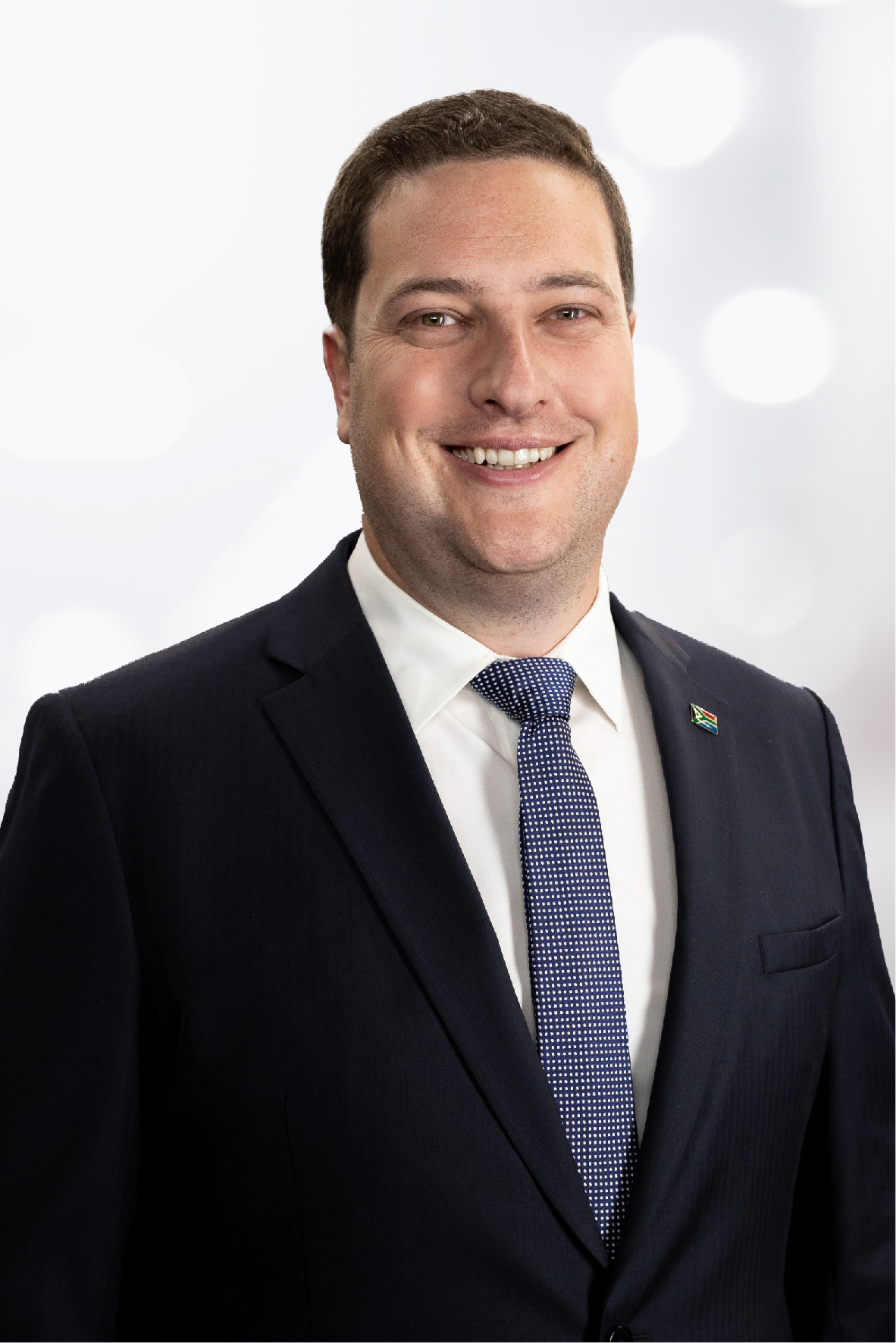
- Incumbent; Geordin Hill-Lewis since 18 November 2021
- Style: The Honourable
- Appointer: Cape Town City Council
- Term length: Five years; renewable once consecutively
- Inaugural holder: Michiel van Breda
- Formation: 1840; 186 years ago
- Website: Official Website

The mayor of Cape Town is the head of the local government of Cape Town, South Africa. Currently, that government takes the form of the City of Cape Town metropolitan municipality. The metro is administered by the Cape Town City Council, by which the mayor is appointed.

The mayoral position was established on 7 December 2000.

In the past, the position of mayor has varied between that of an executive mayor actively governing the city and that of a figurehead mayor with a mostly ceremonial role. The current mayor is Geordin Hill-Lewis of the Democratic Alliance (DA), who has held the position since 2021.

== Current office ==
This is a list of mayors of Cape Town in South Africa:

=== City of Cape Town (December 2000–present) ===
Name and Image	Term of office		Political party
Peter Marais	December 2000	November 2001	Democratic Alliance
Gerald Morkel	December 2001	October 2002	Democratic Alliance
Nomaindia Mfeketo	October 2002	March 2006	African National Congress
Helen Zille	March 2006	April 2009	Democratic Alliance
Grant Haskin (acting)	April 2009	May 2009	African Christian Democratic Party
Dan Plato	May 2009	May 2011	Democratic Alliance
Patricia de Lille	June 2011	October 2018	Democratic Alliance
Ian Neilson (acting)	May 2018; October 2018	May 2018; November 2018	Democratic Alliance
Dan Plato	November 2018	October 2021	Democratic Alliance
Geordin Hill-Lewis	November 2021	Incumbent	Democratic Alliance

== Historic offices ==
=== Metropolitan Local Councils (June 1996–December 2000) ===
==== Cape Metropolitan Council (CMC) ====
- Attie Adriaanse (2000) (NNP)
- Rev William Bantom (1996 - 2000) (NNP)

==== City of Cape Town Municipality (Central Substructure) ====
- Nomaindia Mfeketo (1998–2000) (ANC)
- Theresa Solomon (1996–1998) (ANC)

==== City of Tygerberg Municipality (Tygerberg Substructure) ====
- Clifford Sitonga (1999–2000) (ANC)
- Lukas Olivier (1996–1999) (NNP)

==== South Peninsula Municipality (Southern Substructure) ====
- John Oswald "OJ" Jacobs (1996–2000) (NNP)

==== Helderberg Municipality (Helderberg Substructure) ====
- James Matthews (1996–2000) (NNP)

==== Oostenberg Municipality (Eastern Substructure) ====
- Danny De La Cruz (1996–2000) (NNP)

==== Blaauwberg Municipality (Northern Substructure) ====
- Desmond Stoffberg (1999–2000) (NNP)
- Heather Maneveld (1997–1999) (NNP)
- Algene Ross (1996–1997) (NNP)

=== City of Cape Town Transitional Council (February 1995–June 1996) ===
- Rev William Bantom (1995–1996) (NP)

=== Cape Colony (1840–1910) ===
Name	Term of office		Annotation
Michiel van Breda	1840	1844	First Chairman of the Cape Town Municipality.
J.J.L. Smuts	1844	1848	
Hercules Jarvis	1848	1860	
Dirk Gysbert van Breda	1860	1860	First Term
Gilles J. de Korte	1860	1862	First Term
W. Herman	1862	1863	
Thomas Watson	1863	1863	
Joseph Barry	1863	1865	
Dirk Gysbert van Breda	1865	1866	Second Term
Gilles J. De Korte	1866	1871	Second term. Title changed from "chairman" to "mayor" in 1867.
Philip Stigant	1871	1872	First Term
Gilles J. de Korte	1872	1874	Third term
Philip Stigant	1874	1875	Second term
P.U. Leibbrandt	1875	1876	
Charles Lewis	1876	1877	First term
John Philip	1877	1878	
Jan Christoffel Hofmeyr	1878	1879	
Petrus Kotzé	1879	1881	
William Fleming	1881	1883	
Charles Lewis	1883	1884	Second term
Philip Stigant	1884	1885	Third term
Thomas Inglesby	1885	1886	Former honorary Colonel of the Cape Field Regiment
John Woodhead	1886	1887	First term
Thomas O'Reilly	1887	1888	First Term
John Woodhead	1888	1889	Second Term
David Christiaan de Waal	1880	1890	
David Graaff	1890	1892	Later Minister of Public Works and Finance.
Johan Mocke	1892	1893	
John Woodhead	1893	1894	Third term
George Smart	1894	1895	
James Attwell	1895	1896	
John Woodhead	1896	1897	Fourth term
Herman Boalch	1897	1898	Died in office
Thomas Ball	1898	1900	
Thomas O'Reilly	1900	1901	Second term
William Thorne	1901	1904	
Hyman Liberman	1904	1907	
William Duncan Baxter	1907	1908	
Frank Smith	1908	1912	

=== Union of South Africa (1910–1961) ===
Name	Term of office		Annotation
Frank Smith	1908	1912	
Harry Hands	1912	1913	First term
John Parker	1913	1915	First Mayor of "Greater" Cape Town after surrounding municipalities had been incorporated into the city.
Harry Hands	1915	1918	Second term
William J. Thorne	1918	1920	
William Gardener	1920	1922	
Ryno J. Verster	1922	1925	
William Fish	1925	1927	
Andrew Reid	1927	1929	
Alfred Lewis	1929	1931	
Harry Stephan	1931	1933	
Louis Gradner	1933	1935	
James Low	1935	1937	
W.C. Foster	1937	1939	
Wilfred Brinton	1939	1941	
Walter James	1941	1943	
Ernest Nyman	1943	1945	
Abe Bloomberg	1945	1947	
Herbert Gearing	1947	1949	
Charles Booth	1949	1951	
Fritz Sonnenberg	1951	1953	
Arthur Keen	1953	1955	
Pieter Wolmarans	1955	1957	
John Orville Billingham	1957	1959	
Joyce Newton-Thompson	1959	1961	First female mayor

=== Republic of South Africa (1961–1995) ===
Name	Term of office	
Alfred Honikman	1961	1963
William Peters	1963	1965
Walter Gradner	1965	1967
Gerald Ferry	1967	1969
Jan Dommisse	1969	1971
Richard Friedlander	1971	1973
David Bloomberg	1973	1975
John Tyers	1975	1977
Edward Mauerberger	1977	1979
Louis Kreiner	1979	1981
M.J. Van Zyl	1981	1983
Sol Kreiner	1983	1985
Leon Markovitz	1985	1987
Peter Muller	1987	1989
Gordon Oliver	1989	1991
Frank Van der Velde	1991	1993
Clive Keegan	1993	1993
Patricia Sulcas Kreiner	1993	1995

== See also ==
- Cape Town City Council
- Timeline of Cape Town
