= Jan Christoffel Hofmeyr =

Stoffel Hofmeyr
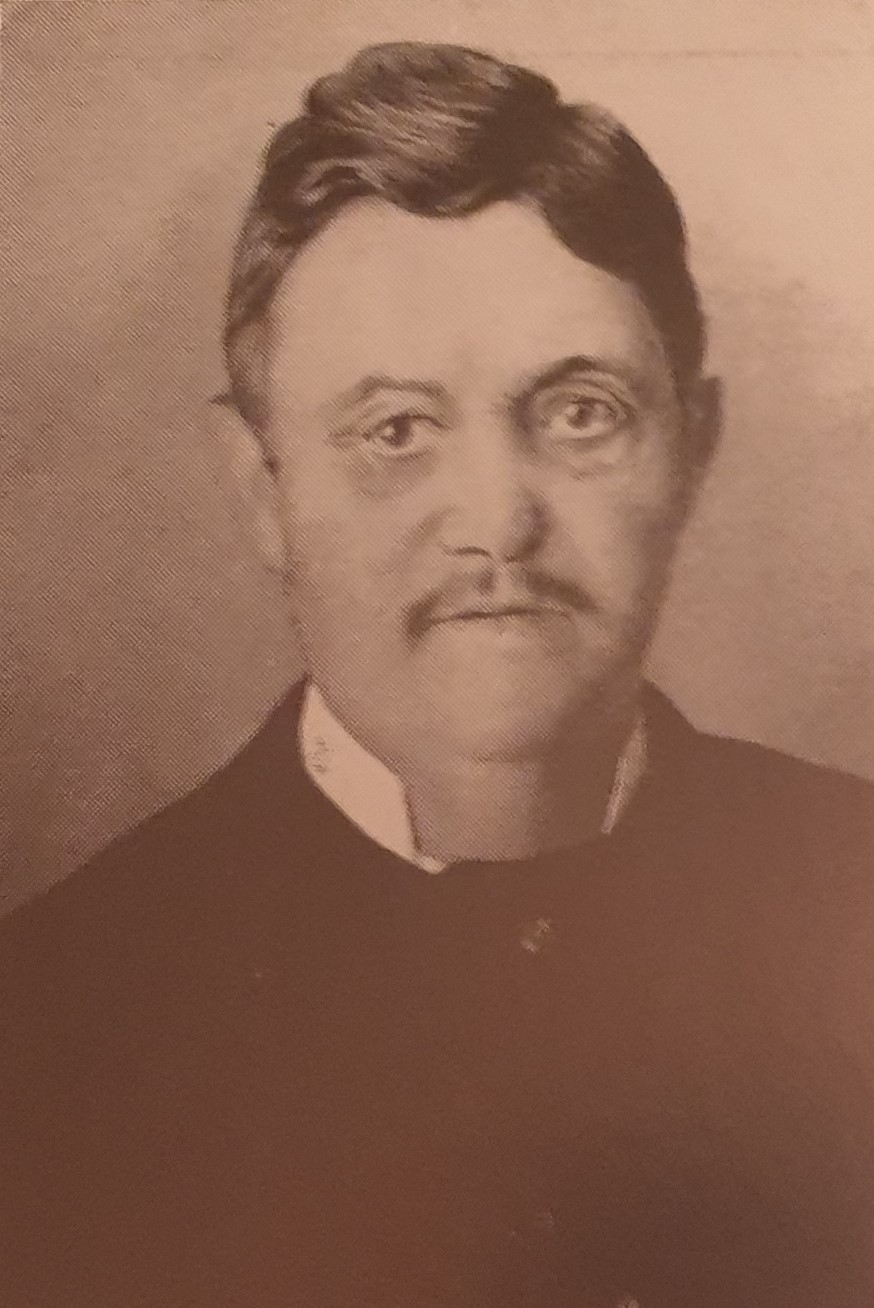

Mayor of Cape Town
- In office 1878–1879
- Preceded by: John Philip
- Succeeded by: Petrus Kotzé

Personal details
- Born: Jan Christoffel Hofmeyr; 8 May 1829 Cape Town, Cape Colony
- Died: 17 February 1898 (aged 68) Cape Town, Cape Colony
- Spouse(s): Catherina Geertruyda Truter; Helena Johanna Loubser
- Education: South African College

Jan Christoffel Hofmeyr (8 May 1829 – 17 February 1898) also known as Stoffel Hofmeyr was a notary, financier, benefactor and Mayor of Cape Town.

== Early life and career ==
Hofmeyr was the second son of Hendrik Johannes Hofmeyr and his wife Antonia Maria Berrangé. He attended the Tot Nut van het Algemeen school for 1835 to 1838 and the South African College from 1839 to 1841, where he was taught by Dr Antoine Changuion and developed a great love for the Dutch language and culture. As a young man he relocated to Burgersdorp as a legal agent and wool speculator. He was registered as a notary in 1853 and as a conveyancer in 1863.

== Public life ==
Hofmeyr returned to Cape Town in 1865 as a wealthy man and as he engaged in moneylending on a large scale. He was particularly interested in municipal affairs and became a member of the city council and was Mayor of Cape Town between 1878 and 1879. He served on the municipal financial committee for many years and was also a member of the divisional council and for many years an executive member of the Cape branch of the political party, the Afrikaner Bond.

Hofmeyr was as a great benefactor to the Groote Kerk in Cape Town. In 1877 he donated funds to the church to build offices, later known as the 'Hofmeyr Chambers', and shortly thereafter, he donated a second amount for the erection of a further double-storey office building adjacent to the church. He made a provision in his will to the effect that, six months after his death, a Hofmeyr Charity Fund was to be established for the Groote Kerk. He also made several further bequests in his will to the Church and stipulated, among other things, an amount for a Congregation Fund, the interest of which was to be used for needy children and he also bequeathed £20,000 (R7,941,000 in 2018) to the congregation on condition that at least two services be held in Dutch every Sunday.

Hofmeyr was married twice and had no children.
