= Farid Esack =

South African Muslim scholar, writer, and political activist (born 1955)

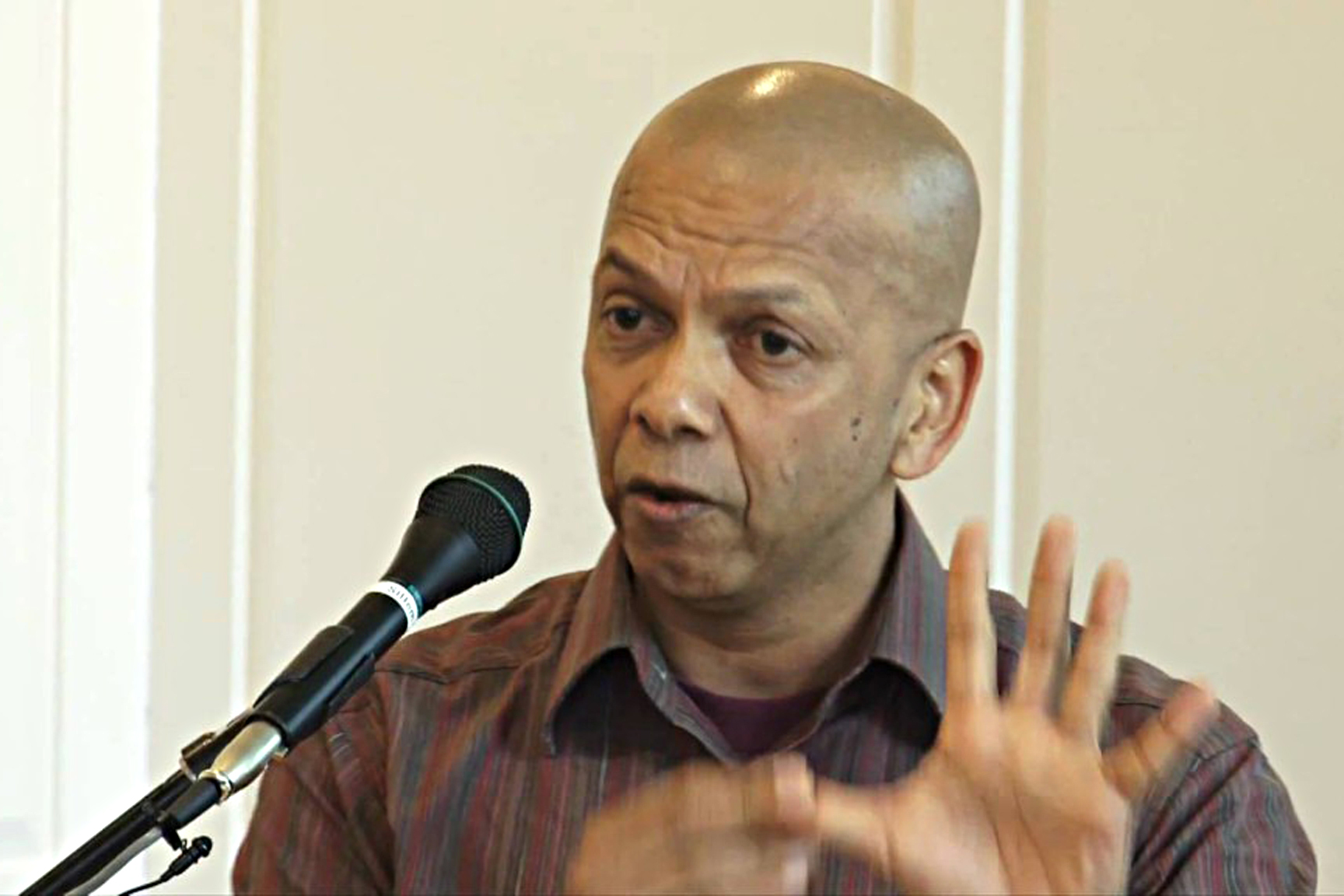
- Born: 8 March 1955 (age 71); Wynberg, Cape Town
- Citizenship: South Africa
- Education: University of Johannesburg
- Occupations: Scholar, writer, political activist

Farid Esack (born 1955 in Wynberg, Cape Town) is a South African Muslim scholar, writer, and political activist known for his opposition to apartheid, his appointment by Nelson Mandela as a gender equity commissioner, and his work for inter-religious dialogue.

== Early life ==
Esack was born into a poor Muslim family in the Wynberg suburb of Cape Town. While still a child, he and his mother were forcibly relocated as "non-Whites" under the provisions of the Group Areas Act. At age nine, Esack joined the revivalist Tablighi Jamaat movement, and by age 10 he was learning at a madrasah (religious school). At the age of 15 he received a scholarship to pursue Islamic studies in Pakistan. By the time he left for Pakistan in 1974 he had also become the local chairman of an anti-apartheid group, National Youth Action, and had been detained several times by security police.

Esack spent eight years as a student in at Jamia Uloom-ul-Islamia where he was a classmate of Maulana Abdul Aziz. where he was completing the traditional Dars-i-Nizami program of Islamic studies and becoming a mawlana or Muslim cleric. As he noted in the introduction to his book On Being a Muslim, some of his fellow students later joined the Taliban in Afghanistan. Having grown up with Christian neighbors, Esack became critical of discrimination against Christians and other religious minorities in Pakistan.

== Later life ==
Returning to South Africa in 1982, Esack became involved with activities of the Muslim Youth Movement of South Africa. He, along with three other members, left the organization in 1984, and helped form the Muslim anti-apartheid group Muslims Against Oppression, which later changed its name to Call of Islam, which became an important affiliate of the United Democratic Front. Esack addressed hundreds of protest meetings, formed ties with inter-faith opponents of apartheid, and became a leading figure within the World Conference of Religions for Peace. Esack founded Call of Islam with Adli Jacobs and his cousin, Ebrahim Rasool, who later became the Premier of the Western Cape and the South African ambassador to the United States. From 1984 to 1989, Esack was the National Coordinator of Call of Islam. This fulfilled his ambition of uniting the two halves of his personality – the religious with secular activism. He addressed rallies, conducted political funerals, and participated in inter-faith organisations opposed to apartheid. He became an important leader in the World Conference on Religion and Peace. An interesting image is of him marching, Qur’an in hand, under the banner of the CPSA flag.

In 1990 Esack left South Africa to continue his theological studies. He holds a PhD from the University of Birmingham, England, and pursued postdoctoral studies in Biblical hermeneutics at the Sankt Georgen Graduate School of Philosophy and Theology, Frankfurt, Germany.

Esack has also been involved with the organisation Positive Muslims, which is dedicated to helping HIV-positive Muslims in Africa. Positive Muslims programs include prevention, lobbying, and research activities, but the main focus of the organisation's work is counseling and support for people living with HIV/AIDS.

In May 2005 Farid Esack delivered the second Mandela Lecture sponsored by the Netherlands Institute for Southern Africa, Amsterdam.

In 2007-2008 Esack was the Prince Al-Waleed bin Talal Visiting Professor of Islamic Studies at Harvard Divinity School in Cambridge, Massachusetts.

Esack served as a Commissioner for Gender Equality in South African and has taught at the Universities of Western Cape, and Hamburg, the College of William & Mary and Union Theological Seminary (NY) and at Xavier University in Cincinnati. He is currently a professor of Islamic Studies at the University of Johannesburg, South Africa.

He is head of the South-African branch of BDS. He was responsible for the boycott of Ben Gurion University by the University of Johannesburg.

In 2013, Esack said that BDS distanced themselves from the singing of "shoot the Jew" in song during a protest at Wits University's Great Hall. "We unequivocally distance ourselves from the singing of this song and its sentiments. Also, to tarnish all Jews with the Zionist brush is racism regardless of who does it. Racism is racism and racism is abominable." Esack also bemoaned the advantage the incident had given the organisation's detractors. "It is unfortunate but not unexpected that supporters of Israel will focus on the singing of this song," he said. "The purpose and context of the protest were and remain the larger struggle against Israeli apartheid, Israel's illegal occupation and its violation of Palestinian rights."

In 2015 in the wake of 132 deaths caused by terror attacks in France, Esack lashed out at Western powers that had waged war on Muslim countries and that supported the invasion of Muslim countries. "I am not praying for Paris; I am not condemning anyone. Why the hell should I? I had nothing to do with it," "I am sickened by the perpetual expectations to condemn. I walk away from your shitty racist and Islamophobic expectations that whenever your chickens come home to roost then I must feign horror". "Stop supporting and funding terror outfits, get out of other people's lands and continents, stop outlawing peaceful resistance such as Boycott, Divestment and Sanctions (BDS) Movement, to occupations, abandon your cultural imperialism, destroy your arms industry that provides the weapons that kill hundreds of thousands of others every year". "The logic is quite simple: When you eat, it's stupid to expect that no shit will ever come out from your body. Yes, I feel sorry for the victims on whom the shit falls. But, bloody hell, own it; it's yours!"

In 2018, South African President Cyril Ramaphosa granted Esack the Order of Luthuli (Silver) for "his brilliant contribution to academic research and to the fight against race, gender, class and religious oppression. His body of work continues to enlighten generations of fledgling and established academics".

== Bibliography ==
- The Struggle. (1988) ISBN 0-620-12519-5
- But Musa went to Fir'aun! A Compilation of Questions and Answers about the Role of Muslims in the South African Struggle for Liberation. (South Africa, 1989) ISBN 0-620-14105-0
- Qur'an, Liberation and Pluralism: An Islamic Perspective of Interreligious Solidarity Against Oppression. (Oxford, 1997) ISBN 1-85168-121-3
- Islam and Politics (London, 1998) OCLC 67856723
- On Being a Muslim: Finding a Religious Path in the World Today. (Oxford, 1999) ISBN 1-85168-146-9
- The Qur'an: A Short Introduction. (Oxford, 2002) ISBN 1-85168-231-7
- The Qur'an: A User's Guide. (Oxford, 2005) ISBN 1-85168-354-2
- Whose Quran?: A Concise Guide to Progressive Islam (2014) ISBN 9781595584434
