= David Christiaan de Waal =

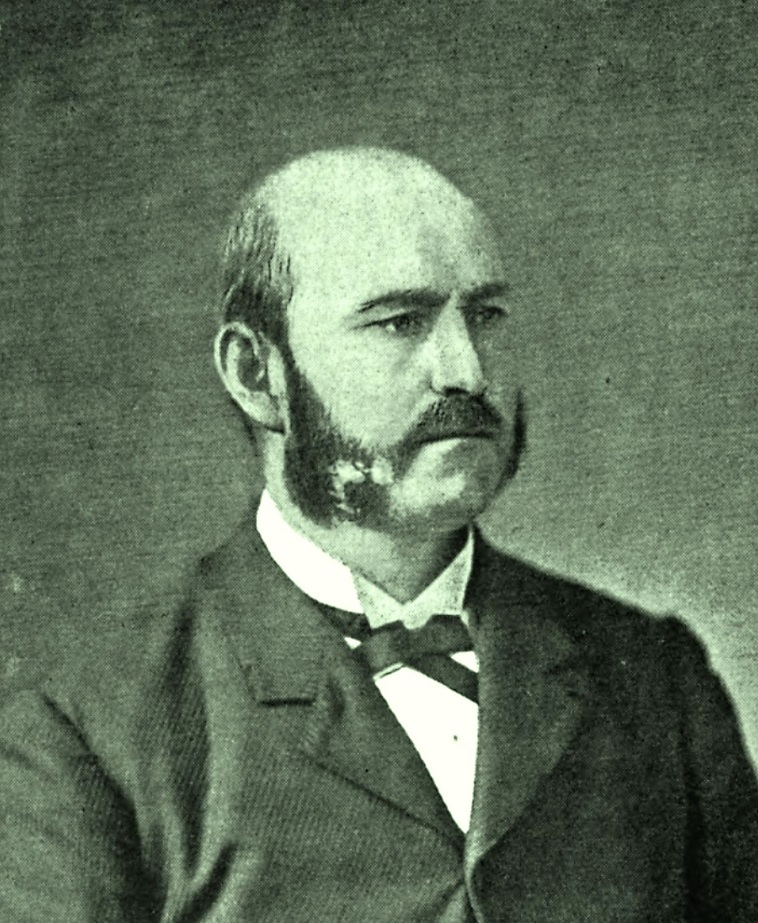

Mayor of Cape Town
- In office 1889–1890
- Preceded by: John Woodhead
- Succeeded by: Sir David Graaff

Personal details
- Born: David Christiaan de Waal; 25 November 1845 Kuils River, Cape Colony
- Died: 22 September 1909 (aged 63) Claremont, Cape Town, Cape Colony
- Spouse: Hester Sophia Hofmeyr
- Children: 7

David Christiaan de Waal (25 November 1845 – 22 September 1909) was a Cape politician, businessman and Mayor of Cape Town.

== Early life and career ==
De Waal was the twelfth child of Pieter de Waal, a farmer of Langverwacht, near Kuils River, and his wife Susanna Gertruida Louw. He only went to school for about four years, at farm and local schools in the district of Stellenbosch. Despite his relative lack of education, he was ambitious and confident, which helped him achieve success.

He initially farmed on the farm, Bakkerskloof, in Stellenbosch and from 1876 on Bellevue, a small fruit and wine farm at the upper end of Kloof Street in Cape Town. In 1878, together with H. de Vos de Kock, he established a hardware business in Cape Town and in 1895 the firm's name was changed to De Kock and Co, then already one of the largest such businesses in the Cape Colony.

== Public life ==
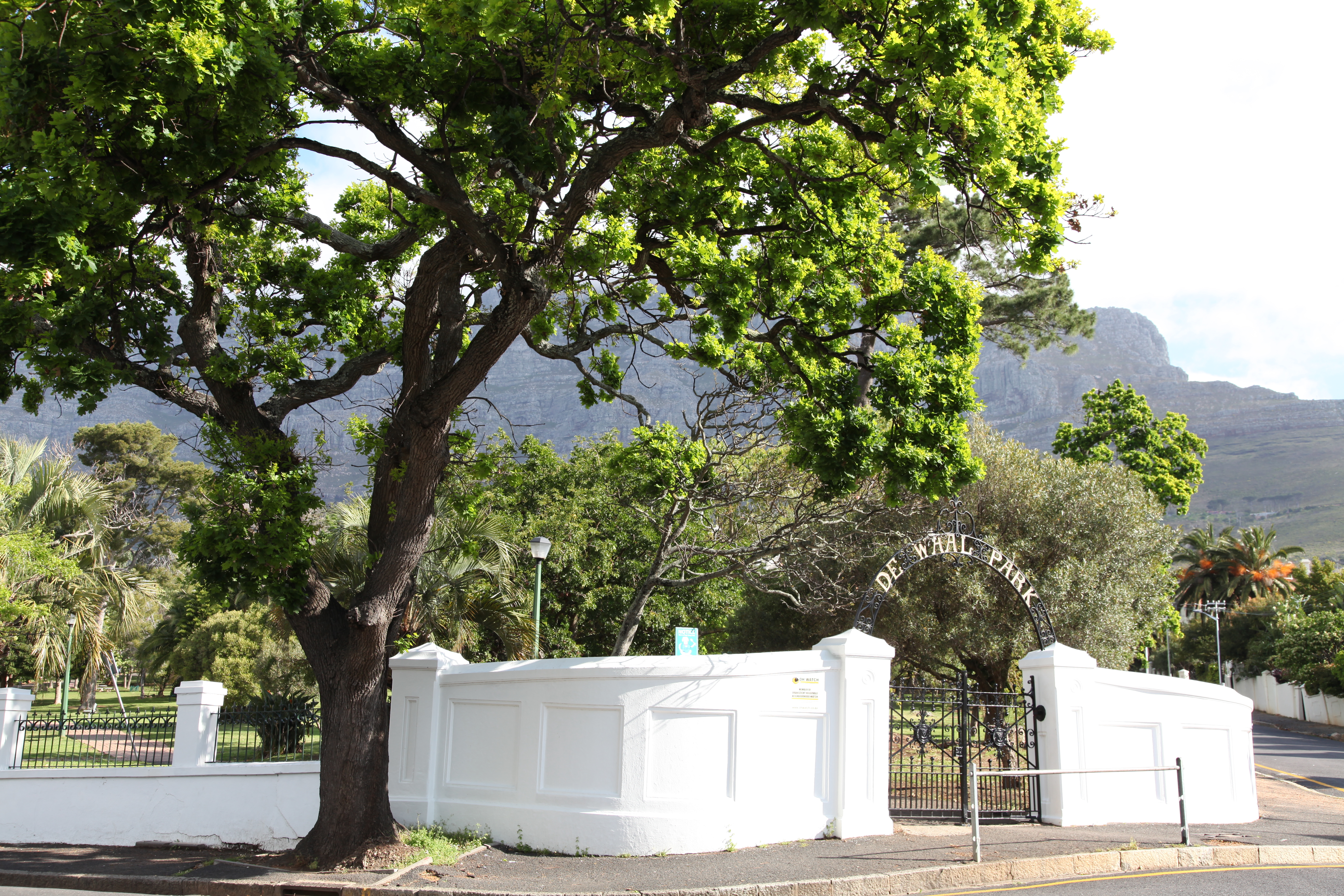
De Waal Park

From 1884 to 1903 he represented the constituency of Piketberg in the Cape Legislative Assembly and played an important part in securing a railway-line to Piketberg. He was also a member of the Cape Town City Council from 1877 to 1895 and mayor from 1889 to 1890. During his tenure as mayor, he focused on beautifying the city, specifically with the planting of a large number of oak and blue gum trees. In recognition of this, the city council, in 1895, named the area next to the Molteno Reservoir, which was laid out and planted, De Waal Park.

During the 1880s, De Waal travelled extensively, visiting Western Europe, the Middle East and North America. His travels provided De Waal with material for his writing and he wrote several articles that appeared in Dutch-language publications at the Cape.

== Personal life ==
De Waal married Hester Sophia Hofmeyr, the sister of Jan Hendrik Hofmeyr, of Welgemeend, Cape Town in 1869. There were four sons and three daughters born of the marriage. Two of the sons became prominent member of the community, the elder, Jan Hendrik Hofmeyr de Waal, became speaker of the Union parliament, and the other, Pieter de Waal, a clergyman of the Dutch Reformed Church.

In 1903, he retired from politics due to ill health, after which his health gradually deteriorated and he became, after a number of strokes, an invalid during his last years of life. He died on 22 September 1909 at his home 'Rozenberg' in Claremont, where he had been living from 1903.
