= List of heritage sites in Caledon =

This is a list of the heritage sites in Caledon, situated in the Overberg District Municipality (Western Cape), as recognized by the South African Heritage Resources Agency.

SAHRA identifier	Site name	Description	Town	District	NHRA status	Coordinates	Image
9/2/015/0001	Caledon Hot Springs, Caledon		Caledon	Caledon		34°13′32″S 19°26′14″E	Upload Photo
9/2/015/0002	GENADENDAL, CALEDON DISTRICT, GENERAL		Genadendal	Caledon			Upload Photo
9/2/015/0003	CALEDON MUNICIPAL AREA, GENERAL		Caledon	Caledon			Upload Photo
9/2/015/0004	7 Donkin Street, Caledon	Double storey house with a splay corner and stepped parapets. Cornice with round and rctangular vents below 6 × 6 sashes and 2 × 2 door with geometric fanlight on the corner. Very fine plasterwork, including quoins and keystones over openings. Type of site: House; Current use: House.	Caledon	Caledon	Provincial Heritage Site	34°13′59″S 19°25′39″E	Double storey house with a splay corner and stepped parapets. Cornice with round and rctangular vents below 6 × 6 sashes and 2 × 2 door with geometric fanlight on the corner. Very fine plasterwork, including quoins and keystones over openings. Type of site: House Current use: House.
9/2/015/0005	24 Mill Street, Caledon	House with hipped roof, with central covered gable and two projecting gables with bay windows under their own saddle roofs. The house has been renovated at time of survey. Gables all have fine fretted barge boards with finials and round vents. Type of site: House; Current use: House.	Caledon	Caledon	Provincial Heritage Site	34°13′53″S 19°25′52″E	Upload Photo
9/2/015/0006	Dagbreek Museum/Restaurant, 13 Graaff Street, Villiersdorp	Type of site: House Previous use: Residential. Current use: Restaurant / Museum.	Villiersdorp	Caledon	Provincial Heritage Site	33°59′21″S 19°17′23″E	Upload Photo
9/2/015/0007	De Villiers Graaff High School, Graaff Street, Villiersdorp, Caledon		Villiersdorp	Caledon	Pending Declaration	33°59′08″S 19°17′30″E	Upload Photo
9/2/015/0008	D R Vatem Hall, Van Riebeeck Street, Villiersdorp, Caledon		Villiersdorp	Caledon	Pending Register		Upload Photo
9/2/015/0009	Combrincks Gift, D R Church Parsonage, Main Street, Villiersdorp,		Villiersdorp	Caledon	Pending Register		Upload Photo
9/2/015/0010	Genadendal Mission Complex, Genadendal	The Genadendal Moravian Mission Station, which was founded by the missionary George Schmidt in 1737, is the oldest mission village in the Republic. The large number of historic buildings within the historic core date from the eighteenth and nineteenth centuries. Type of site: Mission Station; Current use: Mission station.	Genadendal	Caledon	Provincial Heritage Site	34°02′01″S 19°33′27″E	The Genadendal Moravian Mission Station, which was founded by the missionary George Schmidt in 1737, is the oldest mission village in the Republic. The large number of historic buildings within the historic core date from the eighteenth and nineteenth centuries. Type of site: Mission Station Current use: Mission station. Media related to Genadendal Mission Complex at Wikimedia Commons
9/2/015/0010-015	Bell tower, Mission Complex, Genadendal	Genadendal, one of the most picturesque villages in the Overberg, lies in this mountain valley with its spectacular scenery. The centre of the village is the mission station with its complex of buildings of the greatest historical and cultural interest. Type of site: Bell Tower	Genadendal	Caledon	Provincial Heritage Site	34°02′01″S 19°33′27″E	Genadendal, one of the most picturesque villages in the Overberg, lies in this mountain valley with its spectacular scenery. The centre of the village is the mission station with its complex of buildings of the greatest historical and cultural interest. Type of site: Bell Tower
9/2/015/0010/001	Contents of Mission Museum, Genadendal		Genadendal	Caledon	Heritage Object		
9/2/015/0010/002	Hallbeck House, Mission Complex, Genadendal	Type of site: House	Genadendal	Caledon	Provincial Heritage Site	34°02′01″S 19°33′28″E	Type of site: House
9/2/015/0010/003	Kuhnel House, Mission Complex, Genadendal	Type of site: House	Genadendal	Caledon	Provincial Heritage Site	34°02′04″S 19°33′27″E	Type of site: House
9/2/015/0010/1	Contents of Mission Museum, Genadendal, Caledon District		Genadendal	Caledon	Cultural Treasure	34°02′59″S 19°36′26″E	Upload Photo
9/2/015/0010/4	Watermill, Mission Complex, Genadendal, Caledon District		Genadendal	Caledon	National Monument	34°02′59″S 19°36′26″E	Upload Photo
9/2/015/0011	Old bridge over Rivier Sonderend, Genadendal	Built in 1819-1820 by the Moravian missionary J D Beinbach and members of the congregation. Two pillars were added in 1823. The road to the Moravian Mission Station, Genadendal, branches northwards from the national road a few kilometres west of Caledon. Type of site: Bridge; Current use: Bridge.	Genadendal	Caledon	Provincial Heritage Site	34°03′53″S 19°33′23″E	Built in 1819-1820 by the Moravian missionary J D Beinbach and members of the congregation. Two pillars were added in 1823. The road to the Moravian Mission Station, Genadendal, branches northwards from the national road a few kilometres west of Caledon. Type of site: Bridge Current use: Bridge.
9/2/015/0012	Court Building, Muller Street, Villiersdorp		Villiersdorp	Caledon	Pending Declaration		Upload Photo
9/2/015/0013	cnr Worcester & Caledon Street, Grabouw		Grabouw	Caledon			Upload Photo
9/2/015/0014	Webb House, Palmiet river Camping site, Kleinmond		Kleinmond	Caledon	Pending Declaration		Upload Photo
9/2/015/0015	W A J Pretorius dwelling, 28 Main Street, Villiersdorp		Villiersdorp	Caledon	Pending Declaration	33°59′29″S 19°17′27″E	Upload Photo
9/2/015/0016	Pretorius Family Cemetery, Farm Zeekoekraal, Villiersdorp		Villiersdorp	Caledon			Upload Photo
9/2/015/0017	Venster Rock, Victoria Park, Caledon		Caledon	Caledon	National Monument		Upload Photo
9/2/015/0018	Bath River Bridge, Mill Street, Caledon	Type of site: Bridge. Current use: Bridge.	Caledon	Caledon	Provincial Heritage Site	34°13′50″S 19°26′13″E	Type of site: Bridge. Current use: Bridge.
9/2/015/0019	11 Berg Street, Villiersdorp		Villiersdorp	Caledon		33°59′19″S 19°17′20″E	Upload Photo
9/2/015/0020	Mill Street Conservation Area, Caledon		Caledon	Caledon	Pending Desig.		Upload Photo
9/2/015/0021	Van Doorn's House, 13 Station Road, Caledon		Caledon	Caledon	Pending Declaration		Upload Photo
9/2/015/0022	GREYTON MUNICIPAL AREA, CALEDON DISTRICT, GENERAL		Greyton	Caledon			Upload Photo
9/2/015/0023	20 Mill Street, Caledon		Caledon	Caledon	Pending Declaration		Upload Photo
9/2/015/0024	Hassner's Pyramid Tomb, Town Commonage, Caledon		Caledon	Caledon	Pending Cons Area		Upload Photo
9/2/015/0025	3 Caledon Street, Villiersdorp		Villiersdorp	Caledon		33°59′40″S 19°17′43″E	Upload Photo
9/2/015/0026	VILLIERSDORP MUNICIPAL AREA, CALEDON DISTRICT, GENERAL		Villiersdorp	Caledon			Upload Photo
9/2/015/0027	The Post House, Main Road, Greyton	The Post House is one of the earliest buildings in Greyton, being constructed in 1860. The local Post Office was housed in a part of the building. It now serves as a country hotel. It is a fine example of modest village architecture.	Greyton	Caledon	Provincial Heritage Site	34°03′27″S 19°36′56″E	The Post House is one of the earliest buildings in Greyton, being constructed in 1860. The local Post Office was housed in a part of the building. It now serves as a country hotel. It is a fine example of modest village architecture.
9/2/015/0028	Zeekoekraal, Villiersdorp, Caledon District		Villiersdorp	Caledon			Upload Photo
9/2/015/0029	Mill Restaurant & Art Gallery, 25 Mill Street, Caledon		Caledon	Caledon			Upload Photo
9/2/015/0030	GRABOUW MUNICIPAL AREA, GENERAL		Grabouw	Caledon			Upload Photo
9/2/015/0031	Homestead, Bo-Radyn, Caledon District	The historic Cape Dutch farmhouse, Bo-Radyn, was built in 1777. The fine pilaster front gable, with its triangular pediment, was however erected about 1836, probably by the owner, Daniel du Toit Sr. Type of site: House; Current use: Dwelling.		Caledon	Provincial Heritage Site	34°13′53″S 19°25′31″E	Upload Photo
9/2/015/0032	Holy Trinity Church, Prince Alfred Street, Caledon	This church was designed by Sophie Gray. She was not an architect but the clean lines and simplicity of design make it a most attractive. building. She maintained that churches were built for worship and not for beauty. Type of site: Church; Current use: Church : Anglican. This stonework church with stained glass windows was designed by Sophie Gray. The foundation stone was laid in 1850 and the church was consecrated in 1855 by Bishop Gray.	Caledon	Caledon	Provincial Heritage Site	34°13′54″S 19°25′39″E	This church was designed by Sophie Gray. She was not an architect but the clean lines and simplicity of design make it a most attractive. building. She maintained that churches were built for worship and not for beauty. Type of site: Church Current use: Church : Anglican. This stonework church with stained glass windows was designed by Sophie Gray. The foundation stone was laid in 1850 and the church was consecrated in 1855 by Bishop Gray.
9/2/015/0033	14 Main Road, Greyton	This dwelling-house has an interesting combination of vernacular and Georgian characteristics and dates from the mid-nineteenth century. The single-storey rear section probably pre-dates the original grant of land made in 1839. Previous use: residential. Current use: residential and commercial.	Greyton	Caledon	Provincial Heritage Site	34°03′06″S 19°36′21″E	This dwelling-house has an interesting combination of vernacular and Georgian characteristics and dates from the mid-nineteenth century. The single-storey rear section probably pre-dates the original grant of land made in 1839. Previous use: residential. Current use: residential and commercial.
9/2/015/0034	Greyton Lodge, 46 Main Road, Greyton, Caledon District		Greyton	Caledon		34°02′51″S 19°36′40″E	Upload Photo
9/2/015/0035	Rock Martin Shelter, Kanonberg, Caledon District		Kanonberg	Caledon			Upload Photo
9/2/015/0036	Blaas 'n Bietjie, Betty's Bay	This property was bought in 1961 by Dr H.F. Verwoerd, the former Prime Minister. The house was planned by Dr Verwoerd himself in the modern style. The garage and a milkwood thicket are situated on the same erf. Type of site: House; Current use: Dwelling.	Betty's Bay	Caledon	Provincial Heritage Site	34°21′10″S 18°55′37″E	Upload Photo
9/2/015/0037	KLEINMOND MUNICIPAL AREA, CALEDON DISTRICT, GENERAL		Kleinmond	Caledon			Upload Photo
9/2/015/0038	Town Hall, Plein Street, Caledon	Fine double storey building with tiled roof and facades in Church Street and Main Road. The Town Hall, facing Church Street, has an ornate ventilating turret in the centre of the roof, and two projecting gables. The gables have corner quoins. Type of site: Town Hall; Current use: Town Hall.	Caledon	Caledon	Provincial Heritage Site	34°13′55″S 19°25′44″E	Fine double storey building with tiled roof and facades in Church Street and Main Road. The Town Hall, facing Church Street, has an ornate ventilating turret in the centre of the roof, and two projecting gables. The gables have corner quoins. Type of site: Town Hall Current use: Town Hall.
9/2/015/0039	1 Caledon Street, Villiersdorp, Caledon District		Caledon	Caledon		33°59′40″S 19°17′42″E	Upload Photo
9/2/015/0040	CALEDON MAGISTERIAL DISTRICT, GENERAL		Caledon	Caledon			Upload Photo
9/2/015/0041	Wolwekloof, Caledon District		Caledon	Caledon	Pending Declaration		Upload Photo
9/2/015/0042	Radyn, Caledon District		Caledon	Caledon	Pending Declaration		Upload Photo
9/2/015/0043	BETTY'S BAY MUNICIPAL AREA, CALEDON DISTRICT, GENERAL		Betty's Bay	Caledon			Upload Photo
9/2/015/0044	Caledon Museum, 11 constitution Street, Caledon		Caledon	Caledon		34°13′47″S 19°25′47″E	Upload Photo
9/2/015/0045	"Sterhuis", Ou Werf, Caledon District		Caledon	Caledon			Upload Photo
9/2/015/0046	Scandinavian Timber House, Elgin, Caledon District		Elgin	Caledon			Upload Photo
9/2/015/0047	RIVIERSONDEREND MUNICIPAL AREA, GENERAL		Riviersonderend	Caledon			Upload Photo
9/2/015/0048	Compagnes Drift, Bot River, Caledon District		Bot River	Caledon		34°13′36″S 19°12′22″E	Upload Photo
9/2/015/0049	The Oaks, Farm 145, Caledon District		Caledon	Caledon		34°05′43″S 19°41′43″E	Upload Photo
9/2/015/0050	MYDDLETON LOCAL AREA, GENERAL		Myddleton	Caledon			Upload Photo
9/2/015/0051	Stony Point, Betty’s Bay, Caledon District		Betty's Bay	Caledon		34°22′17″S 18°53′35″E	Upload Photo
9/2/015/0052	Drayton, Caledon District		Caledon	Caledon		34°13′33″S 19°31′57″E	Upload Photo
9/2/015/0053	Teslaarsdal, Caledon District		Caledon	Caledon			Upload Photo
9/2/015/0054	5 Max Harris Street, Grabouw		Grabouw	Caledon	Register	34°09′08″S 19°01′22″E	
