= Erepsia serrata =

Scientific classification
- Kingdom: Plantae
- Clade: Tracheophytes
- Clade: Angiosperms
- Clade: Eudicots
- Order: Caryophyllales
- Family: Aizoaceae
- Subfamily: Ruschioideae
- Tribe: Ruschieae
- Genus: Erepsia
- Species: E. serrata

Binomial name
- Erepsia serrata (L.) L.Bolus

Synonyms
- Circandra serrata (L.) N.E.Br.; Mesembryanthemum serratifolium Steud.; Mesembryanthemum serratum L. (1753) (basionym)

Genus of flowering plants

Erepsia serrata is a species of flowering plant belonging to the family Aizoaceae. It is a succulent subshrub native to the southwestern Cape Provinces of South Africa, where it ranges from Tulbagh to Villiersdorp.
