= De Waal Park =

Urban park in Oranjezicht, Cape Town

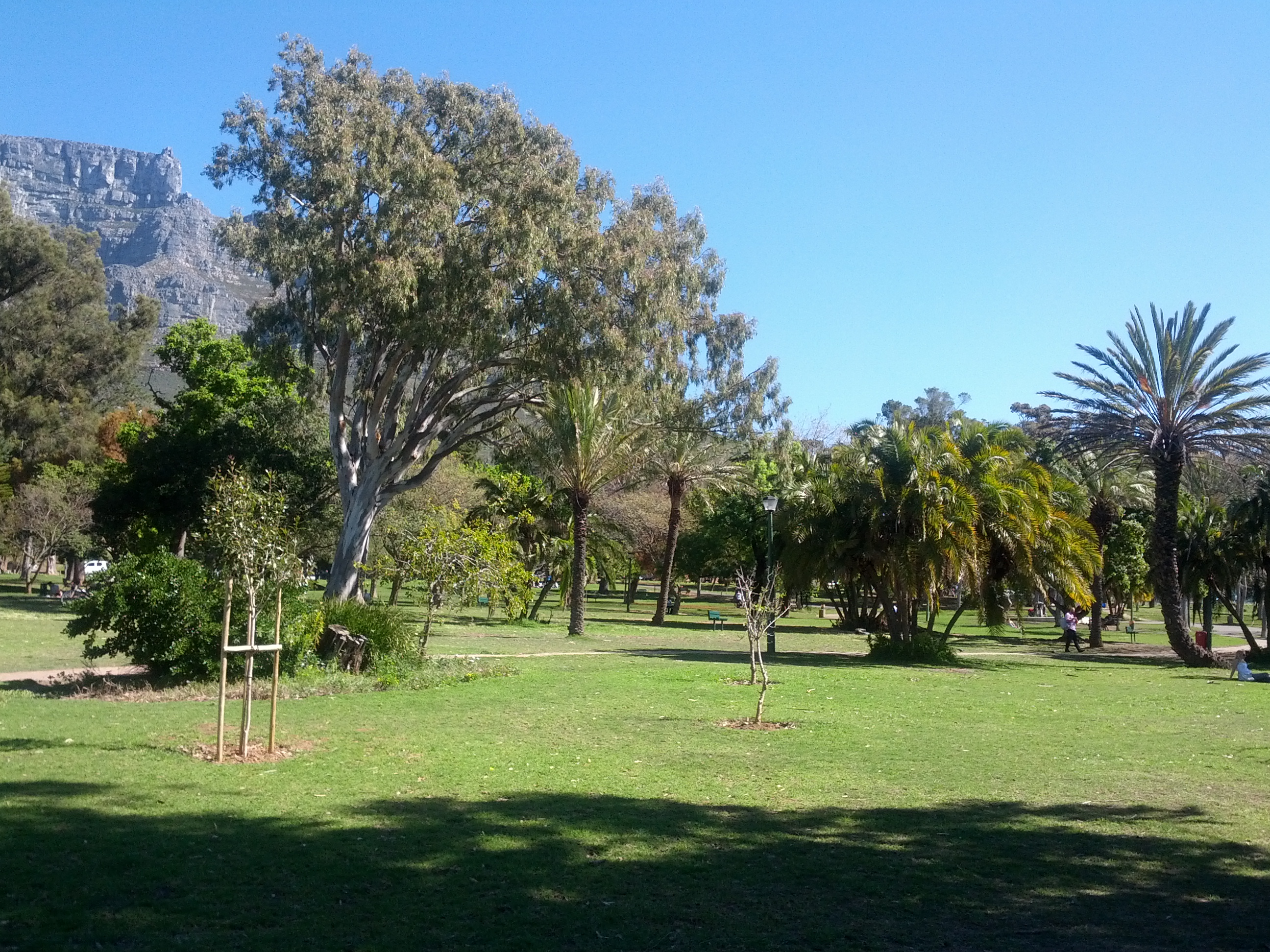

- Location within Cape Town
- Type: Urban park
- Location: Oranjezicht, Cape Town, South Africa
- Coordinates: 33°56′12″S 18°24′45″E
- Area: 7.267 hectares (17.96 acres)
- Created: 1895
- Operator: Friends of De Waal Park; City of Cape Town
- Status: Open all year

De Waal Park is a public park and heritage site in the Oranjezicht suburb of Cape Town. The park, which contains over 120 species of trees, is popular with dog walkers.

The park is roughly rectangular. Molteno Dam borders the park to the south, with the other three sides bordered by roads. There are four tennis courts belonging to the Gardens Tennis Club in the South West corner.

In summer, the park hosts free outdoor concerts on Sunday afternoons.

== History ==
De Waal Park was Cape Town's first and largest public park, after the Company's Gardens, when it was opened in 1895.

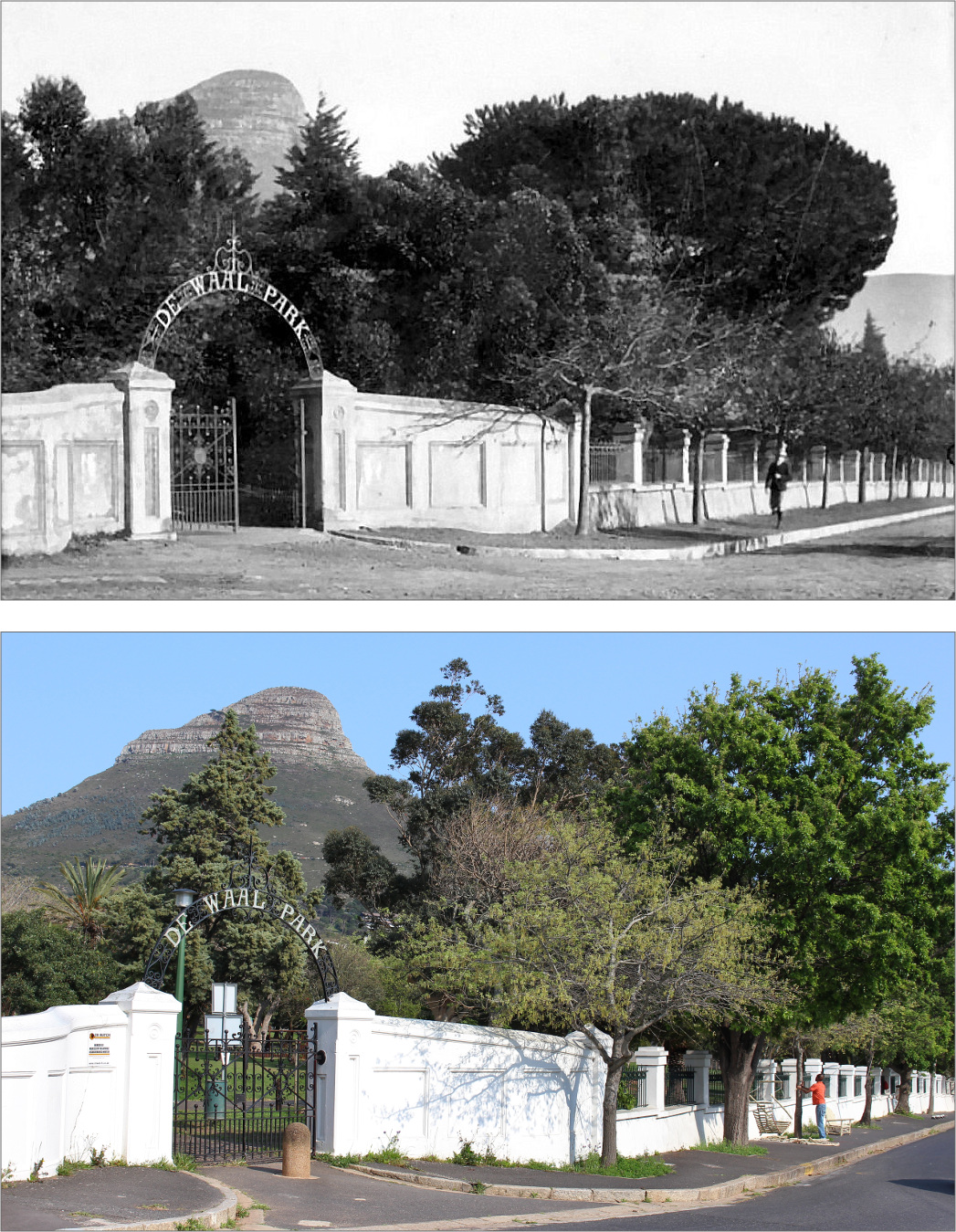
De Waal Park ca. 1900 vs 2015

In 1877 the City Council of Cape Town purchased land from the Van Breda family who owned the farm Oranjezigt. They divided the land into three parts, first building the two smaller reservoirs below Camp Street and then building the Molteno Reservoir below Belvedere Road which also provided the city with electricity. The land in between formed a natural park.

David Christiaan de Waal, who was the city councillor at the time and also a member of the Legislative Council of the Cape Colony, decided to develop the park. At his instigation thousands of trees were planted in Cape Town and especially in the park. As Mayor of Cape Town, 1889–1890, he developed the park further and it was opened to the public officially in 1895.

At one stage it was called Jubilee Park but it soon reverted to the name it bears today.

Two gates with brick piers and wrought-iron arches in Art Nouveau style at the lower corners and a wall along Camp Street were built in 1899 and the wall was extended up Upper Orange Street in 1900. Molteno Road was extended down to meet Camp Street at about this time and it was decided to fence off the park on that side by planting a hedge of Kei apple.

The bandstand was built in 1904/5 for the Cape Town Exhibition which was held in Green Point and moved to the park after the exhibition was over. It was used for public performances for some years.

The Victorian fountain in De Waal Park is a natural artesian well and feeds the Lower Reservoir No. 2 in Oranjezicht.

On 22 March 1968 the park was proclaimed a National Monument to be maintained in perpetuity as public gardens and it is now listed as a Provincial Heritage Site.

== Gallery ==
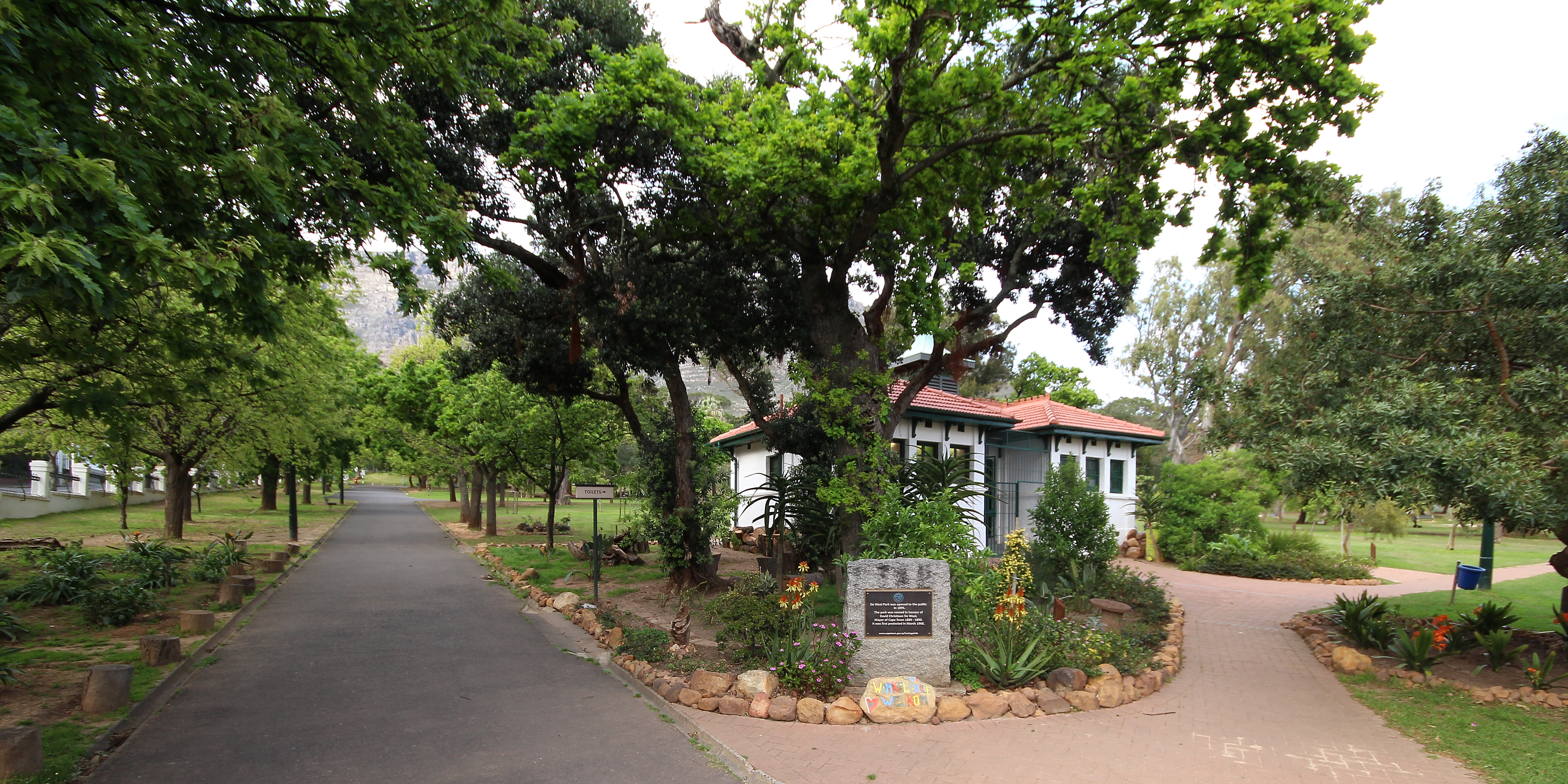
North East Corner

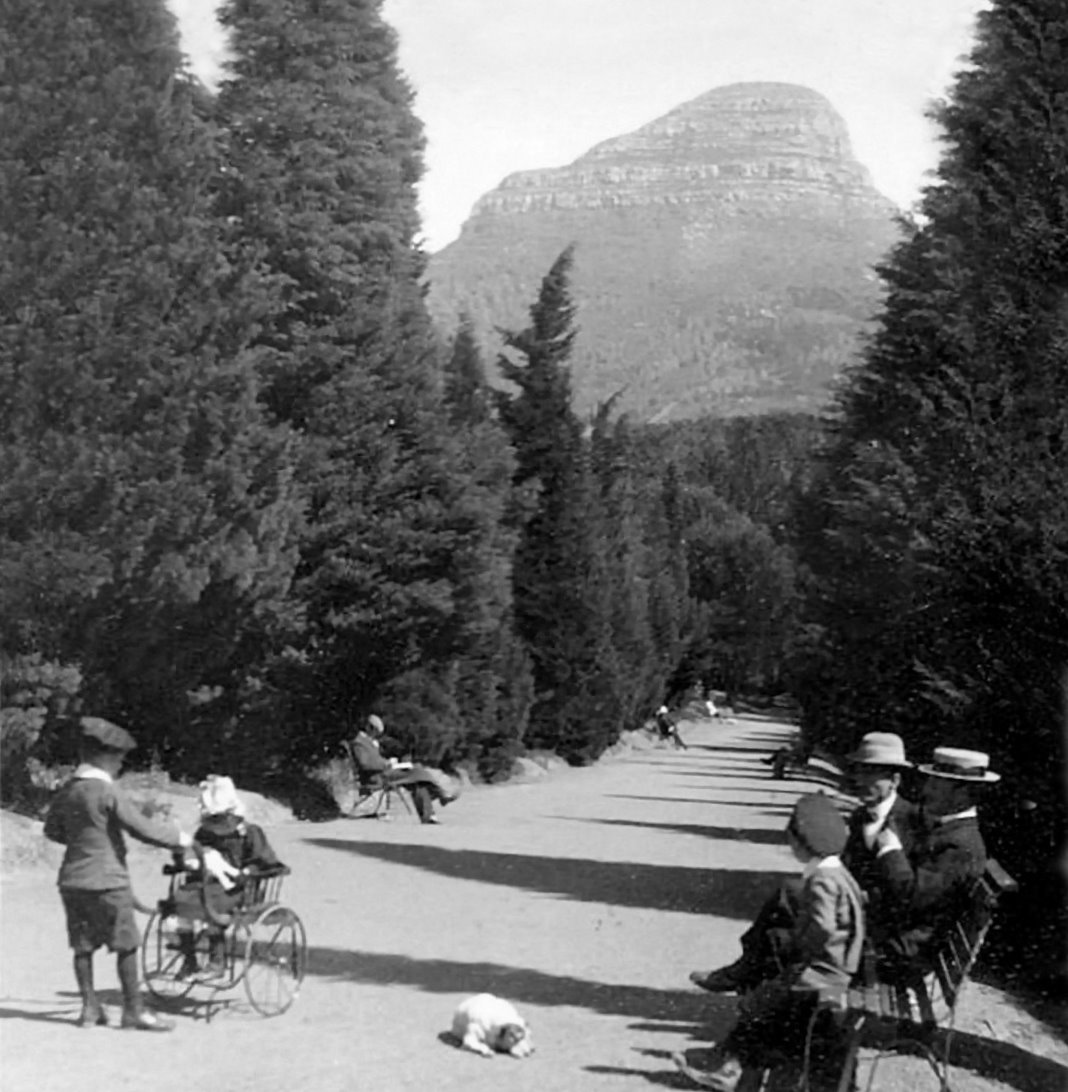
De Waal Park ca. 1898

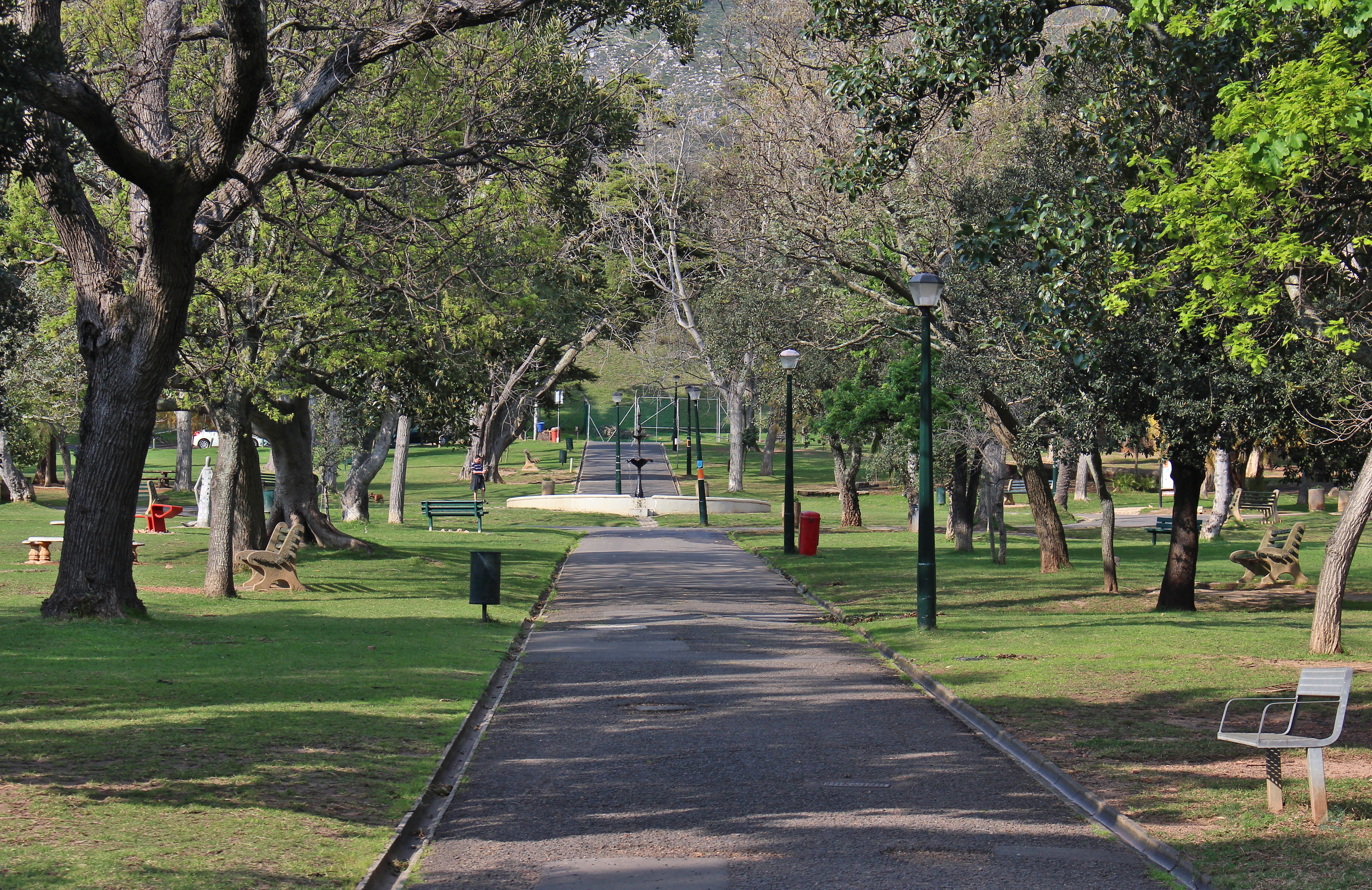
Center of the park 2015

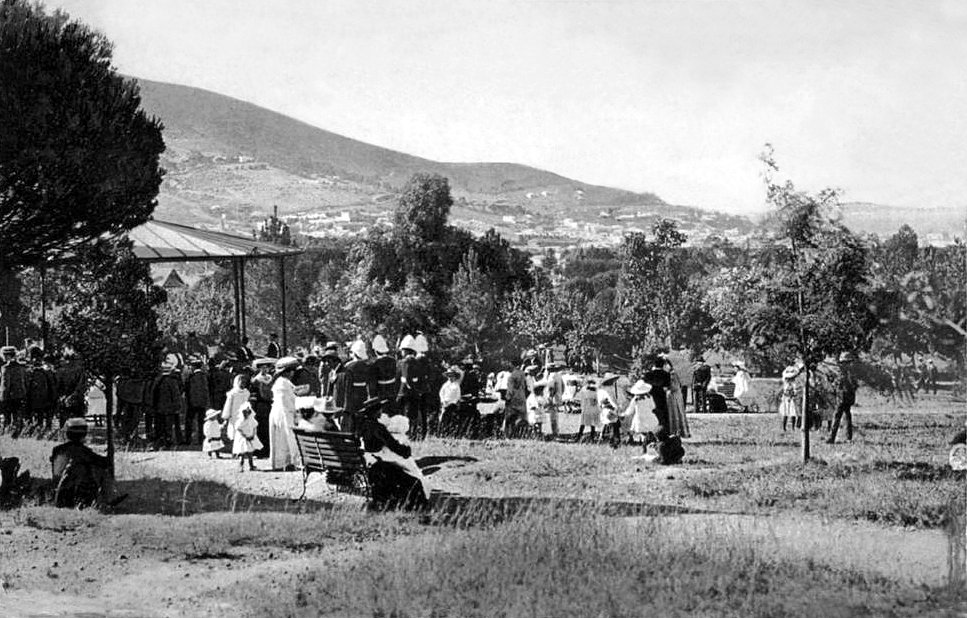
Bandstand and Signal Hill ca. 1905

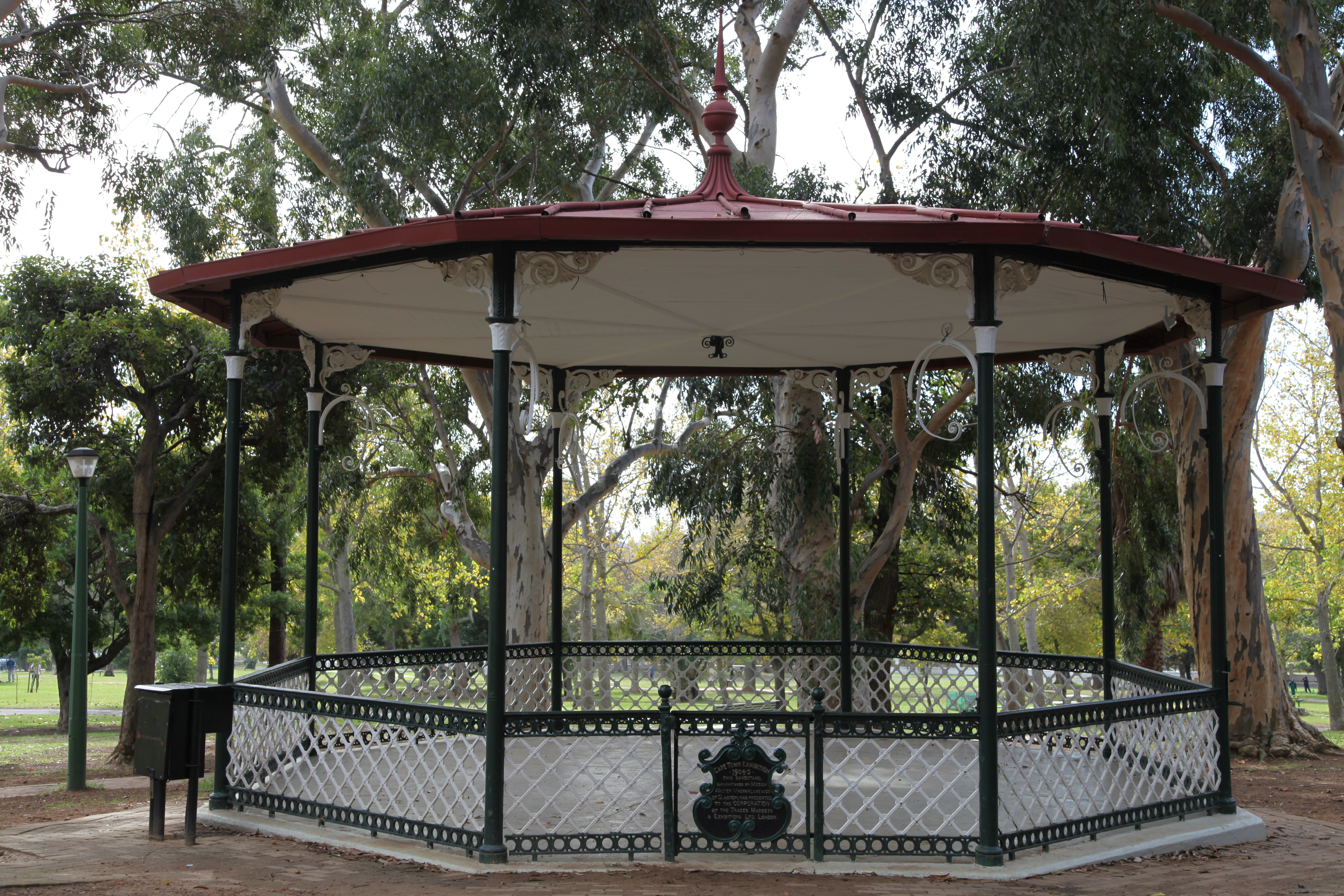
The Edwardian bandstand in 2012

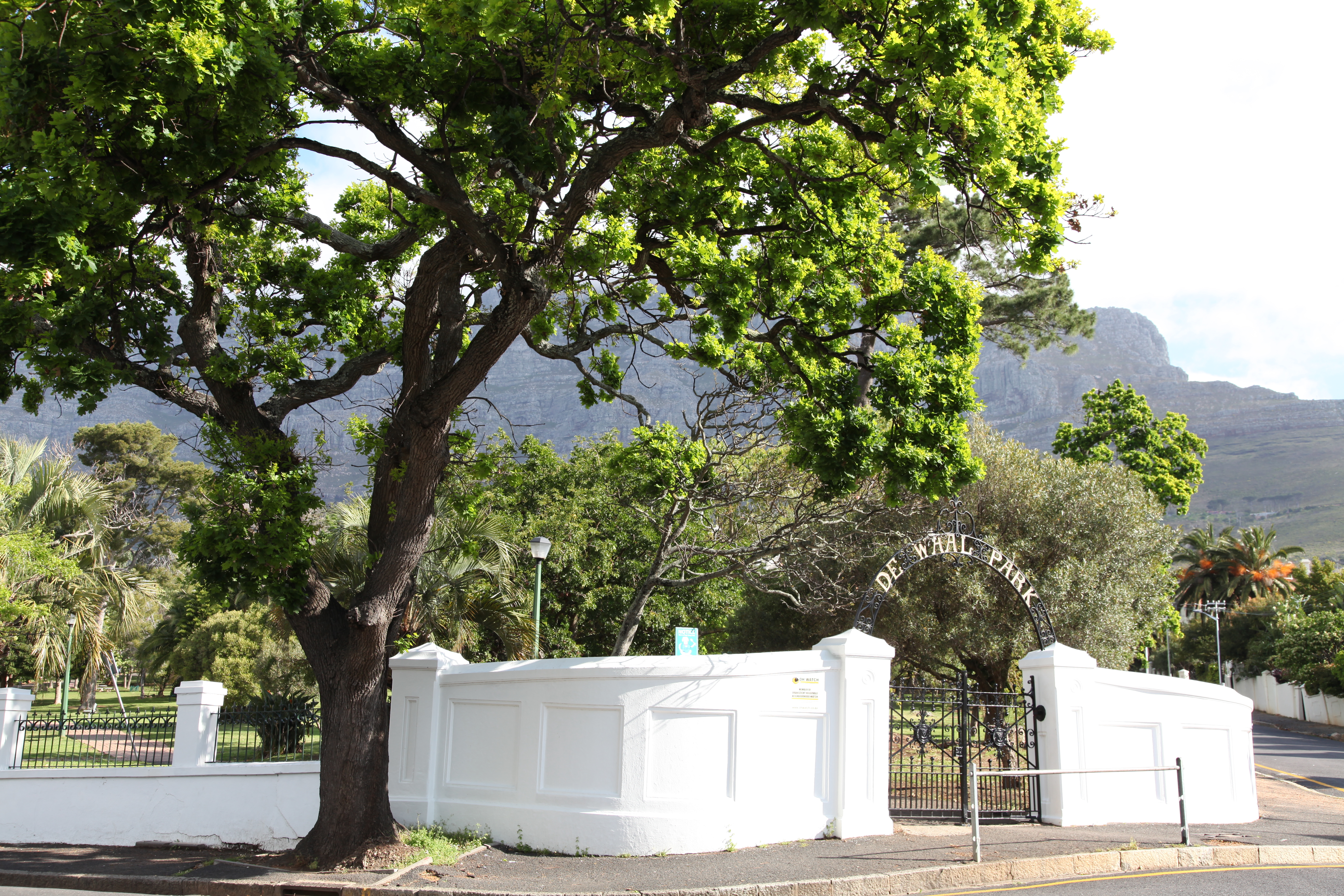
North West Gate
