= Imperial Cold Storage and Supply Company =

- Industry: Food Processing
- Founded: 1899 (1830)
- Defunct: 1998
- Fate: Bought out by Tiger Brands
- Headquarters: Cape Town, Cape Colony (1830-1910); Cape Town, Union of South Africa (1910-)
- Key people: David Pieter de Villiers Graaff, Co-Founder & Chairman; Jacobus Arnoldus Graaff Co-Founder
- Products: Meat, Dairy Products, Seafood
- Number of employees: 18,000 (1985)
- Subsidiaries: Over a hundred

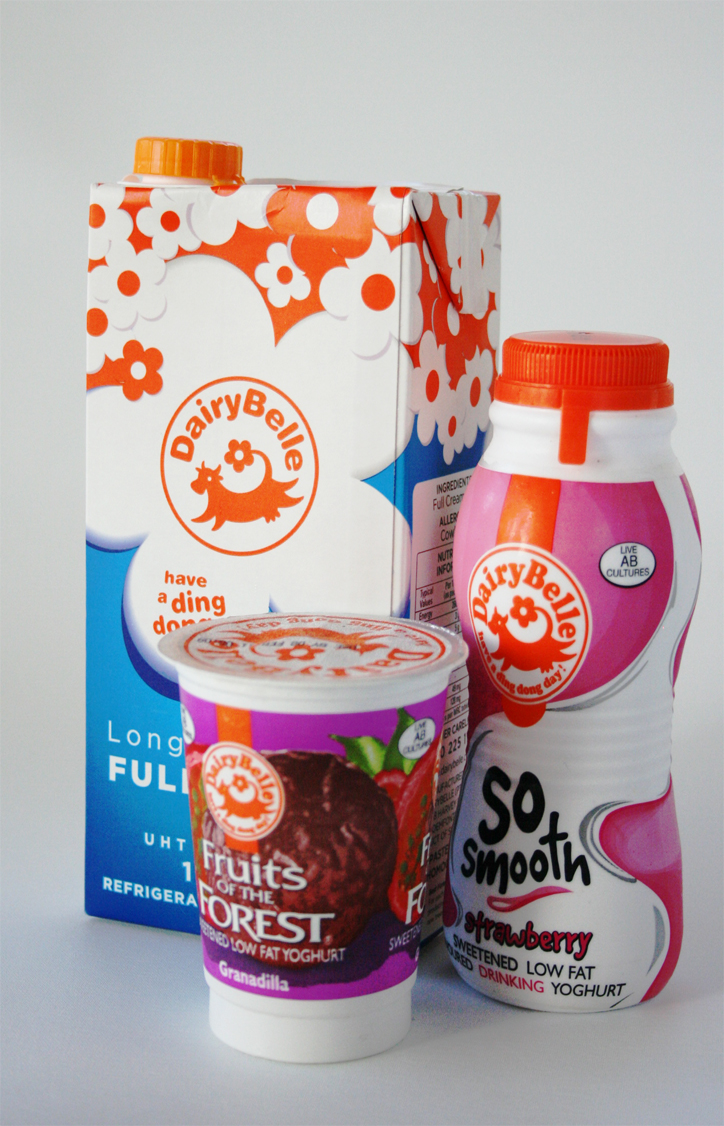
A selection of three popular Dairy Belle dairy products. A box of full cream long life milk, a bottle of strawberry drinking yogurt, and a carton of passion fruit yogurt. Dairy Belle was originally established by ICS in 1969 and is now produced by Tiger Brands.

Imperial Cold Storage and Supply Company (ICS) was one of the largest meat processing, storage, distribution and marketing companies in South Africa, dominating the South African packaged food sector for almost a hundred years. The company was formally registered and listed as ICS in 1899, originally it grew out of Combrinck & CO. which was founded in 1830 in Cape Town. Combrinck & CO. was then merged into ICS. ICS was one of the largest meat processing and distribution companies in the world. The company originally concentrated on supplying ships, but would go on to develop the first cold-storage enterprise in South Africa in conjunction with the Union and Castle shipping lines. Sir David Graaff, 1st Baronet was a founder, chairman and major shareholder.

== Rhodesian operation ==
In 1924, the then government of Southern Rhodesia, now Zimbabwe, granted a ten-year monopoly to the company. Enforced by act of government, it also guaranteed the company's operations in Rhodesia for the duration of its monopoly with an up to GB£15 000 per annum guaranteed against losses resulting from its operations. In return Imperial Cold Storage agreed to develop the country's chilled and frozen beef industry. In terms of the act's objective to establish a beef packing and processing industry in Rhodesia the government's partnership with Imperial Cold Storage was a success.

== Tiger Brands buyout ==
Due to the high costs of expansion in southern Africa along with a slump in the demand for meat following the Great Depression in 1934 the company was in serious financial trouble. More money was sought from investors to help shore up the companies finances. Anglo-American corporation was the largest investor and the total capital of the company increased to GB£2.2 million (equivalent to R790,000,000 in 2018). Anglo's share in the company would continue to grow as Imperial Cold Storage worked more and more with Tiger Oats, then a subsidiary of Anglo-American corporation.

In March 1982 Barlow bought a considerable share of Tiger Oats and a controlling share in Imperial Cold Storage. In October 1998 Tiger Brands (then known as Tiger Oats Limited) bought out Imperial Cold Storage and the company was folded into its portfolio of brands and companies.

== Other references ==
- Knowles, Lilian Charlotte Anne & Knowles, Charles Matthew. (1936) "The Economic Development of the British Overseas Empire, Volume 3". Routledge, USA & Canada, republished in 2005, pg 195
- Graaff, De Villiers. (1993) "Div Looks Back: The memoirs of Sir De Villiers Graaff". Human & Rousseau, Cape Town.
- Simons Brooke, Phillida. (2000) "Ice cold in Africa: The history of the Imperial Cold Storage & Supply Company Limited". Fernwood Press, Cape Town.
