= Oranjezicht =

Cape Town suburb, in Western Cape, South Africa

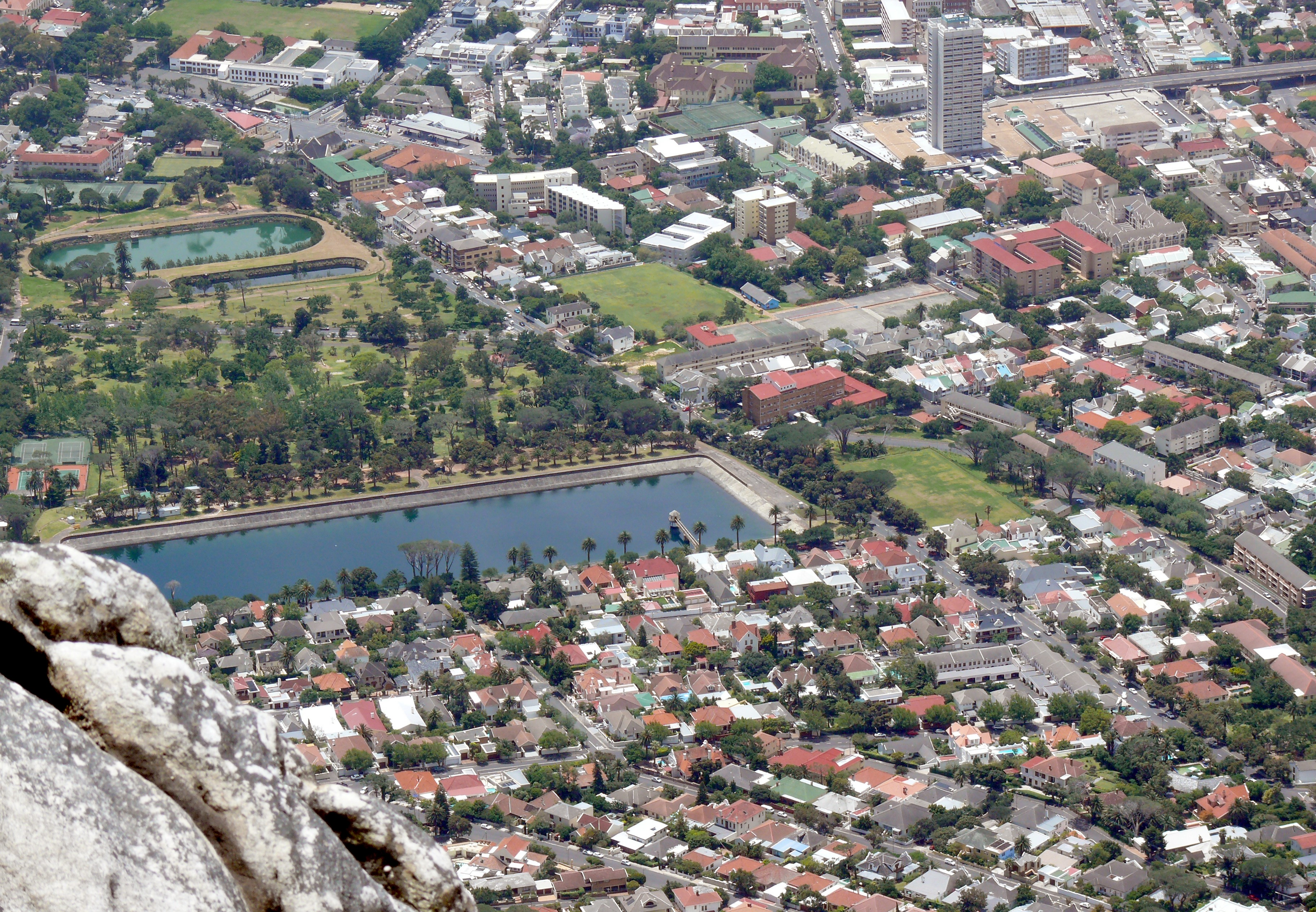
- Part of Oranjezicht from the summit of Table Mountain. Molteno Dam and De Waal Park centre left.
- Interactive map of Oranjezicht
- Country: South Africa
- Province: Western Cape
- Municipality: City of Cape Town
- Main Place: Cape Town

Government
  - Councillor: Vivienne Walker (DA)

Area
  - Total: 1.13 km^{2} (0.44 sq mi)

Population (2011)
  - Total: 3,580
  - Density: 3,170/km^{2} (8,210/sq mi)

Racial makeup (2011)
  - Black African: 13.3%
  - Coloured: 5.2%
  - Indian/Asian: 2.2%
  - White: 74.6%
  - Other: 4.7%

First languages (2011)
  - English: 65.6%
  - Afrikaans: 22.6%
  - Xhosa: 1.7%
  - Other: 10.2%
- Time zone: UTC+2 (SAST)
- Postal code (street): 8001

Oranjezicht (Dutch: orange view) is a suburb in the City Bowl area of Cape Town, South Africa. It was built on the site of the old Oranjezicht farm, which used to stretch at least as far as the Mount Nelson Hotel and supplied the Castle of Good Hope with fresh produce.

== History ==
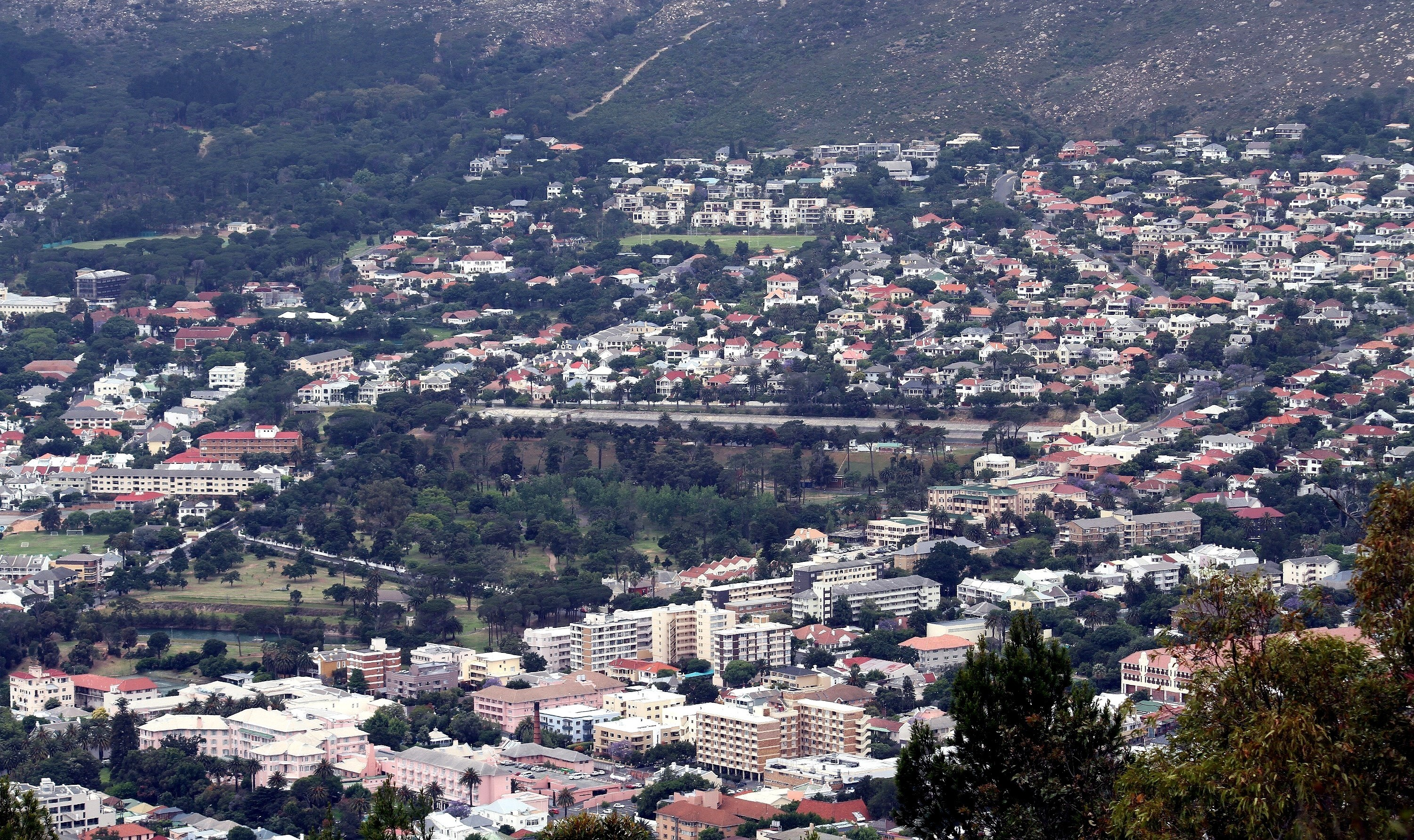
The suburb of Oranjezicht on the slopes of Table Mountain, in Cape Town; De Waal park in the centre.

In 1708, Nicolaus Laubscher (1651–1721), who had immigrated in the 1670s from the Swiss canton of Fribourg, bought a property on the slopes of Table Mountain that he called "Oranjezicht" because of the good view from there of the Oranje (Orange) bastion of the Castle. Subsequent to his death, the farm was evidently acquired by Pieter van Breda (1696–1759), who arrived at the Cape in 1719 from the Netherlands. "Oranjezicht" was a farm for the next two centuries. Some of the buildings of the farm as well as the old slave bell are still at the location where the farm once stood. The farmhouse was on the property directly to the east of what is now a public park and playground. It was torn down in the 1960s to make way for a bowling green, which was later replaced by the Oranjezicht City Farm, a non-profit community farm project celebrating local food, culture and community through urban farming in Cape Town, in 2013.

The Molteno Dam was built in 1877, to provide water for Cape Town by storing natural spring water from Table Mountain. At the time it was located on the mountain slopes above the infant city, but the city grew around it and it is now in the middle of the Oranjezicht suburbs. It is still in operation today. The Graaff Electric Lighting Works, commissioned in 1895, is located next to the Molteno Dam and was Cape Town's first municipal electrical power plant and the second power plant in South Africa.

== Places of interest ==
- St. Cyprian's School
- Booth Memorial Hospital
- De Waal Park
- Molteno Dam
