= Graaff Electric Lighting Works =

Decommissioned historical power plant in Cape Town, South Africa

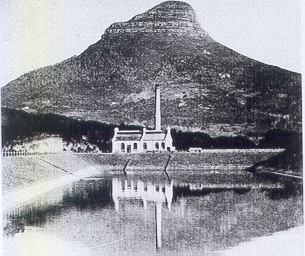
- A photo of Molteno Dam soon after construction, with Lions Head in the background. The white building behind the dam is the Graaff Electric Lighting Works, Cape Town's first power plant.
- Country: South Africa
- Location: Oranjezicht, Cape Town
- Coordinates: 33.9385°S 18.412°E
- Status: Decommissioned
- Commission date: 1895
- Decommission date: 1920
- Owner: City of Cape Town

Thermal power station
- Primary fuel: Hydro-electric
- Secondary fuel: Coal
- Turbine technology: Steam turbine, Hydropower
- Cooling source: Reservoir water

Power generation
- Units operational: 2
- Nameplate capacity: 300 kW

External links
- Commons: Related media on Commons

The Graaff Electric Lighting Works power station is a decommissioned Hydro-electric and steam power plant located in Cape Town, South Africa at the site of the Molteno Dam.

== History ==
The plant was the first hydro-electric plant in South Africa and first power plant in Cape Town. It was the second electric power plant in South Africa. The city of Kimberly had power to light up its street lights in 1882. The Graaff Electric Lighting Works power plant was commissioned by the Cape Town City Council in April 1895 after the completion of the Molteno Reservoir that was constructed to help supply potable water to the rapidly growing city.

The plant was named after David de Villers-Graaff who was mayor of Cape Town from 1891 to 1892 and personally funded the construction of the power plant. Costing £75,000 in 1895, equivalent to R29,330,000 in 2018. Graaff was a big proponent of the then relatively new technology of electricity, especially for public lighting. Demand for electricity was driven by the need for street lights to help reduce crime in the city.

The plant had two 150 kW generators which could be driven either by steam or water power. Water to power the generators was supplied from the Woodhead Reservoir on Table Mountain. For the twelve months before 30 June 1896 the plant ran for 2590 hours on water power and for 691 hours on coal fired steam power. The plant powered 775 public street lights throughout the city of Cape Town.

The plant was decommissioned in 1920 and declared a national monument in 1993.

== Current status ==
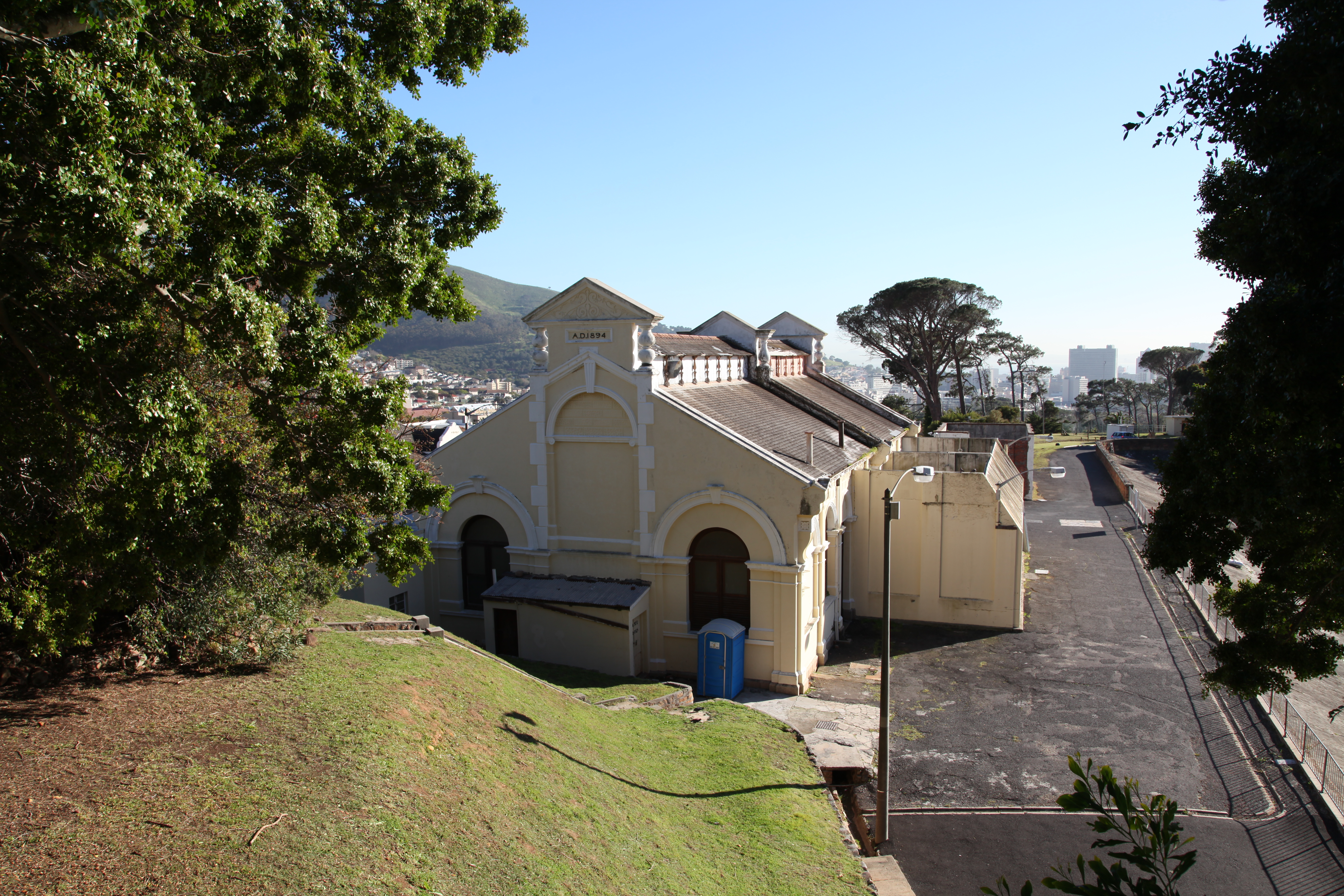
The old power plant building in 2012 as seen from its southern side.

The power plant building still stands at the west of the Molteno Dam and is a registered national monument. In 2015 plans were announced to renovate the building so as to house a “Museum for ‘water heritage’”. However officials also stated that since the site sits close to the reservoir it is unlikely that the site will ever be open to the public due to security concerns.
