= Jacobus Arnoldus Graaff =

South African politician

Sir Jacobus Arnoldus Combrinck Graaff, KCMG
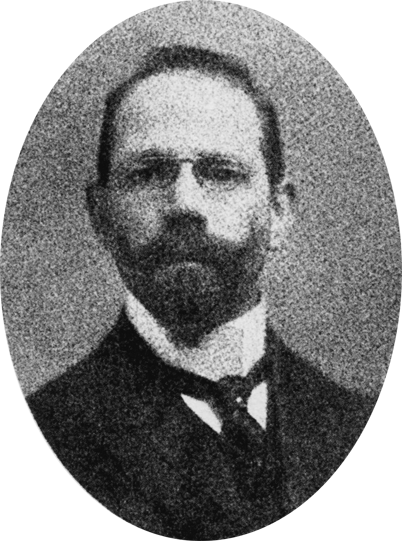
- Born: 4 March 1863; Villiersdorp, Cape Colony
- Died: 5 April 1927 (aged 64); England
- Occupations: Businessman, politician

Sir Jacobus Arnoldus Combrinck Graaff KCMG (4 March 1863 – 5 April 1927), also known as 'Sir James', was a South African cabinet minister, Senator, businessman, and South African Party whip.

Jacobus Graaff, younger brother of Sir David Graaff, was born on the Wolfhuiskloof farm near Villiersdorp in 1863. Following his father's death in 1875, he left Villiersdorp to work with his brother David at the Combrinck & Co. butchery in Cape Town. In partnership with his brother he took over the business in 1881. In 1899 he and his brother co-founded and was a partner in the Imperial Cold Storage and Supply Company.

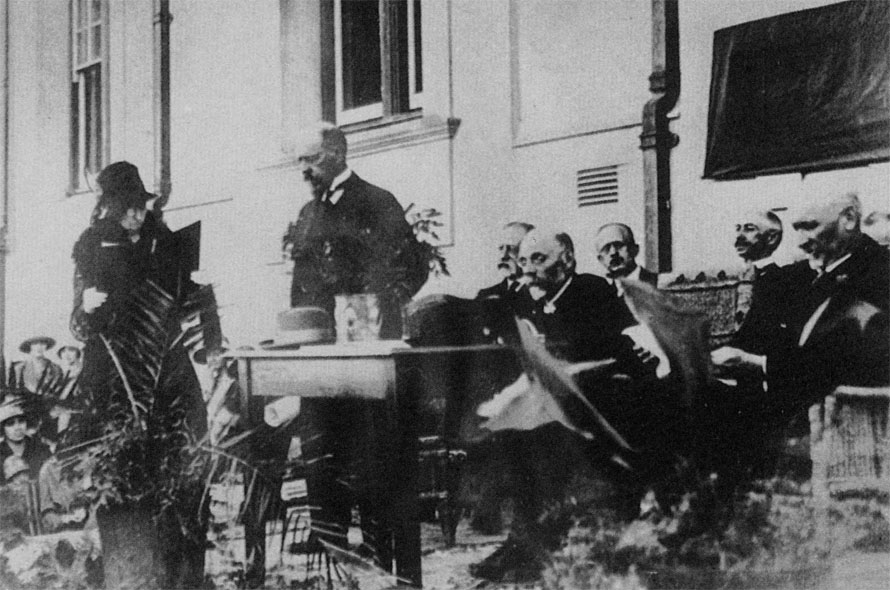
David Graaff and his brother Jacobus Graaff presenting a £100,000 donation to the De Villiers Graaff High School in 1907. David Graaff is making a speech, Jacobus Graaff is sitting to the right and Jan Smuts is seated in the extreme right.

He was chairman of the Afrikaner Bond's Cape Town branch and was elected to the Legislative Council representing the northwestern Cape in 1903. After the Union of South Africa was formed in 1910, he became a senator. From 1913 to 1920, he was minister without portfolio in Louis Botha's cabinet. He was minister of public works, posts and telegraphs in Jan Smuts's second ministry. He was knighted as a Knight Commander of the Order of St Michael and St George (KCMG) in 1917.

In 1907, Jacobus and his brother made a GB£100,000 donation (equivalent to £41,100,000 or R471,195,167 in 2010) for the establishment of the De Villiers Graaff High School in Villiersdorp.

He lived in a large mansion, Bordeaux, on the beach front in Sea Point, Cape Town. Graaffs Pool, the walled off ocean backed tidal pool on the beach opposite Bordeaux, was named after him.

Jacobus Graaff married Susanna Elizabeth Marie Theunissen of Vergelegen, Somerset West, in 1889. They had four Children: Johanna Veronique Waterson Graaff (1890), Petrus Norbertus Graaff (1892), Willem Jan Hofmeyer Graaff (1897) and Jacobus Arnoldus Combrinck Graaff (1906).

== See also ==
- Imperial Cold Storage and Supply Company
- Meat packing industry

Political offices
Preceded by Orr, T.	Minister of Communications, Telecommunications and Postal Services; 1920–1921	Succeeded by Watt, T.
