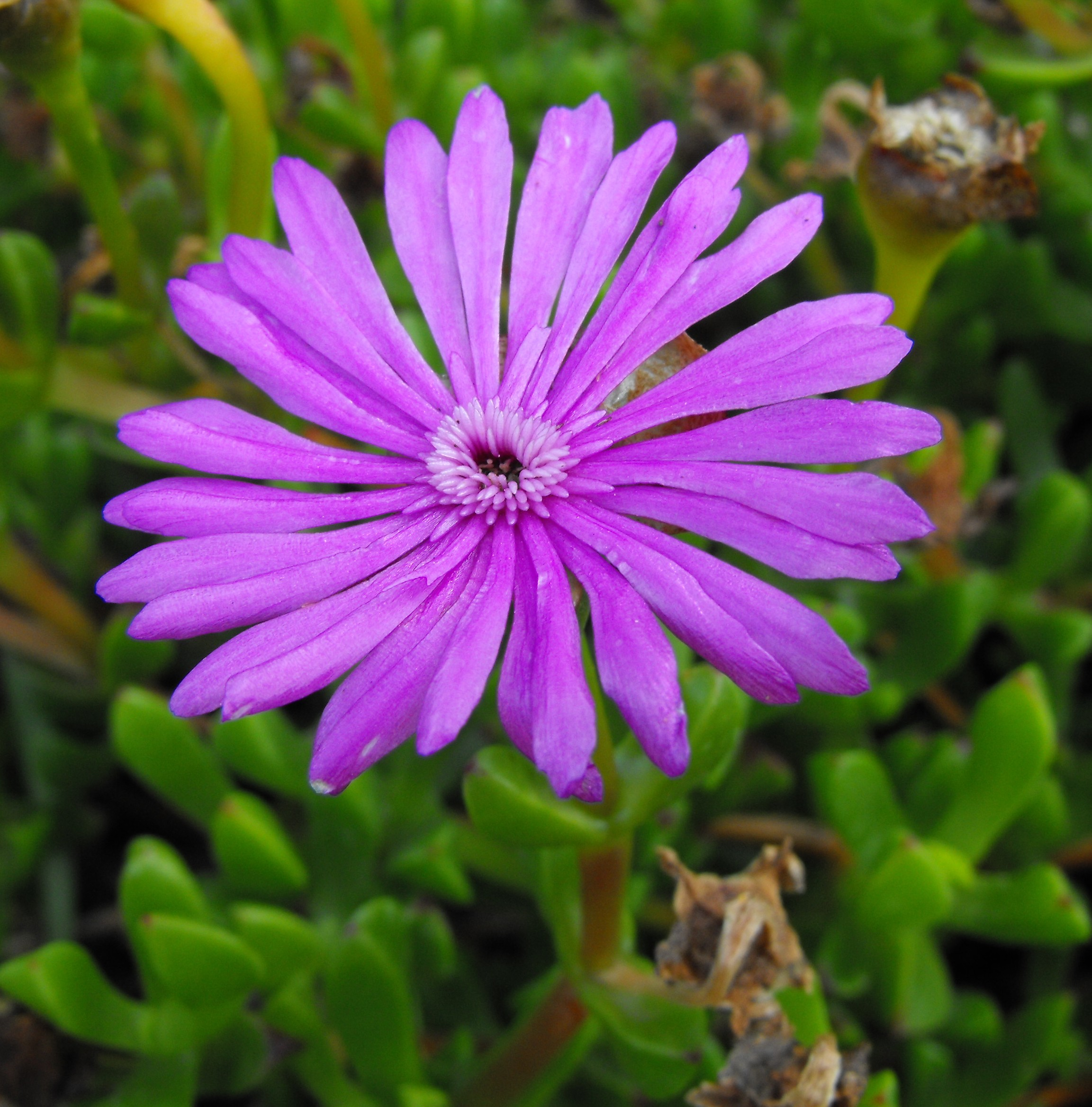

Scientific classification
- Kingdom: Plantae
- Clade: Tracheophytes
- Clade: Angiosperms
- Clade: Eudicots
- Order: Caryophyllales
- Family: Aizoaceae
- Subfamily: Ruschioideae
- Tribe: Ruschieae
- Genus: Erepsia; N.E.Br.

Synonyms
- Circandra N.E.Br.; Kensitia Fedde; Piquetia N.E.Br.; Semnanthe N.E.Br.

= Erepsia =

Genus of plants

Erepsia is a genus of flowering plants belonging to the family Aizoaceae. It is native to the Cape Provinces of South Africa.

== Species ==
31 species are accepted.

- Erepsia anceps (Haw.) Schwantes
- Erepsia aperta L.Bolus
- Erepsia aristata (L.Bolus) Liede & H.E.K.Hartmann
- Erepsia aspera (Haw.) L.Bolus
- Erepsia babiloniae Liede
- Erepsia bracteata (Aiton) Schwantes
- Erepsia brevipetala L.Bolus
- Erepsia × caledonica L.Bolus
- Erepsia distans L.Bolus
- Erepsia dubia Liede
- Erepsia dunensis (Sond.) Klak
- Erepsia esterhuyseniae L.Bolus
- Erepsia forficata (L.) Schwantes
- Erepsia gracilis (Haw.) L.Bolus
- Erepsia hallii L.Bolus
- Erepsia heteropetala (Haw.) Schwantes
- Erepsia inclaudens (Haw.) Schwantes
- Erepsia insignis (Schltr.) Schwantes
- Erepsia lacera (Haw.) Liede
- Erepsia oxysepala (Schltr.) L.Bolus
- Erepsia patula (Haw.) Schwantes
- Erepsia pentagona (L.Bolus) L.Bolus
- Erepsia pillansii (Kensit) Liede
- Erepsia polita (L.Bolus) L.Bolus
- Erepsia polypetala (A.Berger & Schltr.) L.Bolus
- Erepsia promontorii L.Bolus
- Erepsia ramosa L.Bolus
- Erepsia saturata L.Bolus
- Erepsia serrata (L.) L.Bolus
- Erepsia simulans (L.Bolus) Klak
- Erepsia steytlerae L.Bolus
- Erepsia villiersii L.Bolus
