= De Villiers Graaff High School =

Coordinates: 33°59′08″S 19°17′32″E

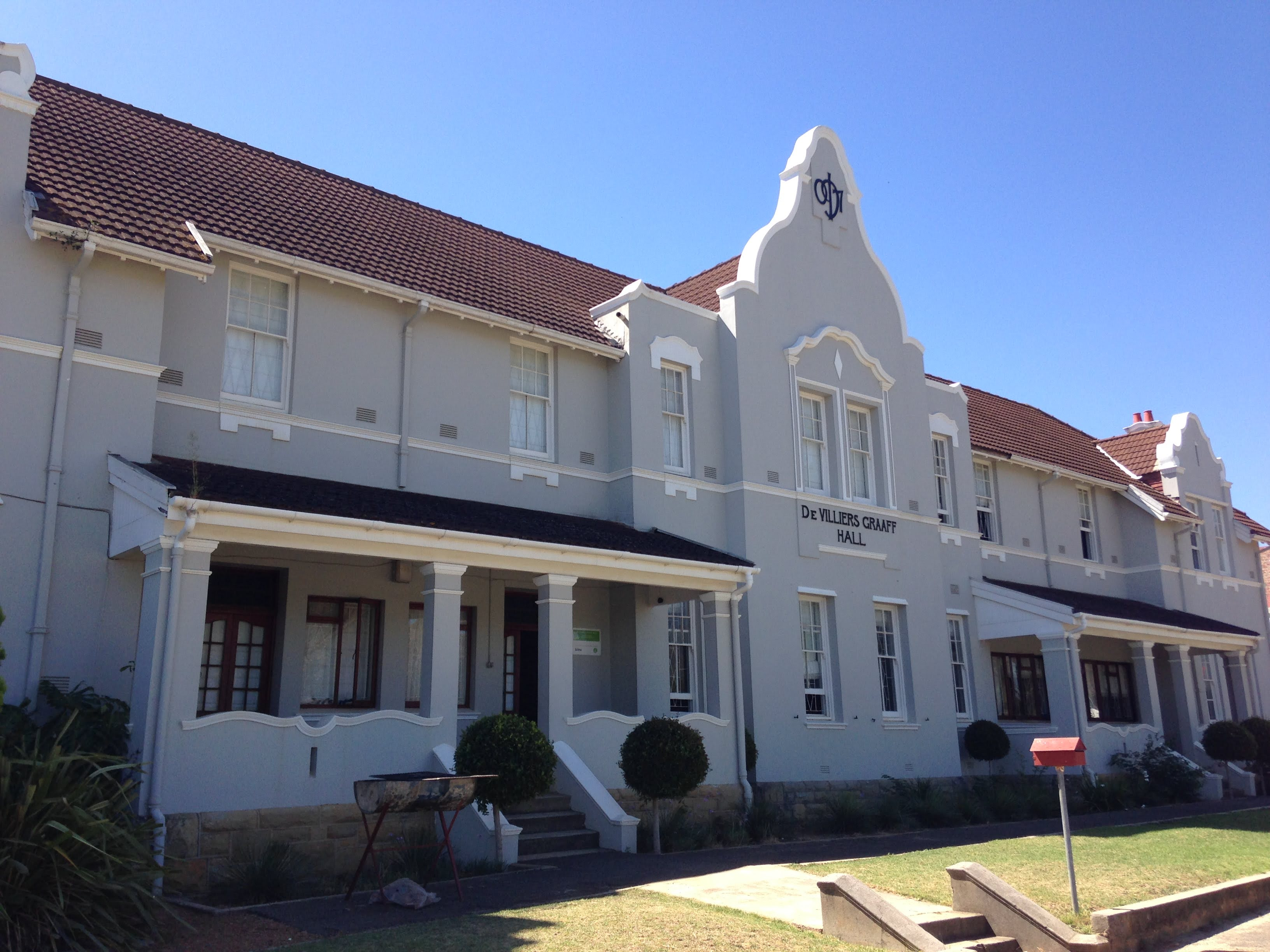
- Graaffsaal Hostel
- Villiersdorp; South Africa

Information
- Type: Mixed-sex education state school
- Motto: Doctrina Vim Promovet Insitam
- Established: 1872
- Headmistress: Ms B Franken
- Grades: 8 - 12
- Houses: Theresa, du Raan
- Website: http://www.dvghs.co.za/

De Villiers Graaff High School is an academic state secondary school in Villiersdorp, a small town approximately 150 km from Cape Town, South Africa. It was founded in 1872 and is also known by the acronym "DVG".

== History ==
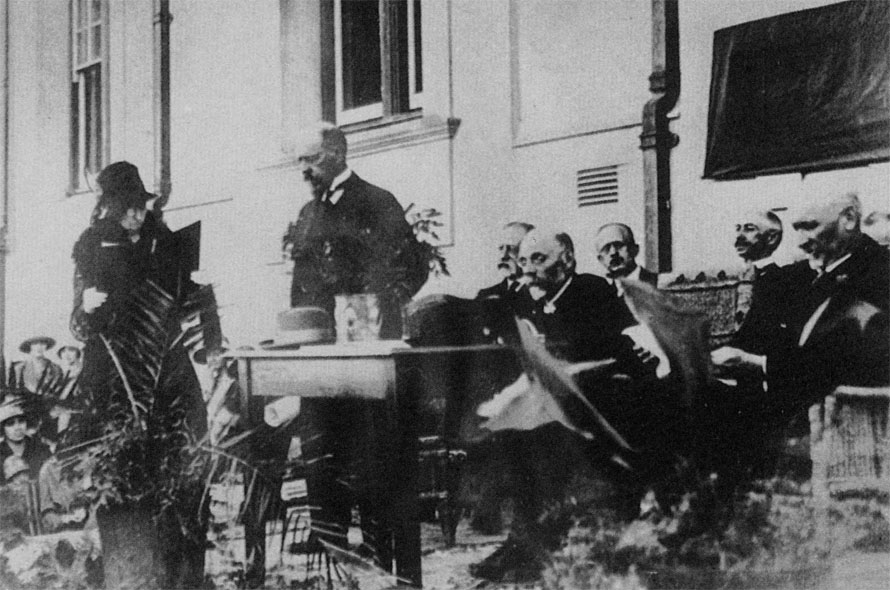
David Graaff and his brother Jacobus Graaff presenting a £100,000 donation to the De Villiers Graaff High School in 1907. David Graaff is making a speech, Jacobus Graaff is sitting to the right and Jan Smuts is seated in the extreme right.

Though officially established in 1872, Sir David de Villiers Graaff and his brother Jacobus, financed the construction of the High School in 1907 with the Dutch style buildings being designed by Cape Town architectural firm Parker and Forsyth. Together the Graaff brothers established a GB£100 000 (equivalent to £41,100,000 or R471,195,167 in 2010) endowment fund for the school. Originally consisting of three boys boarding houses, Malherbe House, Graaff Hall and du Raan (which housed high as well as primary school children), and one girls boarding house, Theresa House (which also housed high and primary school girls), in the last 15–20 years only du Raan and Theresa remain operational.

== Culture ==
The school offers a range of cultural and social activities and societies.

On a social level, annual activities include the Matric Ball, Mr and Ms DVG, a Valentine’s dinner social and the Oscadis review concert. Culturally, the school offers Religious Youth Action, choir, first aid, drama, debate and the Representative Student Counsel.

== Notable alumni ==
- Colin Eglin, politician

== Gallery ==
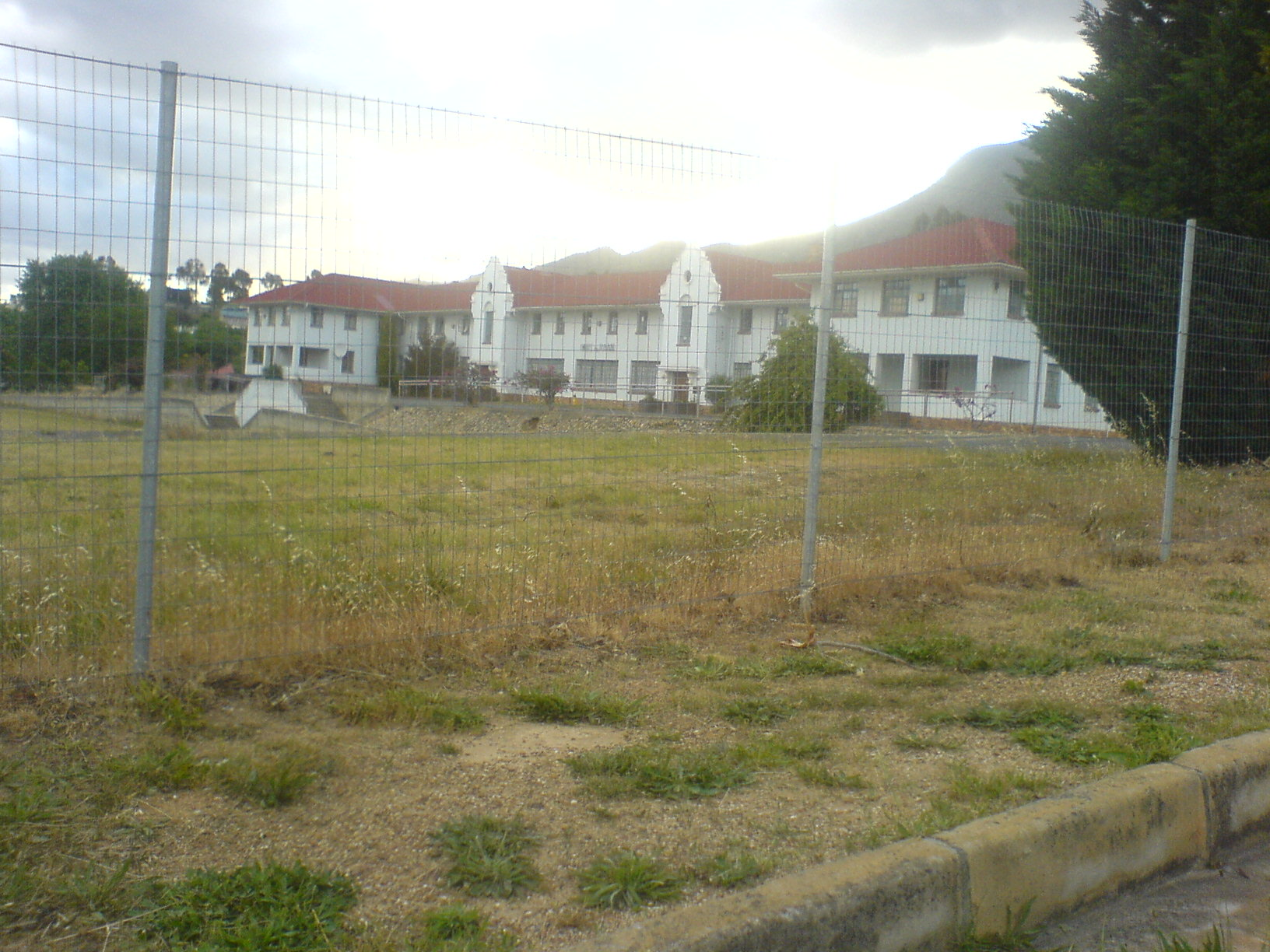
The boys hostel, du Raan House

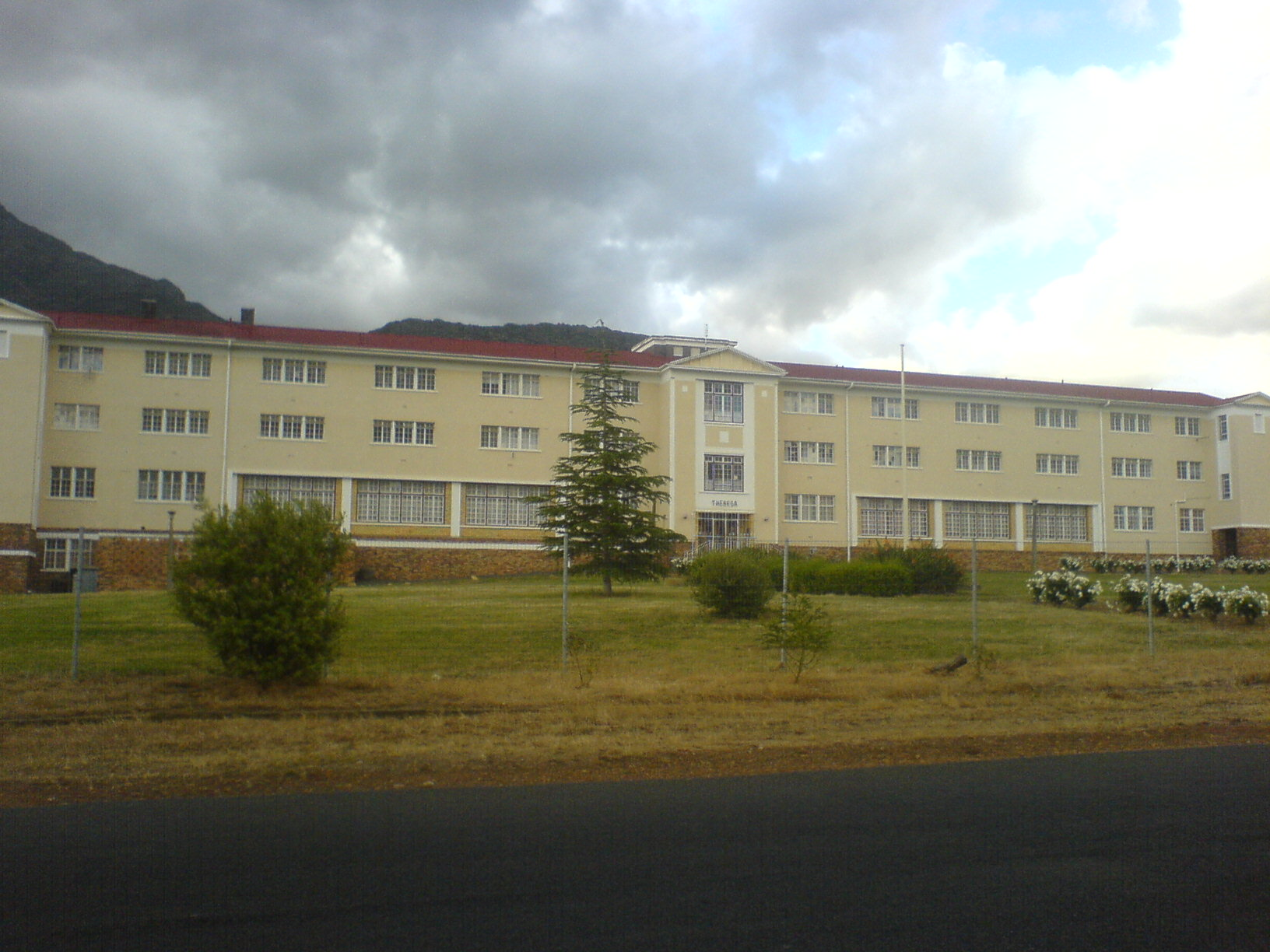
The girls hostel, Theresa House

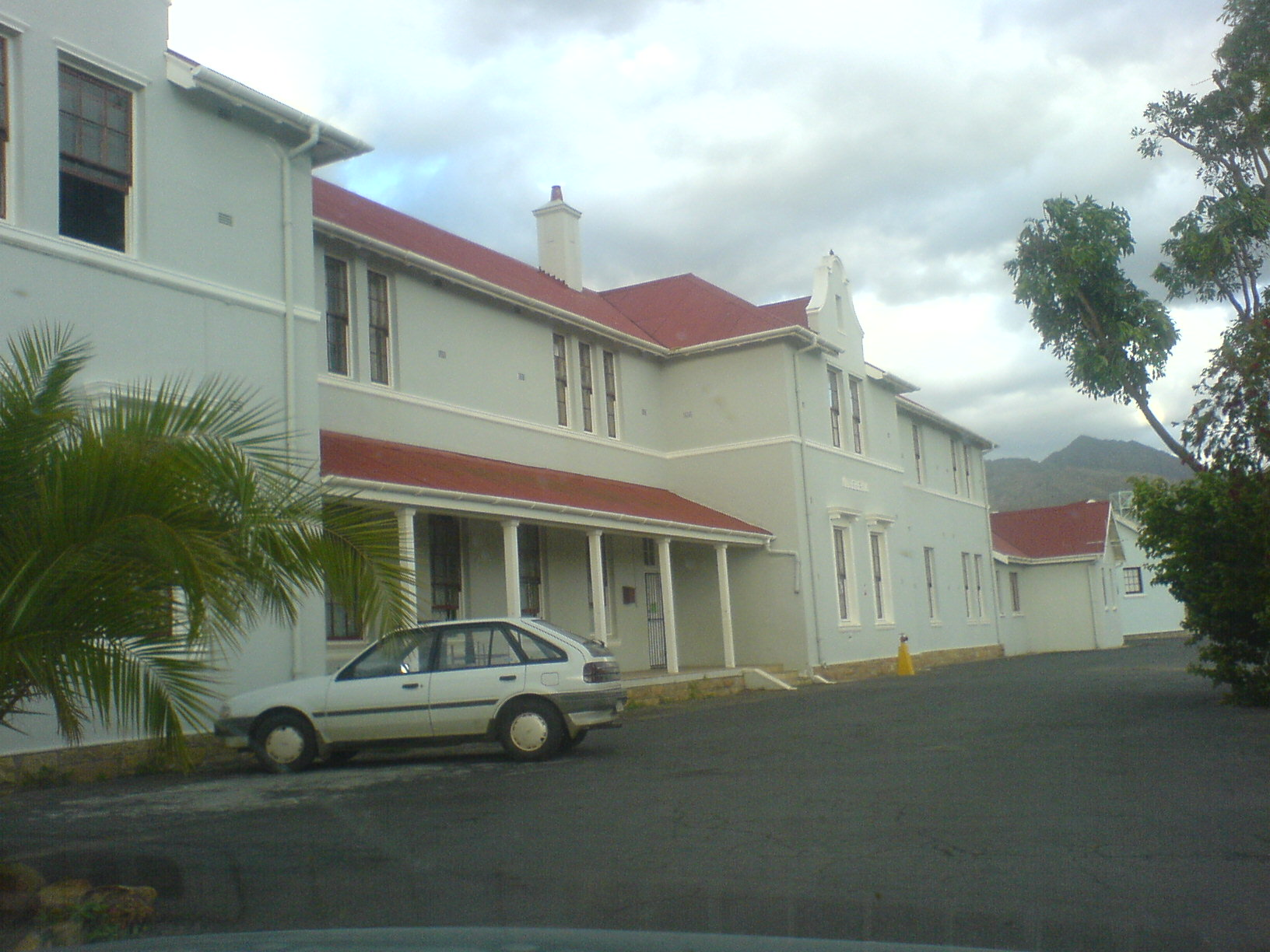
The vacant Malherbe House

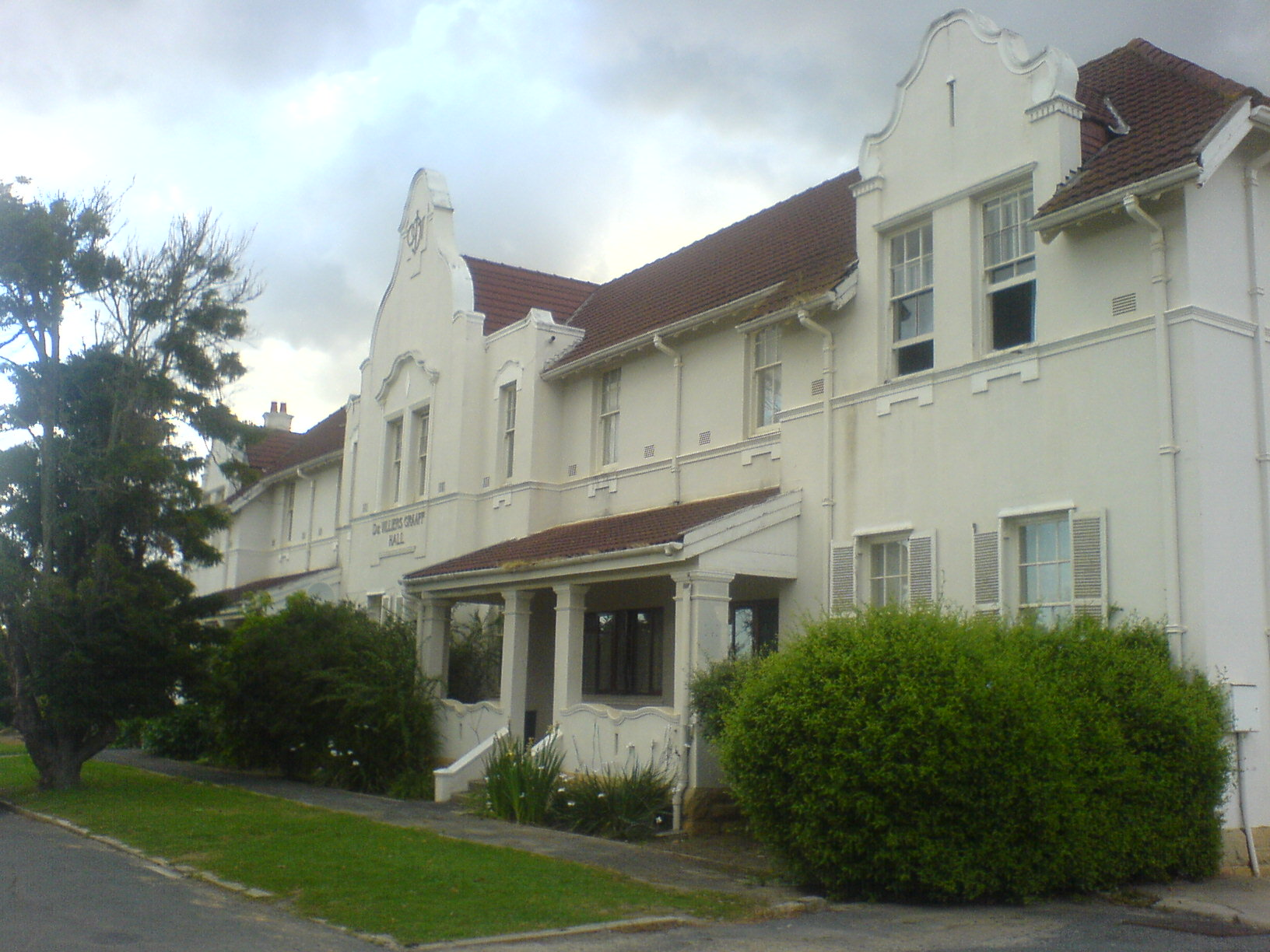
The discontinued Graaff Hall
