= Molteno Dam =

Historic dam in Cape Town, South Africa

The Molteno Dam
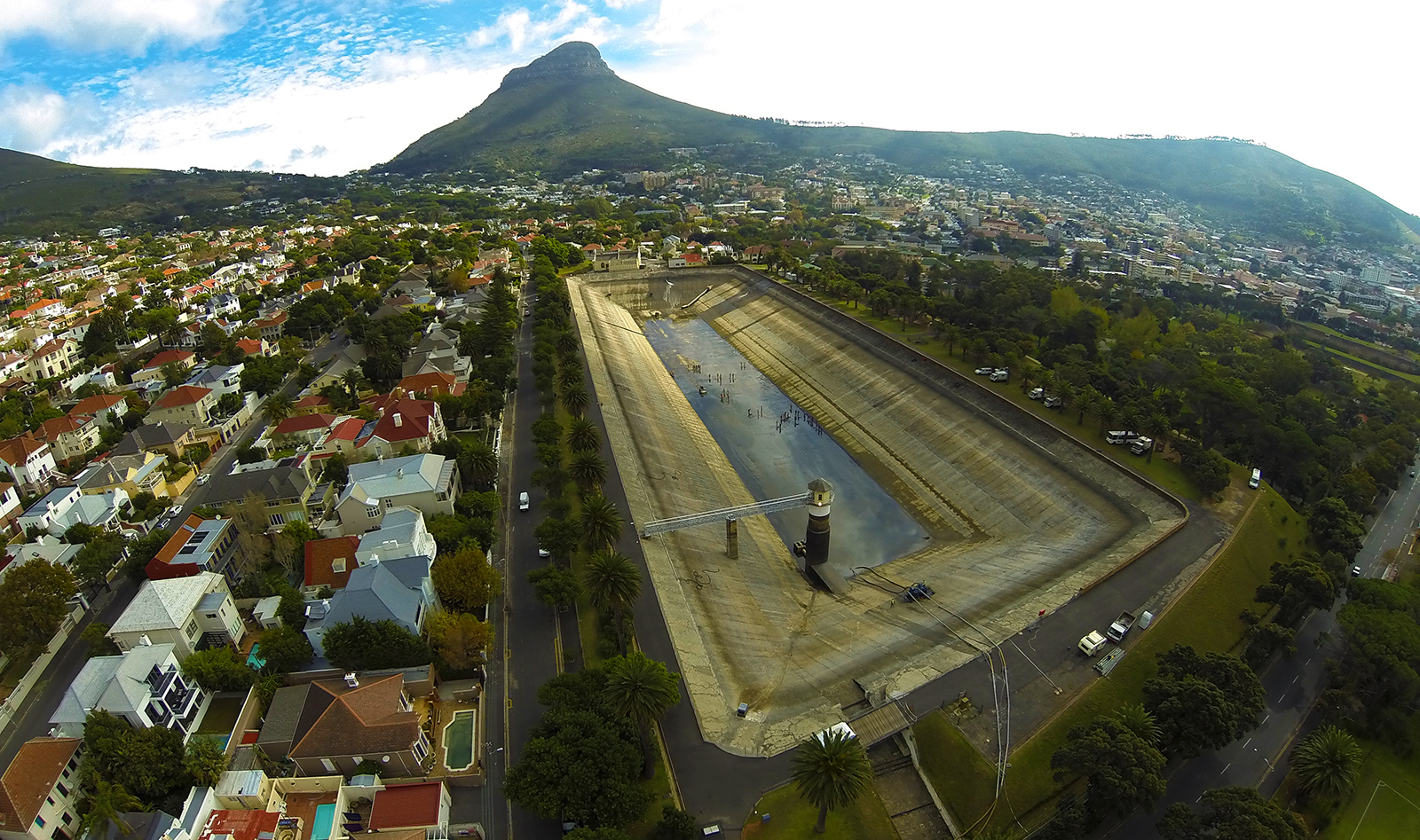
- An aerial photograph of the Molteno Dam in Oranjezicht, Cape Town.
- Interactive map of The Molteno Dam
- Official name: The Molteno Dam
- Country: South Africa
- Location: Western Cape
- Coordinates: 33.9385°S 18.412°E
- Purpose: Domestic and Municipal use
- Construction began: 1877
- Opening date: 1881
- Owner: City of Cape Town Waterworks

Dam and spillways
- Type of dam: Earth fill dam
- Height: 21 m
- Length: 285 m
- Width (base): 100 m

Reservoir
- Total capacity: 3 000 000 m^{3}
- Surface area: 2.85 ha

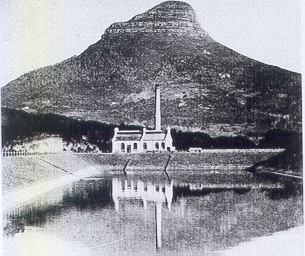
A photo of Molteno Dam soon after construction, with Lions Head in the background. The white building behind the dam is the Graaff Electric Lighting Works, Cape Town's first power plant.

Molteno Dam is a small but historic dam, on the lower slopes of Table Mountain in Western Cape, South Africa. Still in service, it was established in 1877 and is now located in the suburb of Oranjezicht, Cape Town.

== Background and construction ==
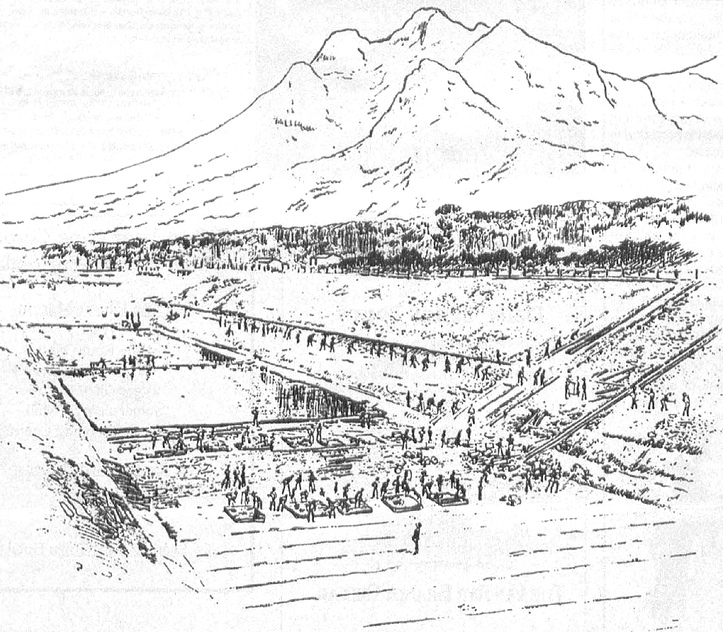
A 19th Century sketch of the dam's construction - a formidable engineering challenge for the early Cape.

In earlier days, the infant settlement of Cape Town had been supplied with water from Table Mountain by way of canals or "grachts" (such as Buitengracht, Kaizergracht and Heerengracht - now major streets). When these canals had to be covered due to public health concerns, the elders of the city agreed on the need to build a dam up on the Table Mountain slope above the growing city, to store water from the mountain's springs. This water would otherwise have flowed directly into the sea - a shameful waste in the eyes of the city's administrators. By the late 1860s, Cape Town was also facing severe water restrictions, partly due to its expanding population.

The dam's actual construction was part of a huge expansion of infrastructure that was begun by the government of the country's first Prime Minister John Molteno (after whom it was later named), who appointed the Cape's first water engineer Mr John Gamble, as well as the mayor David Graaff. Soon after the dam was opened, the first power-plant in South Africa, the Graaff Electric Lighting Works (named after the Mayor), was constructed next to the reservoir.

The dam was intended to hold over 50,000,000 gallons of water, in sandy porous clay which presented an engineering challenge from the outset. The solution, only implemented years later, involved a mixture of excavation and masonry-supported embankments.

== History ==
The reservoir provided sufficient storage capacity for the young city for decades to come, until massive urbanisation in the 20th century meant drawing on the much larger Western Cape Water Supply System.

Several unusual incidents have punctuated the dam's long history. With the invention of the hot air balloon, renowned balloonist Isidore Michaels made an ascent in Cape Town, from the nearby public gardens, in spite of the prevailing winds. To the horror of spectators, his balloon swept towards the mountain and landed in the middle of the dam, entangling and drowning the balloonist. A structural disaster occurred in the 1880s. The reservoir was overfilled and accidentally breached, causing a wave of water to rush down into the city. The deluge destroyed houses, uprooted trees and swept away belongings. Following its repair however, the dam has served Cape Town faithfully and still supplies the city centre today.

== Modern usage ==
The dam, and the nearby Molteno Spring (one of over 20 springs located in the Cape Town city bowl), form part of the natural waterway that was originally known as "Camissa" (meaning "Sweet Waters" in Khoi). This became part of a network of streams and grachts that historically stretched across early Cape Town. A citizen activated, non-profit community programme is currently underway to restore the city's historic water systems, of which the dam formed a small but crucial part.

While the greater city has far out-grown it, the dam is still used as part of the city's modern water system, supplying the Company's Garden among other areas. Together with the adjacent De Waal Park, its premises are currently a free and open recreation area for the community.

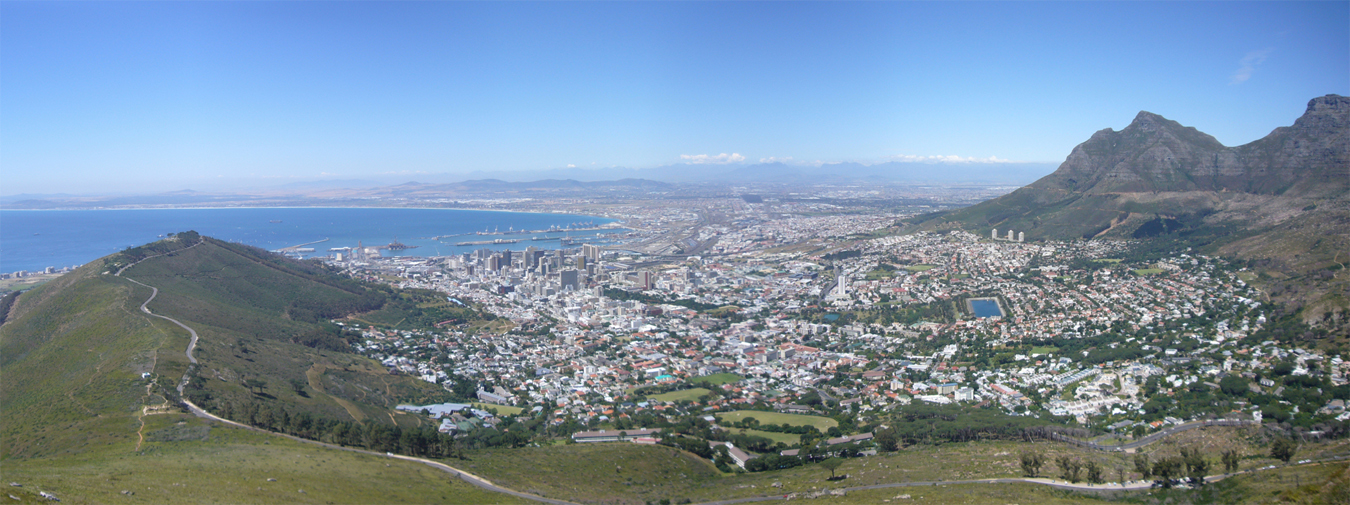
A view of the Cape Town city centre from Lions Head. Molteno Dam is visible in the centre right of the picture. Due to the city's expansion up the mountain slope, the dam is now completely surrounded by suburbs.

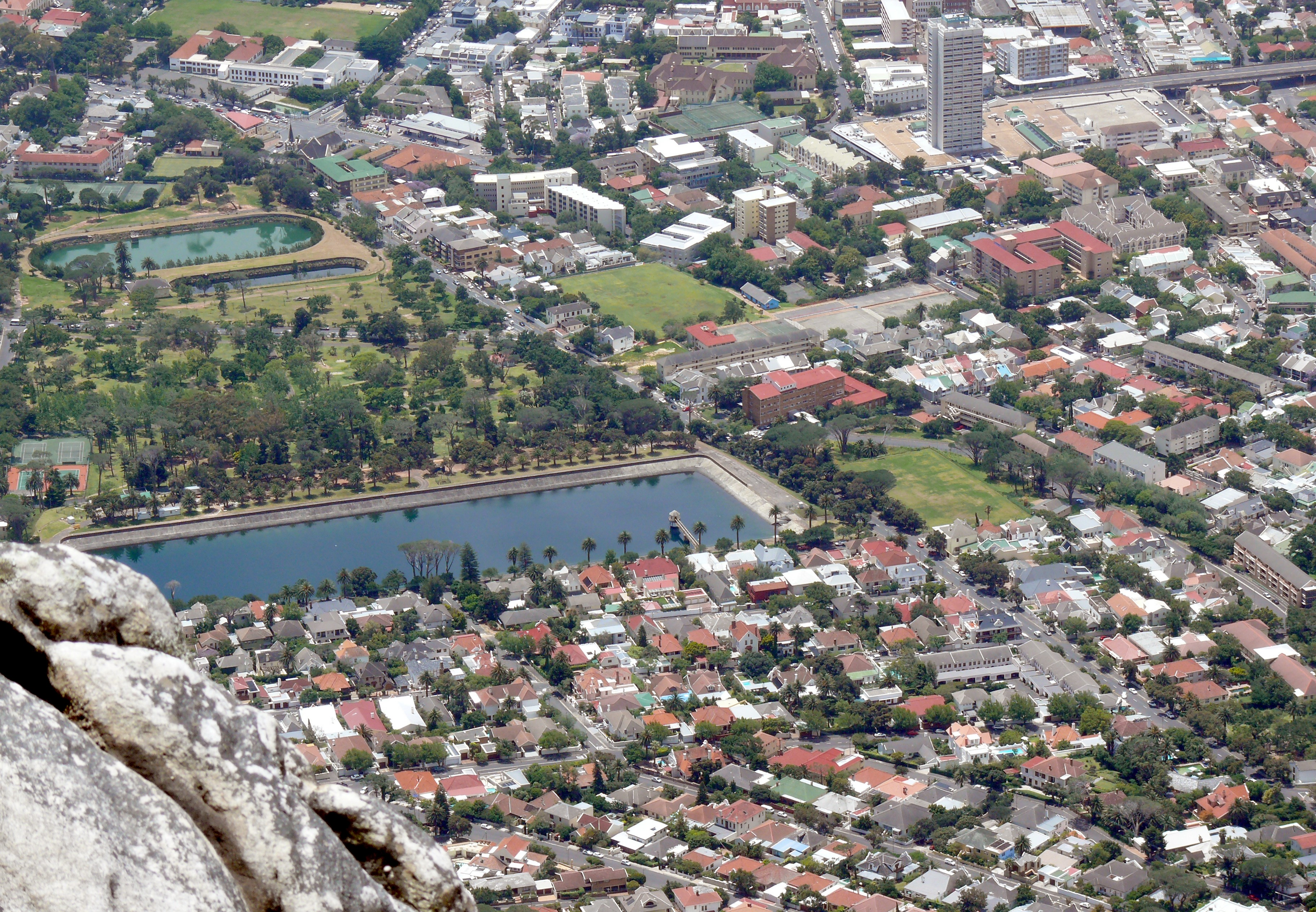
Oranjezicht From the summit of Table Mountain, with Molteno Dam in the foreground

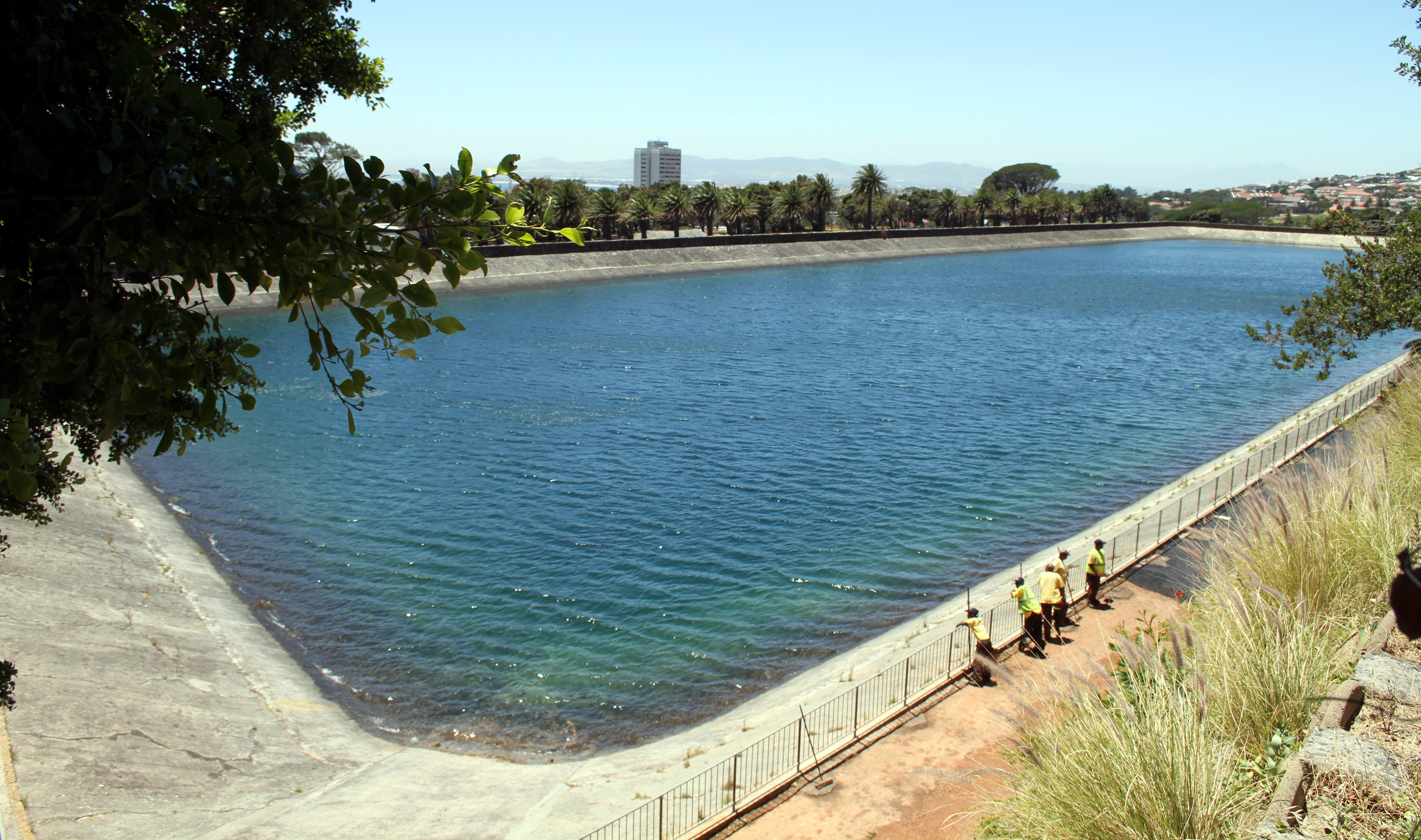
The Molteno Dam from Belvedere Avenue, Oranjezicht

== See also ==
- Oranjezicht
- List of reservoirs and dams in South Africa
