= Sir David Graaff, 1st Baronet =

South African cold storage magnate, politician, and baron

The Honourable Sir David Graaff, Bt
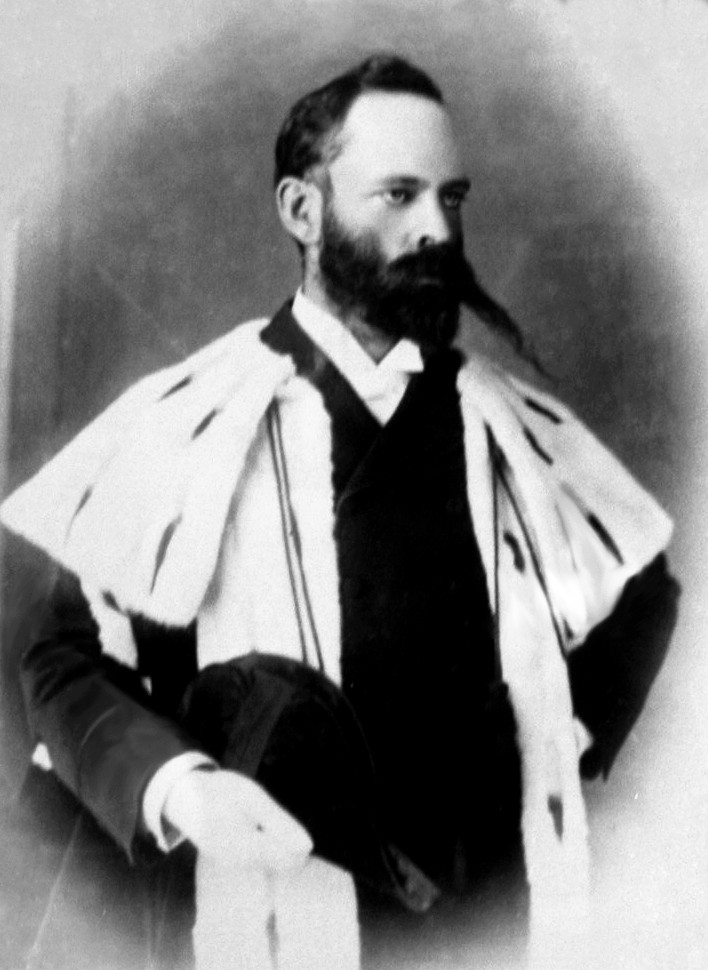
- Sir David Graaff as mayor of Cape Town
- Born: 30 March 1859; Villiersdorp, Cape Colony
- Died: 13 April 1931 (aged 72); Cape Town, Union of South Africa
- Occupations: Businessman, politician

Signature
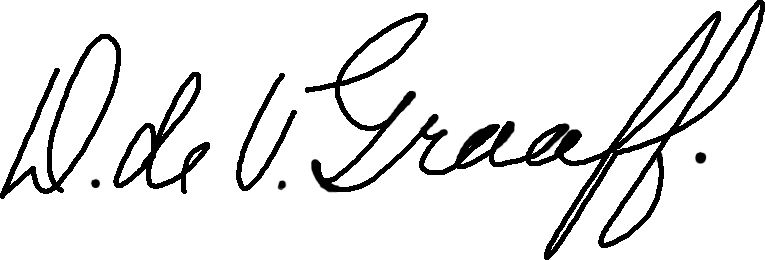

Sir David Pieter de Villiers Graaff, 1st Baronet (30 March 1859 – 13 April 1931) was a South African cold storage magnate and politician. Graaff revolutionized the cold storage industry in Africa. He founded the Imperial Cold Storage and Supply Company in 1899, and aggressively ran it until he left to serve in government. Graaff grew the company into one of the largest in Africa. Graaff's wealth soared, at the turn of the century. During World War I he personally part financed the South African war effort and for this he was knighted as well as for services at the Paris Peace Conference 1919.

== Early life ==
Imperial Cold Storage and Supply Company was founded by Graaff and his brother Jacobus in 1899.

David Graaff was the fourth child of Petrus Novbertus Graaff and Anna Elisabeth. He was born in the small town of Villiersdorp, named after his maternal grandfather, Pieter Hendrik de Villiers, who founded the town in 1841. Little is known of his early childhood other than that his family was very poor. In 1870, at the age of eleven, he went to work in his great-uncle's butchery, Combrinck & CO., in Cape Town, while being privately educated. His great-uncle, Jacobus Arnoldus Combrinck, hoped that Graaff would take over his successful butchery so that he could enter colony politics.

Graaff arrived in Cape Town during a time of rapid economic and population growth. Three years earlier one of the largest deposits of diamonds in history had been discovered in the interior of the county. By the time the Cullinan Diamond was discovered in 1869 the city was flooded with prospectors and investors hoping to capitalise on the discovery. At the time Cape Town was the largest and best developed settlement in southern Africa and served as a major logistics center for prospectors.

In 1881, eleven years after arriving in Cape Town, he and his younger brother Jacobus Arnoldus Graaff took over the business. At the time the business was worth GB£47,000 (£24,300,000 in 2010 pounds). One year later, in 1882, the first commercially successful shipment of refrigerated meat arrived in London from Australia on board the Dunedin. Graaff, realizing the importance of this technological innovation for his butchery business, spent much of the 1880s extensively traveling around the world. Learning all he could about the meat markets and abattoirs of the United Kingdom as well as the meat packing plants of Chicago and the rest of United States. He spent much of the rest of the 1880s and 1890s implementing the techniques and technologies he learned from these trips in his businesses in addition to serving in government.

== Public service and political career (1882–1897) ==
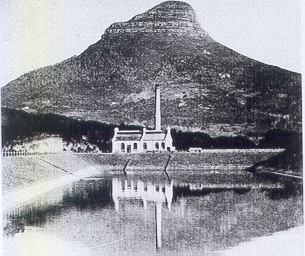
Photograph of the newly completed Graaff Electric Lighting Works next to the Molteno Dam in 1895.

Graaff was also active in public affairs. He was a volunteer soldier, and commanded the Cape Garrison Artillery for a few years. He was a Cape Town city councillor from 1882, and served as mayor in 1891–1892 when he was 32 years old making him the city's youngest mayor. He presented the city with its mayoral chain, which is still in use, and took the lead in introducing electricity into the city. Building the city's first power station which still stands today next to the Molteno Dam. He also played a large role in the construction of many new reservoirs to supply the city with water. Graaff was also a member of parliament from 1891 to 1897.

In 1895, in Cape Town itself the Graaff Electric Lighting Works had begun to operate when a power station was erected near the Molteno reservoir on Table Mountain. The Graaff part of the name refers to David Pieter de Villers-Graaff (created Sir in 1911) who was between 1891 and 1892 Mayor of Cape Town and convinced that the future of electricity was a very "bright" one. The demand for "light" continued and in 1907 the Municipality of Kalk Bay and Muizenberg to supply their customers, built a power station near the beach. A year or so later in 1908 the Woodstock Municipality received their electricity supply from the Dock Road Power Station. Then in 1912 the Cape Town City Council bought the assets of the Claremont Electric Light Works and became the suppliers of both the city and the suburbs.

== Boer War years ==
Graaff left office to focus growing his business and in 1899 he and his brother founded the Imperial Cold Storage and Supply Company. The company grew into one of the largest meat processing and distribution companies in the world and was responsible for generating much of Graaff's fortune. They concentrated on supplying ships, and in conjunction with the Union and Castle shipping lines, they developed the first cold-storage enterprise in South Africa.

It was during this time that Graaff, together with Ernest Oppenheimer, eventually succeeded in bringing all German mining interests together to form the Consolidated Diamond Mines of South-West Africa, under the general control of the Anglo American Corporation. C.D.M. is now the largest producer of gem diamonds in the world, and even though in those days the rich beach terraces stretching north from the Orange River had not been discovered, it was a large-scale producer and as a result of this transaction Anglo American's position as an important factor in the diamond industry had been firmly established.

During the Anglo-Boer War (1899–1902), Graaff obtained lucrative contracts to supply the British Army in the field, but he also made substantial donations towards alleviating the suffering of Boer prisoners of war, and providing medical supplies to Boer women and children held in British Army concentration camps.

When the meat market slumped after the war, Graaff invested in property in and around Cape Town. He bought the farm De Grendel in Plattekloof, outside Cape Town, where he built up a Friesland cattle stud as well as his beloved Arabian horses.

== Political career (1908–1919) ==
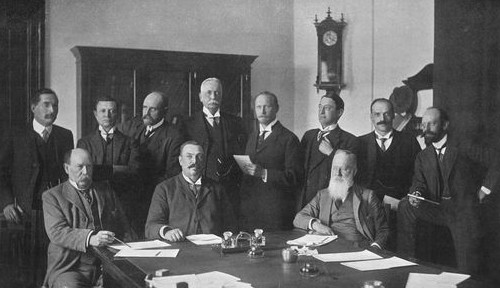
The first cabinet of the Union of South Africa in 1910. Graaff is the first person on the far right.

Graaff was a member of parliament again from 1908 to 1920. He was Minister without Portfolio in the Cape Colony's last cabinet (1908–1910). A close friend and confidant of Gen Louis Botha, the first prime minister of the Union of South Africa, he was created a baronet in 1911 and served as Minister of Public Works and of Posts and Telegraphs (1911–1912), Minister without Portfolio (1912–1913), High Commissioner in London for Union of South Africa (1914) and Minister of Finance (1915–1916). He was a Member of House of Assembly for the Union of South Africa from 1910 to 1920.

He accompanied Botha to the Versailles peace conference in 1919. He was also a close confidant of Gen Jan Smuts and Winston Churchill. He was a member of the National Liberal Club.

== Legacy ==
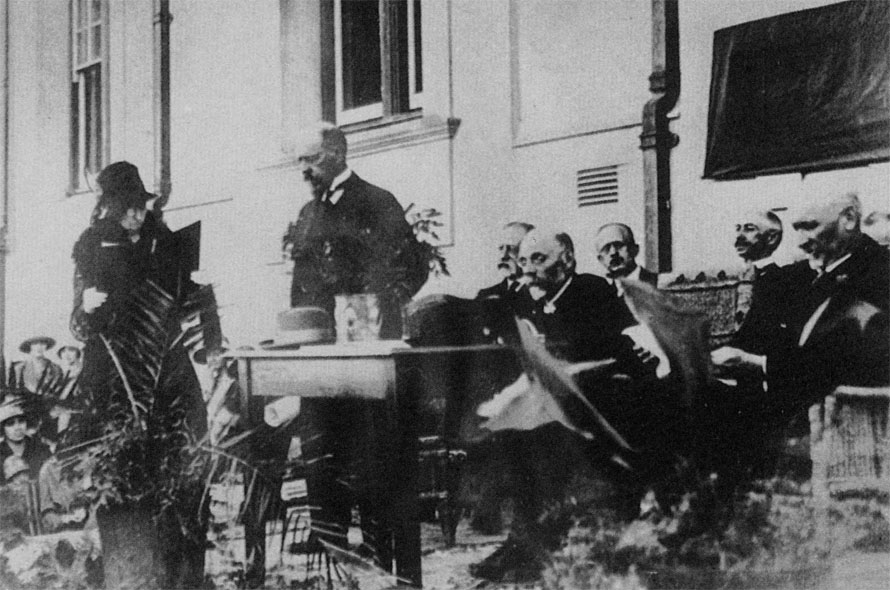
David Graaff and his brother Jacobus Graaff presenting a £100,000 donation to the De Villiers Graaff High School in 1907. David Graaff is making a speech, Jacobus Graaff is sitting to the right and Jan Smuts is seated in the extreme right.

Graaff and his brother financed the building of the De Villiers Graaff High School in Villiersdorp in 1907, establishing a GB£100 000 (equivalent to £10,401,000 in 2025) endowment fund for the school.

When Sir David died in 1931, his estate was consolidated into one company, Graaff's Trust, one of the largest land owners in South Africa.

Apart from his political career his most notable achievements were the construction of the Table Mountain Aerial Cableway, which the family still part own today, as well as large mining and later property interests and investments. His trademark mansions are still scattered around Cape Town today. His beach house Zonnekus on Woodbridge Island, was built by Italian artisans and the material was shipped to South Africa during the great depression. Previously he had built De Grendel, an 8000 hectare stud farm where he bred prized Arab horses.

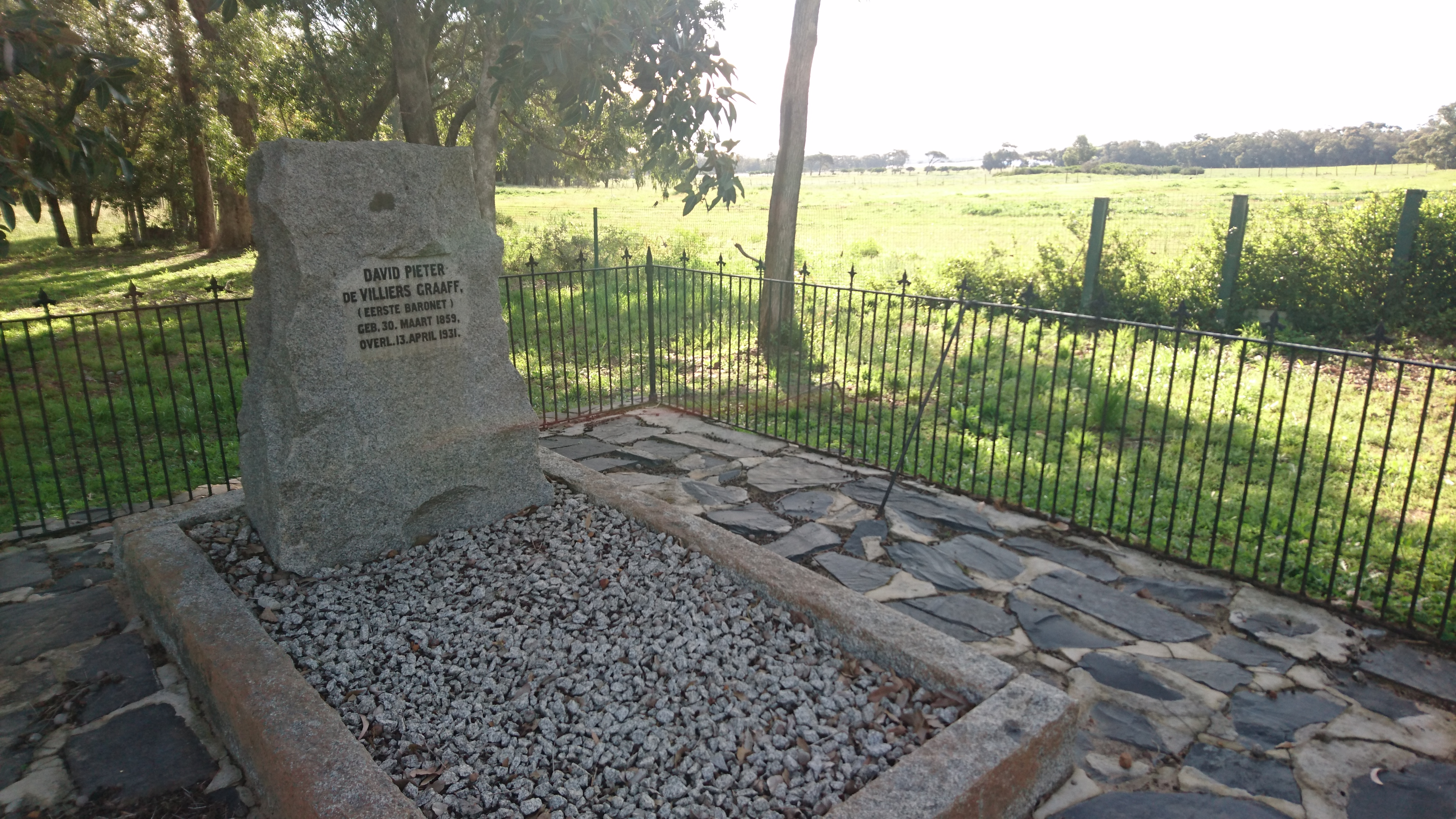
The tombstone of Sir David P. Graaff at De Grendel in Cape Town, South Africa.

He was succeeded as baronet by his eldest son De Villiers. He was also survived by his youngest son, Johannes, a noted Welfare Economist.

Along with other Cape politicians, Graaff is depicted in the 1899 artwork Holiday Time in Cape Town by James Ford.

== See also ==
- Graaff Baronets
- Imperial Cold Storage and Supply Company
- Meat packing industry

== Other References ==
- Dictionary of South African Biography Volume II.
- Barnard, Prof L. and Kriek, Prof D. (Eds) (1990). Sir De Villiers Graaff. Digma, Pretoria.
- Graaff, De Villiers. (1993) "Div Looks Back: The memoirs of Sir De Villiers Graaff". Human & Rousseau, Cape Town.
- Simons, Phillida Brooke. (2000) "Ice cold in Africa: The history of the Imperial Cold Storage & Supply Company Limited". Fernwood Press, Cape Town.

Baronetage of the United Kingdom
New creation	Baronet (of Tygerberg, South Africa); 1911–1931	Succeeded by De Villiers Graaff
Political offices
Preceded by Jan Smuts	Minister of Finance; 1915–1916	Succeeded by Henry Burton
Preceded by Started	Minister of Posts and Telegraphs; 1910–1912	Succeeded by George Leuchars
Preceded by Started	Minister of Public Works; 1910–1912	Succeeded by Thomas Watt
