= Villiersdorp =

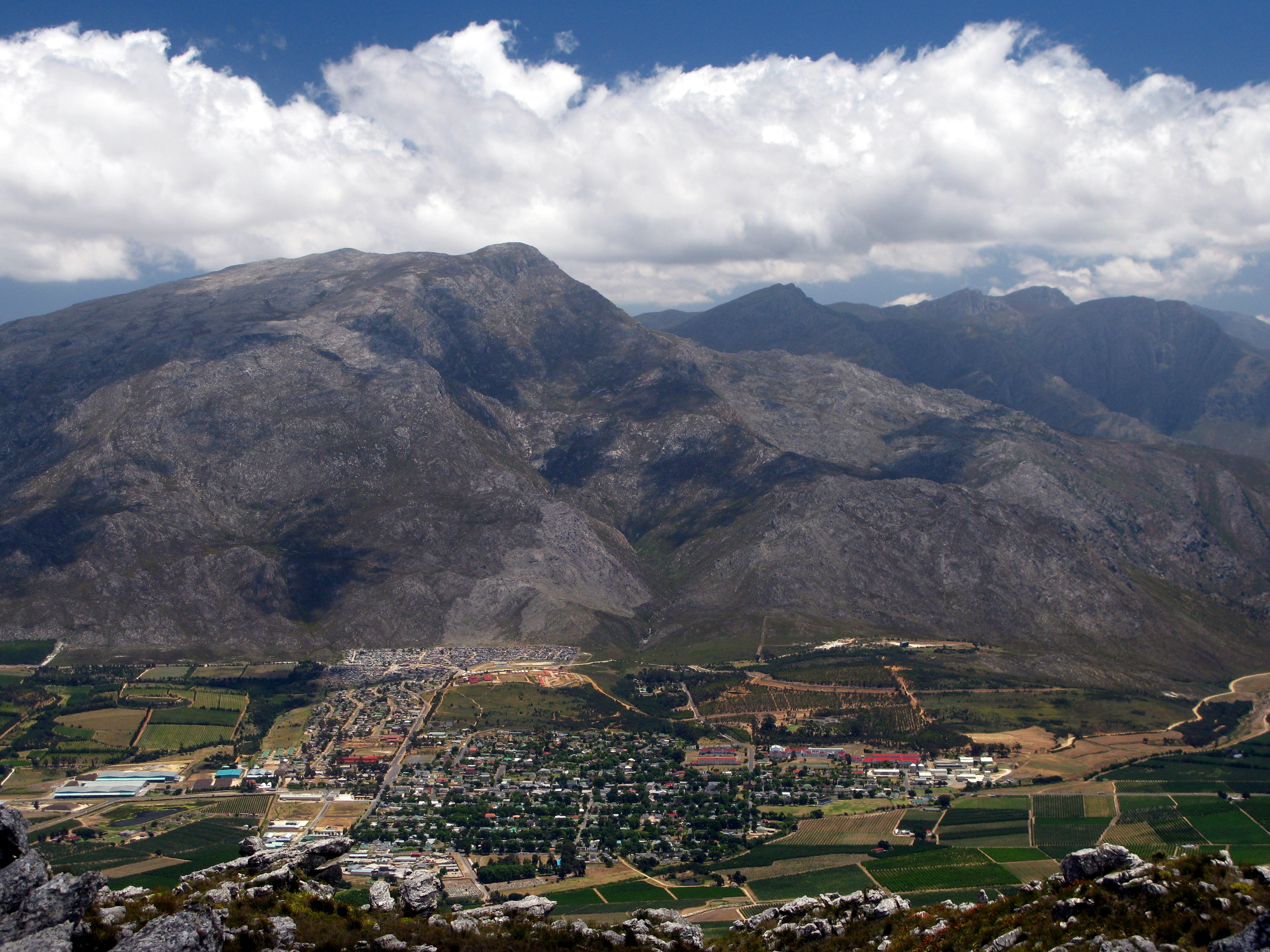
- View of Villersdorp from the surrounding mountains

- Location within Western Cape Location within South Africa
- Coordinates: 33°59′27″S 19°17′22″E
- Country: South Africa
- Province: Western Cape
- District: Overberg
- Municipality: Theewaterskloof
- Established: 1841

Area
  - Total: 2.89 km^{2} (1.12 sq mi)

Population (2011)
  - Total: 10,004
  - Density: 3,460/km^{2} (8,970/sq mi)

Racial makeup (2011)
  - Black African: 40.3%
  - Coloured: 44.7%
  - Indian/Asian: 0.2%
  - White: 12.5%
  - Other: 2.3%

First languages (2011)
  - Afrikaans: 56.5%
  - Xhosa: 24.6%
  - Sotho: 12.8%
  - English: 3.4%
  - Other: 2.7%
- Time zone: UTC+2 (SAST)
- Postal code (street): 6848
- PO box: 6848
- Area code: 028

Villiersdorp is a small town located in the Western Cape province of South Africa in the Overberg region, located near the Theewaterskloof Dam.

Unlike most of the geographical region which specialises in wheat and canola farming, the Villiersdorp Valley is now agriculturally and in micro-climate more similar to the Elgin Valley and Grabouw since the building of the Theewaterskloof Dam, and thus also specialises in deciduous fruit farming and viticulture. The Theewaterskloof Dam, the largest dam in the Western Cape and seventh largest in South Africa and important water supply to Cape Town fills the majority of the valley floor. The Villiersdorp Co-Op is also the only place in South Africa that processes and dries persimmons. The three big packsheds in Villiersdorp, Betko, Arbeidsvreugd and Ideafruit, as well as the Villiersdorp Co-Op process the fruit grown in the area for export and transport to other parts of South Africa. The town is named after Field Cornet Pieter de Villiers, a local farmer who founded the settlement in 1843. There is a lot more packsheds that developed over the years like Fruitways, Provider farming, Vilbo Fruit, Fruit Affair, Kaaimansgat boerdery, Bo Radyn Boerdery, that are not mentioned.

== Notable people ==
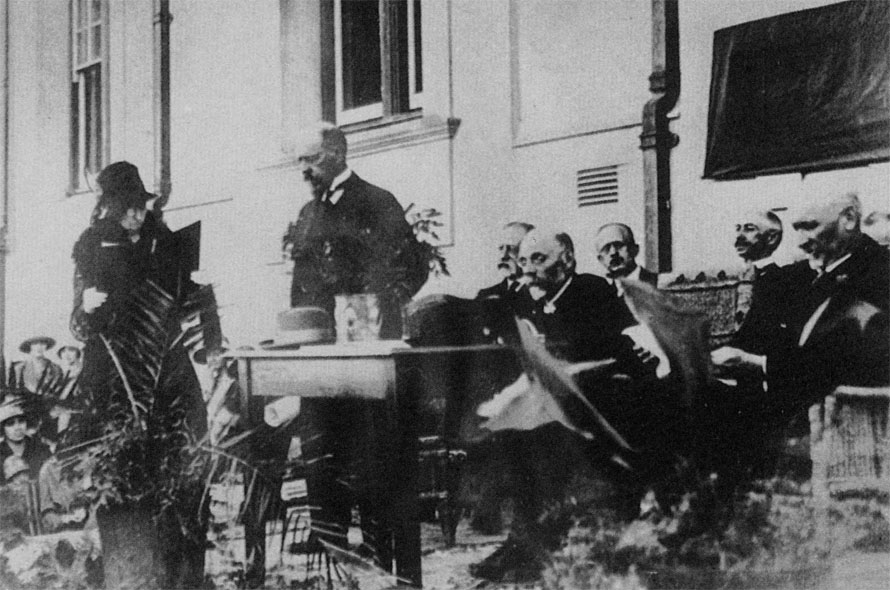
David Graaff and his brother Jacobus Graaff presenting a £100,000 donation to the De Villiers Graaff High School in 1907. David Graaff is making a speech, Jacobus Graaff is sitting to the right and Jan Smuts is seated in the extreme right.

- Sir David Graaff, 1st Baronet and his younger brother Jacobus Arnoldus Graaff were born in Villiersdorp. After making their fortune in Cape Town they went on to found the De Villiers Graaff High School in Villiersdorp in 1907 with an endowment of £100 000 (equivalent to £41,100,000 or R471,195,167 in 2010)
