= Gardens, Cape Town =

Suburb of Cape Town, South Africa

Gardens
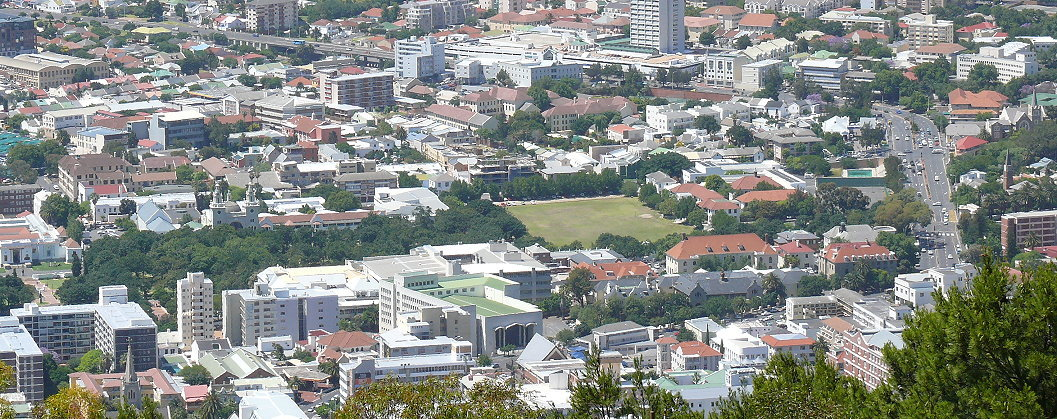
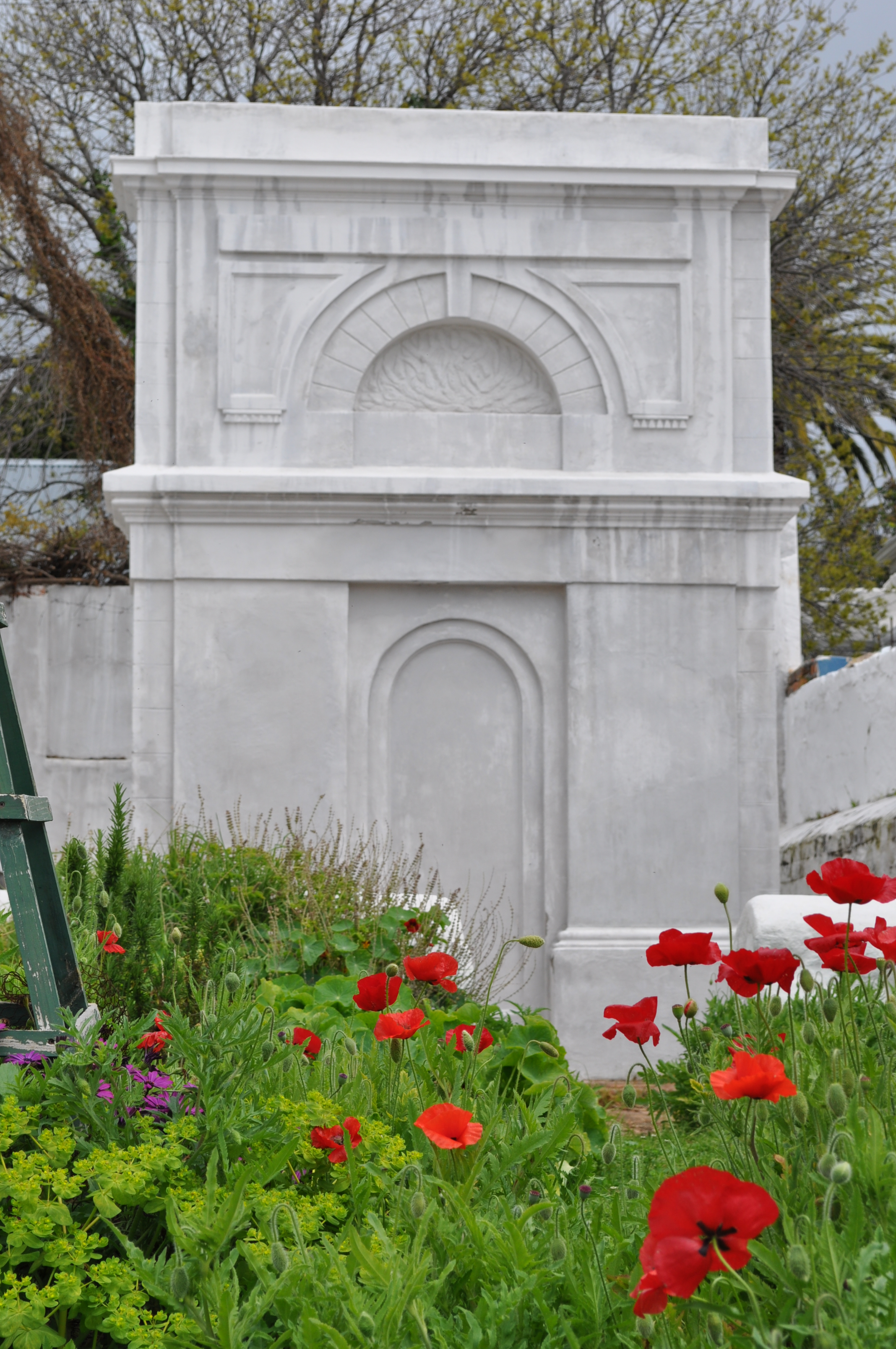
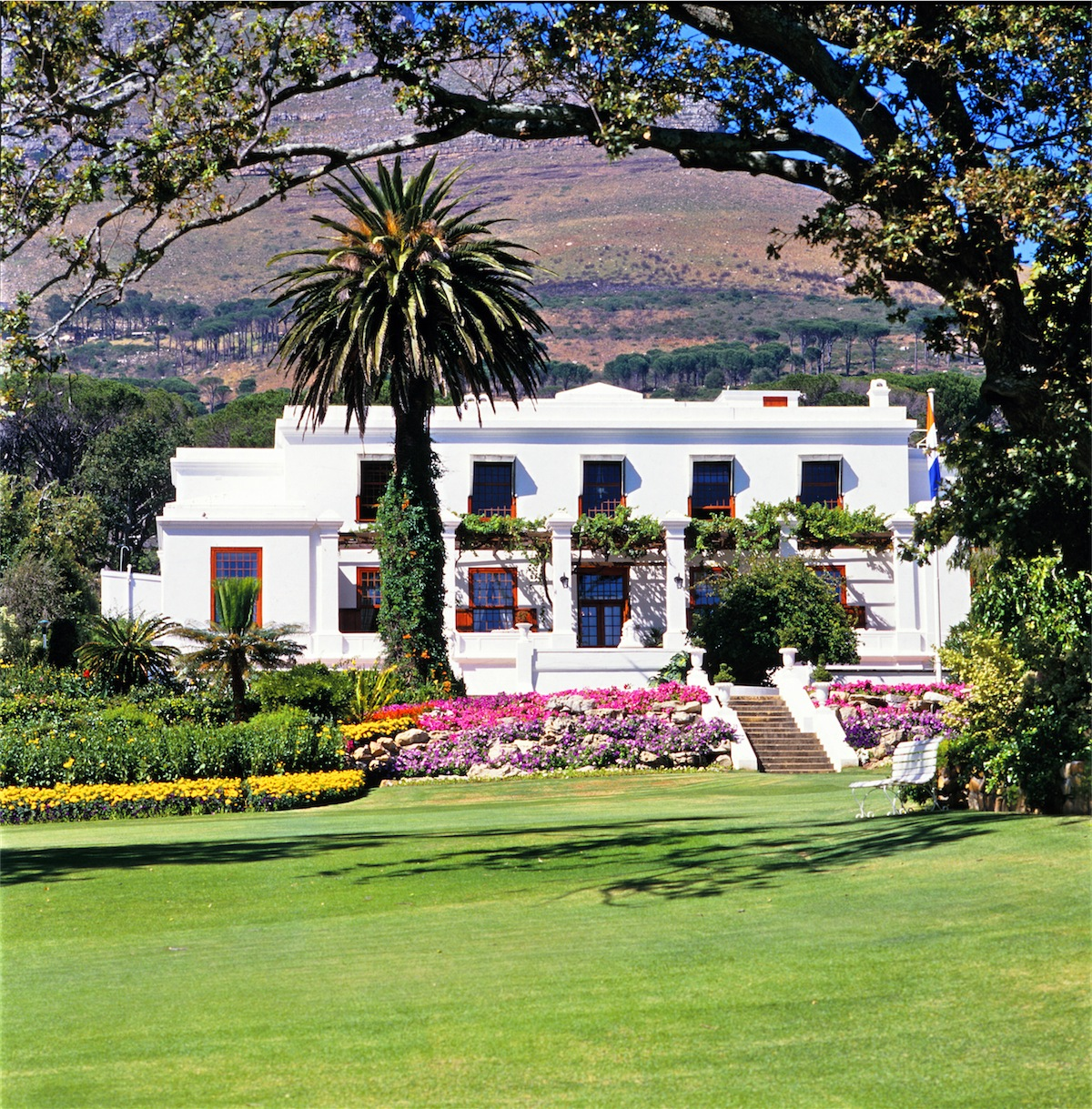
- Clockwise from Top: View of The Gardens area, Leeuwenhof, Van Rheede Van Oudtshoorn Vault
- Interactive map of Gardens
- Location within Western Cape Location within South Africa
- Coordinates: 33°56′0″S 18°24′30″E
- Country: South Africa
- Province: Western Cape
- Municipality: City of Cape Town
- Main Place: Cape Town

Government
  - Councillor: Vivienne Walker (DA)

Area
  - Total: 1.90 km^{2} (0.73 sq mi)

Population (2011)
  - Total: 7,960
  - Density: 4,190/km^{2} (10,900/sq mi)

Racial makeup (2011)
  - Black African: 23.5%
  - Coloured: 7.2%
  - Indian/Asian: 2.0%
  - White: 64.8%
  - Other: 2.5%

First languages (2011)
  - English: 60.4%
  - Afrikaans: 25.3%
  - Xhosa: 3.6%
  - Other: 10.8%
- Time zone: UTC+2 (SAST)
- Postal code (street): 8001

Gardens (or The Gardens) is an affluent, predominantly residential suburb of Cape Town, South Africa. It is located just to the south of the CBD, in the higher elevations of the City Bowl area, and directly beneath Table Mountain and Lion's Head. Gardens is home to several national museums such as Iziko South African National Gallery and the Iziko South African Museum.

The University of Cape Town also houses its Fine Arts department in the suburb, at Michaelis School of Fine Art. Company's Garden, South Africa's oldest garden, a public park and heritage site is a focal point of the suburb. The area is also home to the oldest synagogue in Southern Africa, the Old Shul (now occupied by the South African Jewish Museum) and its successor, the Gardens Shul, "The Mother Synagogue of South Africa."

It is also home to the storied Belmond Mount Nelson Hotel, a luxury hotel dating back to 1899, as well as the Labia Theatre, a beloved independent art house cinema. The main thoroughfare is Kloof Street, known for its fashion stores, second-hand furniture stores, restaurants and art galleries. It also houses Leeuwenhof estate, the official residence of the Premier of the Western Cape. It is a hub for the Cape Town creative industry, home to e.tv at Longkloof Studios and many modelling agencies, production and publishing companies and associated industries.

== History ==
In the early years, the Cape was used as an anchorage for Portuguese, Dutch and British ships. No permanent settlement existed until the Dutch East India Company issued a mandate to Jan van Riebeeck, a ship's surgeon, to establish a settlement which could provide passing ships with fruit, vegetables and fresh meat (traded from the locals).

In 1652 the first garden was laid out by Hendrik Boom, the Company's master gardener, on a site close to the Fresh River (near to the Grand Parade). Later that year, the garden crossed the Fresh River (where Adderley Street is today), and included a medicine garden. Within a few years it was 18 hectares in size.

As more produce became available from the Company's gardens at Newlands and from the Free Burghers who had settled along the Liesbeeck River, the town garden was slowly converted into a botanical and ornamental garden, although the growing of vegetables did continue for a number of years.

The famous kilometre-long Government Avenue, which runs from the top of Adderley Street, also known as 'The Gardens', was originally planted with lemon trees and in 1700 with orange trees. During the time of Simon van der Stel, it was lined with oak trees, which remain today.

The suburb is home to Southern Africa's oldest Jewish congregation. The first Jewish services in the country were held on the day preceding Yom Kippur in 1841, known as Erev Yom Kippur at Benjamin Norden's home, Helmsley Place. The Belmond Mount Nelson Hotel purchased Norden's former home in 1996 and it is now guest accommodation for the hotel.

In the early twentieth century, a Jewish primary school was established on Hope Street, United Hebrew Schools'. A purpose-built school was built at the same site in 1937, replacing the large house that had previously housed the school. The school later became known as Herzlia School and relocated to its current campus in Vredehoek in the 1950s, where a high school was also established.

During apartheid, Vredehoek was designated as a “whites-only” area as part of the Group Areas Act. The Gardens Centre Tower was built in the 1970s in response to a "white housing crisis" in racially segregated Cape Town. In the 1970s the National Party initiated several planning interventions, including the suspension of the city's zoning rules with regards to building height for developers willing to build housing in white Group Areas.

The residential tower and shopping mall replaced a large historic hotel, The International Hotel situated on Upper Mill Street. The South Africa national rugby union team (Springboks) usually stayed there when they were playing in Cape Town. The hotel also hosted bands and concerts over the weekends.

Kloof Street mostly consisted of boarding houses for most of the twentieth century, many have now been converted into restaurants, cafes, boutiques and hotels.

== Places of interest ==
- Belmond Mount Nelson Hotel, one of the oldest and most historic hotels in all of Africa
- Leeuwenhof, the official residence of the Premier of the Western Cape
- Labia Theatre, one of the oldest independent movie theatres in the city

=== Parks ===
- Company's Garden, the oldest garden in South Africa, a public park and heritage site.
- De Waal Park is a public park and heritage site in the neighbouring suburb of Oranjezicht

=== Museums ===
- Iziko South African National Gallery, the national art gallery of South Africa
- Iziko South African Museum, the oldest in the country, was established in 1825 and houses important African zoology, palaeontology and archaeology collections. It also contains a planetarium.
- The South African Jewish Museum, opened in 2000, and housed in purpose-built modern buildings and in the original synagogue, known as 'The Gardens Shul', the oldest Jewish congregation in Southern Africa built in 1862. It is known as the “mother synagogue” of South Africa. The twin-towered 'new' synagogue was built in 1905. Gardens, Vredehoek and Sea Point have traditionally attracted Jewish communities.
- Cape Town Holocaust Centre, Africa's first Holocaust centre, founded in 1999

== Houses of worship ==
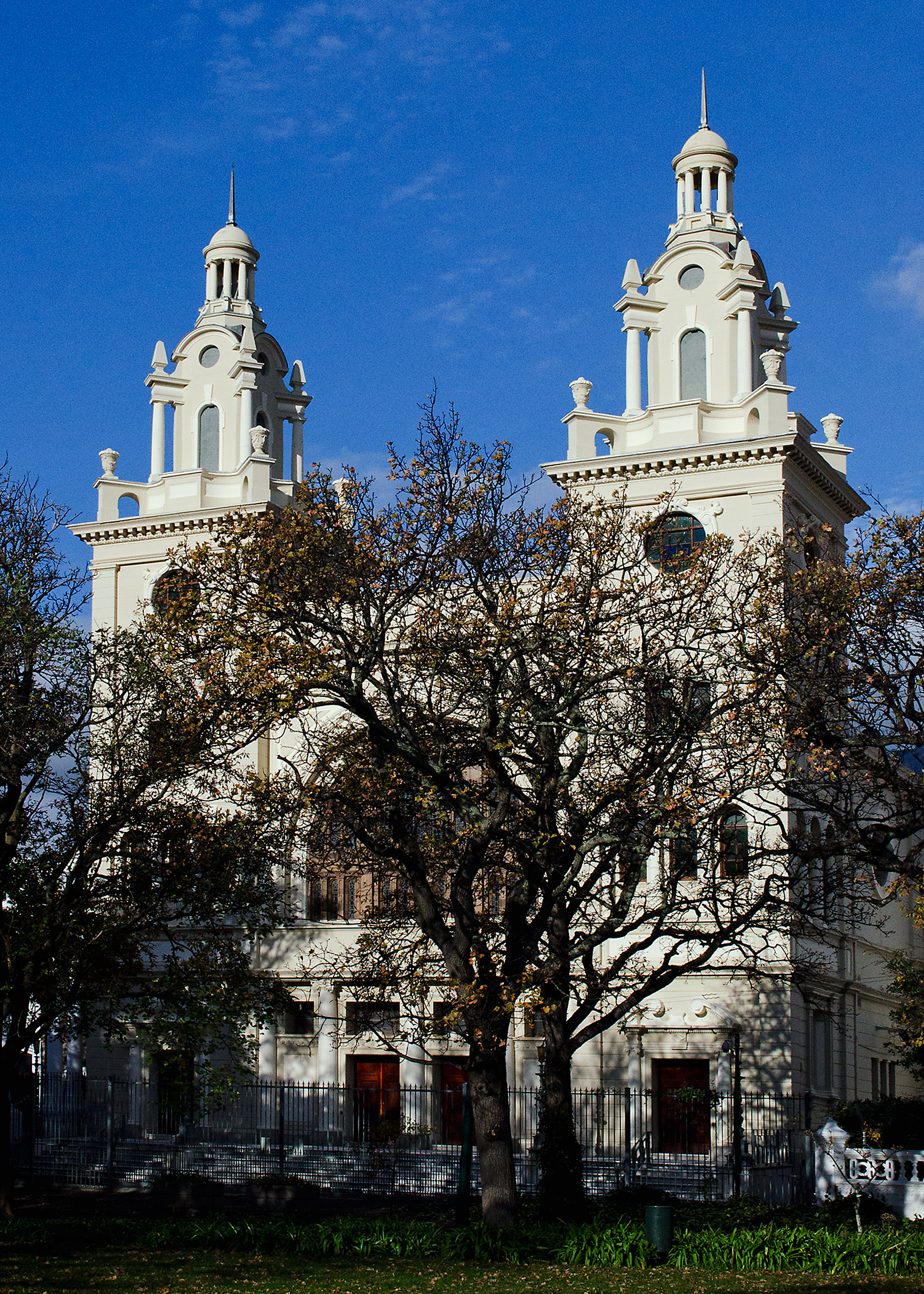
Gardens Shul

- Gardens Shul, an Orthodox Jewish synagogue located in the historic Company Gardens
- St. Barnabas Church, Anglican church on Kloof Nek Road & Kamp Street
- Cape Peninsula Reformed Church, English-speaking congregation of the Dutch Reformed Church in South Africa (NGK) on Kloof Street
- Gereformeerde Kerk Kaapstad, Reformed church on Hof St
- The Union Chapel, Presbyterian church on corner of Kloof Street & Eaton Road
- Father's House Church, Assemblies of God church on Vrede Street
- Jubilee Community Church, located on Kloof Street
- New Life City Church Cape Town, Evangelical church on Kloof Street

== Education ==
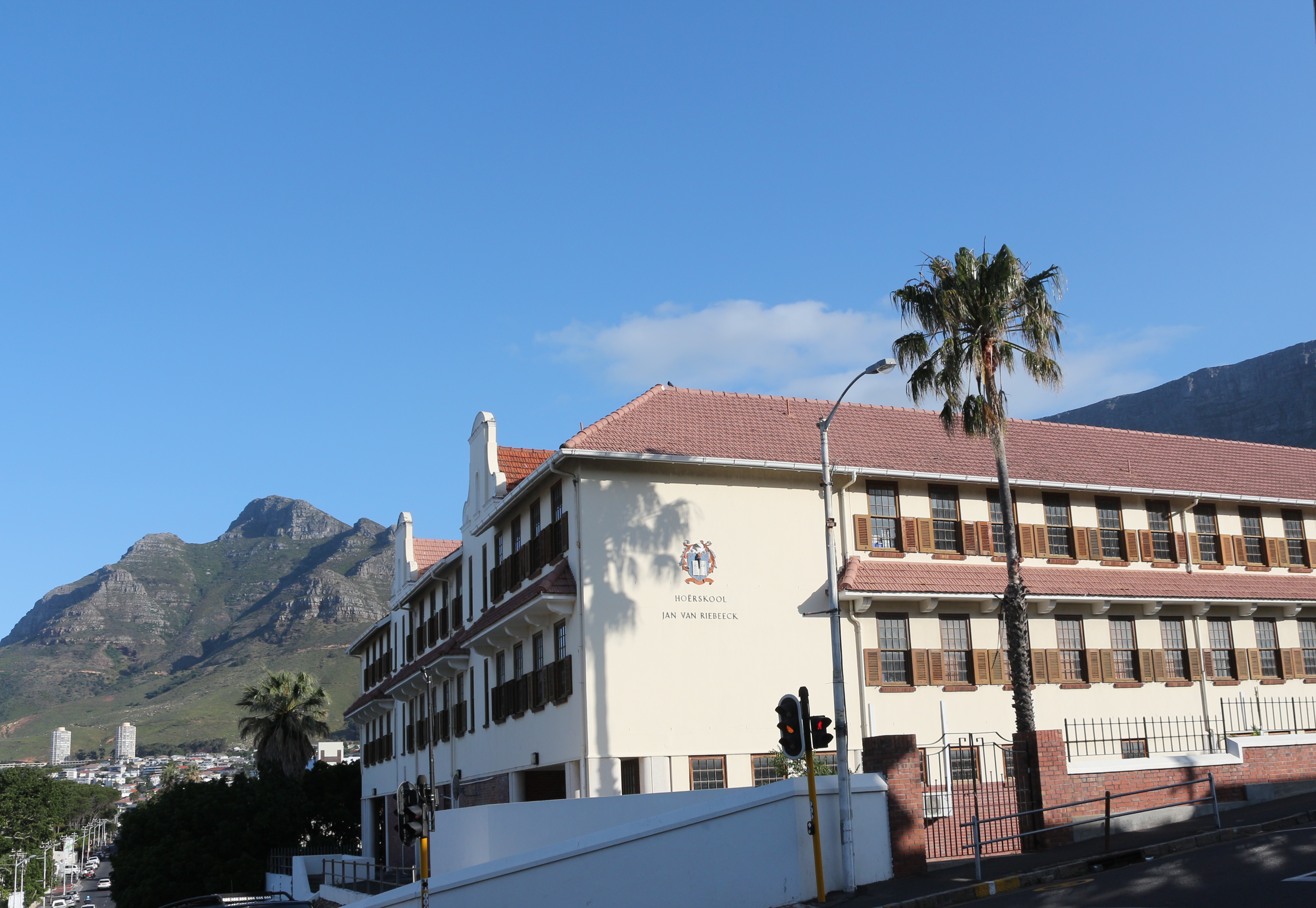
Hoërskool Jan van Riebeeck, Cape Town

=== Schools ===
==== Public ====
- Cape Town High School, an English medium co-educational high school
- Good Hope Seminary High School, an English medium all-girls high school founded in 1873 by Reverend Andrew Murray
- Gardens Commercial High School, an English-medium co-educational high school
- St Mary's Primary School, an English medium co-educational Catholic primary school
- Hoërskool Jan van Riebeeck, an Afrikaans medium high school
- Jan Van Riebeeck Primary School, an Afrikaans medium primary school

==== Private ====
- Lycée Français du Cap, the secondary division of the Cape Town French School, is located in Gardens.
- St. Cyprian's School, an all-girls Anglican pre-primary, primary and high school in neighbourhing Oranjezicht

=== Higher education ===
- Michaelis School of Fine Art, Fine Arts department of the University of Cape Town, founded in 1925 and named after its benefactor, Max Michaelis
- CityVarsity, a school of media and creative arts on Roeland St.

=== Libraries ===
- Kloof Street Public Library, at 122B Kloof Street
- Jacob Gitlin Library, a Jewish library and archive of information on Judaism, Jewish culture and history, and the nation of Israel

== Transportation ==
The suburb is served by the MyCiTi bus rapid transit system. The 101 route takes passengers to Vredehoek and the Cape Town Civic Centre in central Cape Town. The 113 route takes passengers to Adderley Street and the V&A Waterfront. The 107 route goes to Camps Bay.

== Notable people ==
- Hyman Liberman, produce merchant, philanthropist, politician and mayor of Cape Town lived in Gardens.

== In popular culture ==
- Age of Iron, a 1990 novel by J. M. Coetzee takes places in and around the suburb. The elderly white protagonist, Mrs. Curren lives in a home situated in the area of Breda Street, Schoonder Street and Vrede Street.
- Mabu Viny, a record store, previously on 2 Rheede St, features prominently in the documentary, Searching for Sugar Man
