= Belmond Mount Nelson Hotel =

Luxury hotel at the centre of Cape Town in a garden estate

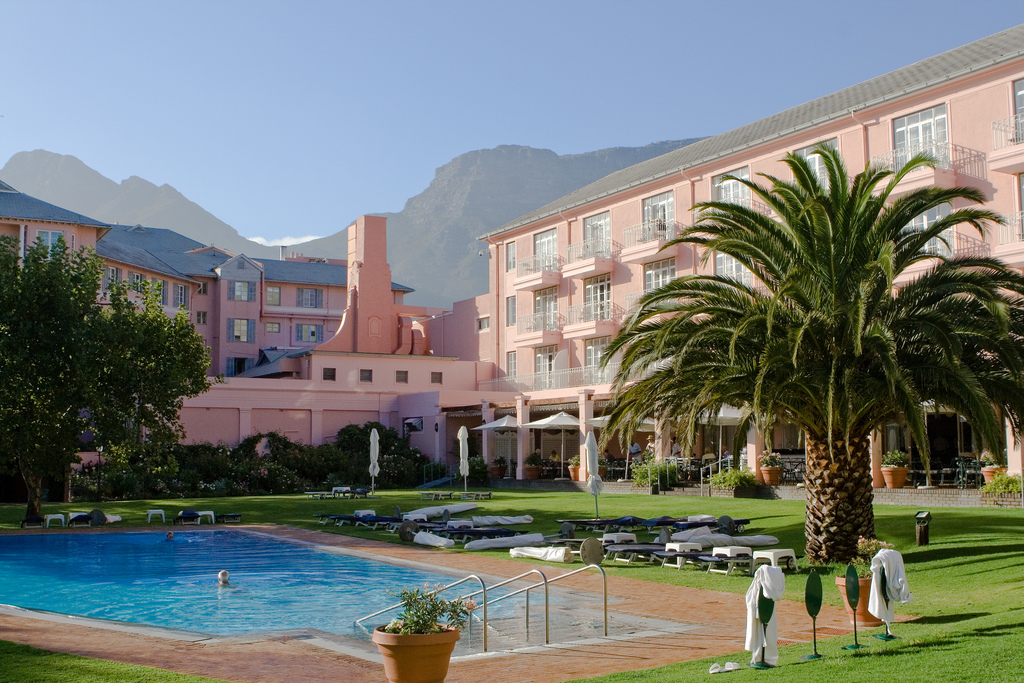

General information
- Location: 76 Orange Street, Cape Town, South Africa
- Coordinates: 33.93209237065384°S 18.411665556762298°E
- Opening: 1899; 127 years ago
- Operator: Belmond Ltd.

Other information
- Number of rooms: 198

Website
- www.belmond.com/en/hotels/africa/south-africa/mount-nelson-cape-town

Belmond Mount Nelson Hotel is a luxury hotel situated in the Gardens neighbourhood of the city of Cape Town, South Africa. The hotel is located in a garden estate, overlooked by Table Mountain.

== Chronology ==
- 1743: The land on which Mount Nelson Hotel is now situated was granted to Baron Pieter van Reede van Oudtshoorn. This land was known as Oudtshoorn Gardens (at this time, the term ‘garden’ was used to describe a small farm). Baron Pieter returned to Holland and while there, was appointed the new governor of the Cape. However, he died en route back to Cape Town, and Oudtshoorn Gardens was subsequently subdivided and sold. (Number 10 Hof Street at the top of Government Avenue contains traces of Baron Pieter’s original home). When people died aboard a ship, they were normally buried at sea, but Baron Pieter van Rheede van Oudtshoorn was kept in a lead-lined coffin and preserved in brandy for four months until his ship reached Cape Town. He was buried with ceremony, and his tombstone can now be seen on the outer wall of Cape Town’s Groote Kerk.
- 1795: Dominee Fleck of Cape Town’s Dutch Reformed Church purchased the main house on the central strip of land upon which Mount Nelson Hotel is now located.
- 1805: Lord Horatio Nelson died at the Battle of Trafalgar.
- 1806: The property was let to an auctioneer - Mr William Maude. On 3 August 1806 the property was advertised in the South African Gazette as Mount Nelson – taking inspiration from Cape Town’s Table Mountain and the fame of Lord Nelson.
- 1843: Sir Hamilton Ross purchased the property. It was to remain within the Ross family for many years during which a large garden was established, complete with deer and fountains. It was known as one of the most magnificent gardens in Cape Town. During this period the low wall in Orange Street (which has since been rebuilt) was used as a convenient resting place for washerwomen on their way to the municipal washhouses below Table Mountain’s Platteklip Gorge. The two lions on the property (near the big old oak tree and opposite the old laundry chimney) as well as some ornamental pot plants and the iron boundary railing on Orange Street are all that remain of the Ross family homestead today.
- 1890: The Mount Nelson property was purchased by shipping magnate Sir Donald Currie, owner of the Union-Castle Shipping Line. He aimed to build a hotel in Cape Town as elegant as those in London, to cater exclusively for the Union-Castle Line’s First Class passengers.
- 1892: The Cape Town municipality assumed responsibility for The Company's Garden – located across Orange Street, in the heart of the city centre - and declared the site open to the public. The Company’s Garden is South Africa’s oldest public garden. It was established by Dutch settlers in 1652. By 1679, the gardens had been transformed through a system of canals and planted with herbs and medicinal plants, fruit and vegetables, oaks, pines and roses. Today the Company’s Garden is a popular site to visit, surrounded by important landmarks such as the Slave Lodge, the Houses of Parliament, the South African National Gallery, the Great Synagogue, the Cape Town Holocaust Centre, St. George's Cathedral, Cape Town, the Iziko South African Museum and the Planetarium.

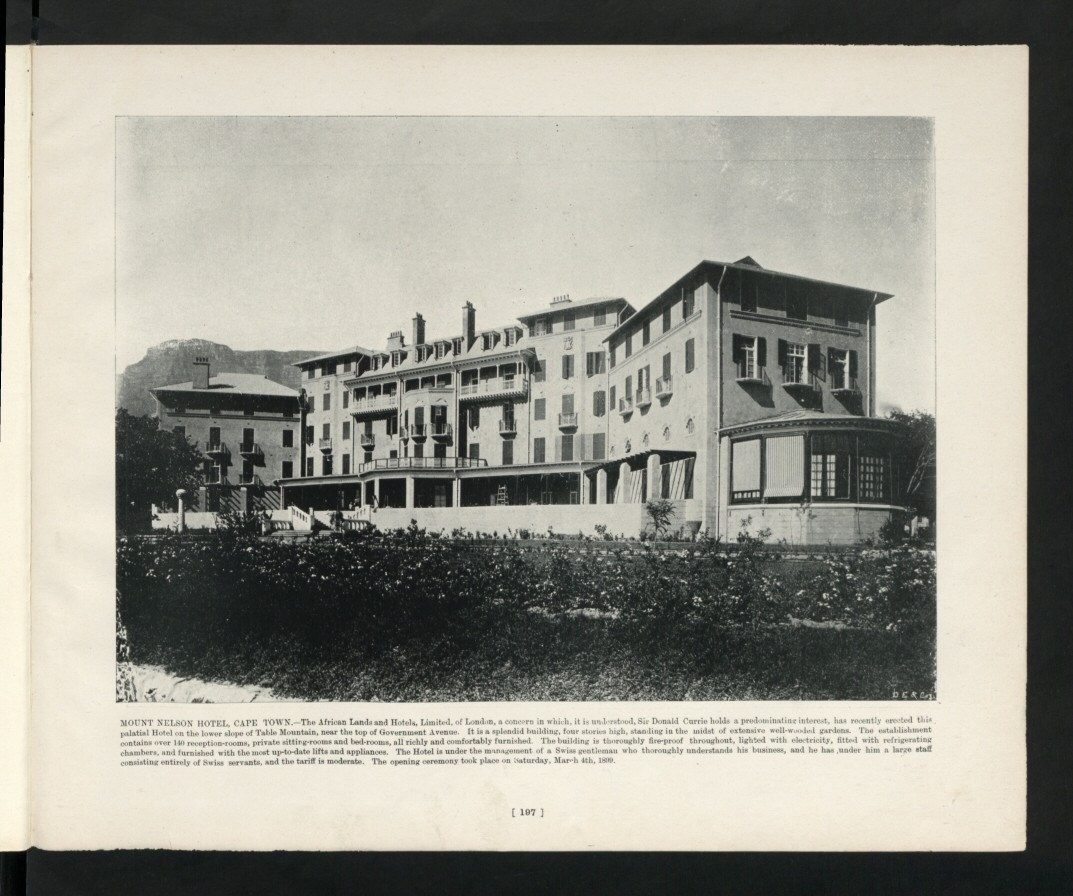

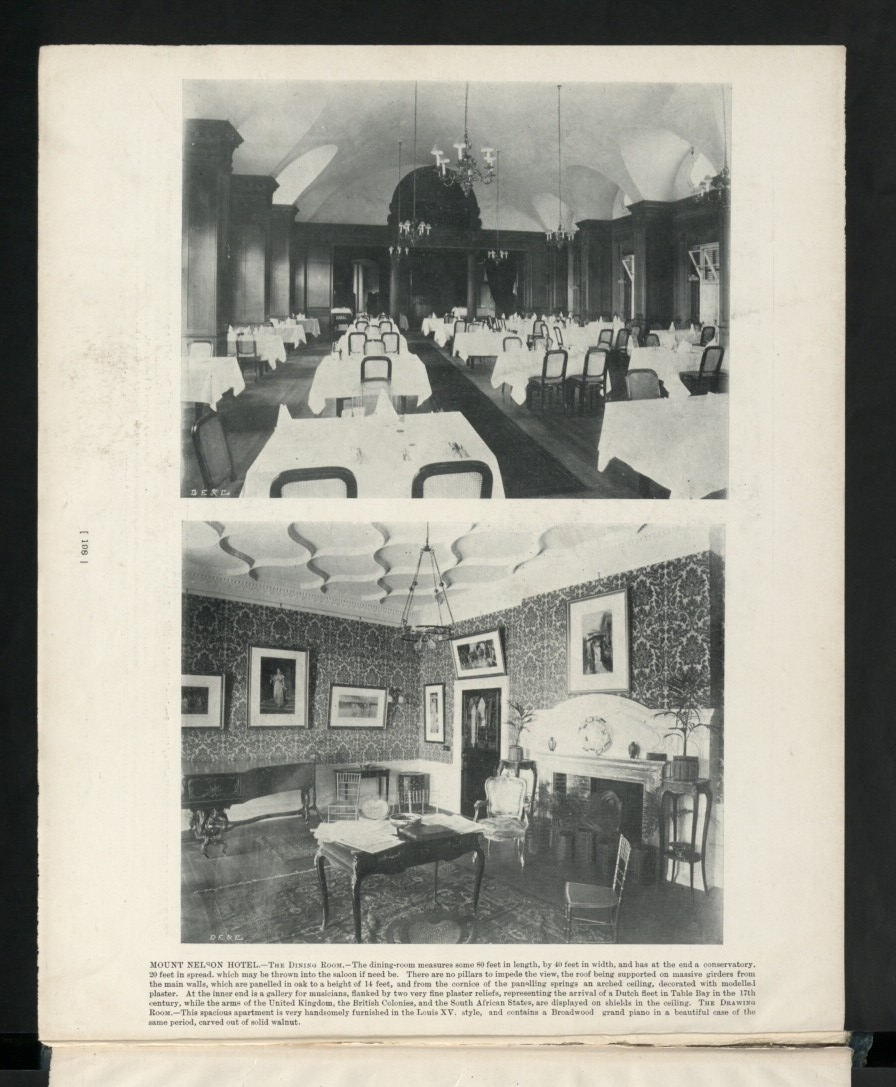

- 1899: Mount Nelson Hotel opened on 6 March. The first hotel in South Africa to offer hot and cold running water, it was described as being ‘even better than its London counterparts’. Its first advertisement in the Cape Times newspaper, 3 March 1899 read: “This large and splendid hotel, beautifully situated in the Gardens at the Top of Government Avenue, in the most Airy and Healthy part of Cape Town, offers to Visitors all the comforts of a First-class Hotel at Reasonable Charges”
- 1899: The South African Second Boer War began in October. The British used Mount Nelson Hotel as a headquarters from which to plan their military campaign. Lord Roberts, Kitchener and Redvers Buller stayed at the hotel, and a young war correspondent based at the hotel – Winston Churchill - described the hotel as: “…a most excellent and well appointed establishment which may be thoroughly appreciated after a sea voyage”.
- 1919: Cape Town was ravaged by a deadly influenza virus. The city’s medical doctors designated Mount Nelson Hotel a ‘plague-free zone’.
- 1925: Edward VIII, Prince of Wales, visited the hotel (the ‘Prince of Wales Gate’ and palm-lined driveway was built in honour of this visit). Sir Arthur Conan Doyle (the creator of Sherlock Holmes), stayed at the hotel later that year. The wooden chairs in the Garden Room and the Lord Nelson Room were originally used as deck chairs on the Union-Castle Line ships.
- 1973: The Oasis accommodation wing was added to Mount Nelson Hotel’s main house.
- 1988: Mount Nelson Hotel was purchased by Orient-Express Hotels.
- 1990: A row of eight perfectly restored historic cottages on the hotel grounds were converted into the Garden Cottage Suites.
- 1993: An electrical fire caused extensive damage to the hotel, resulting in it having to be closed for six months.
- 1996: Mount Nelson Hotel acquired three historic buildings adjacent to Palm Avenue, and Helmsley Hotel, and all four buildings were restored and converted into guest accommodation. Taunton House Cottage was originally built as a guesthouse, Green Park was originally a hostel for nursing staff, and Hof Villa was built as a private residence for the hotel manager. The Helmsley was originally the site of the first Jewish service in Cape Town (held in 1841) and thereafter it became the first Hebrew Congregation in South Africa.
- 2003: The hotel opened Planet Bar, Librisa Spa, Planet Restaurant and Oasis bistro.
- 2014: Orient-Express Hotels changed its name to Belmond Ltd. At that time the hotel was renamed Belmond Mount Nelson Hotel.
- 2023: Forbes Travel Guide awarded Belmond Mount Nelson 5 stars, a very high achievement in the Luxury Hotel industry.

== Notable guests ==
- Winston Churchill
- Queen Elizabeth II
- Bobby Kennedy
- Dalai Lama
- Marlène Dietrich
- Pieter Toerien
- Sir Arthur Conan Doyle
- John Lennon
