= Jacob Gitlin Library =

Archive of information on Judaism, Jewish culture and history, and the nation of Israel

Coordinates: 33.92940°S 18.41669°E

- Location: 88 Hatfield Street; Gardens; Cape Town, South Africa
- Type: Library and archive
- Established: 1959; 67 years ago

Other information
- Website: gitlinlibrary.co.za/activeconnect/default.html

The Jacob Gitlin Library in Cape Town, South Africa is an archive of information on Judaism, Jewish culture and history, and the nation of Israel. It was founded under the auspices of the South African Zionist Federation in 1959.

The museum is situated in the downtown neighbourhood of Gardens in Cape Town. It is located in the grounds of Gardens Shul, and is housed in the Gardens Jewish Community Centre, in the same complex as the South African Jewish Museum and the Cape Town Holocaust & Genocide Centre. It is also close to the Iziko South African National Gallery and Houses of Parliament.

== History ==
The library is named after Jacob Gitlin (1880-1953), the “father of Cape Zionism”. Gitlin arrived in South Africa from Lithuania in 1902 and was secretary of the Dorshei Zion Association (DZA) for many years.
