= Hyman Liberman =

South African politician and philanthropist

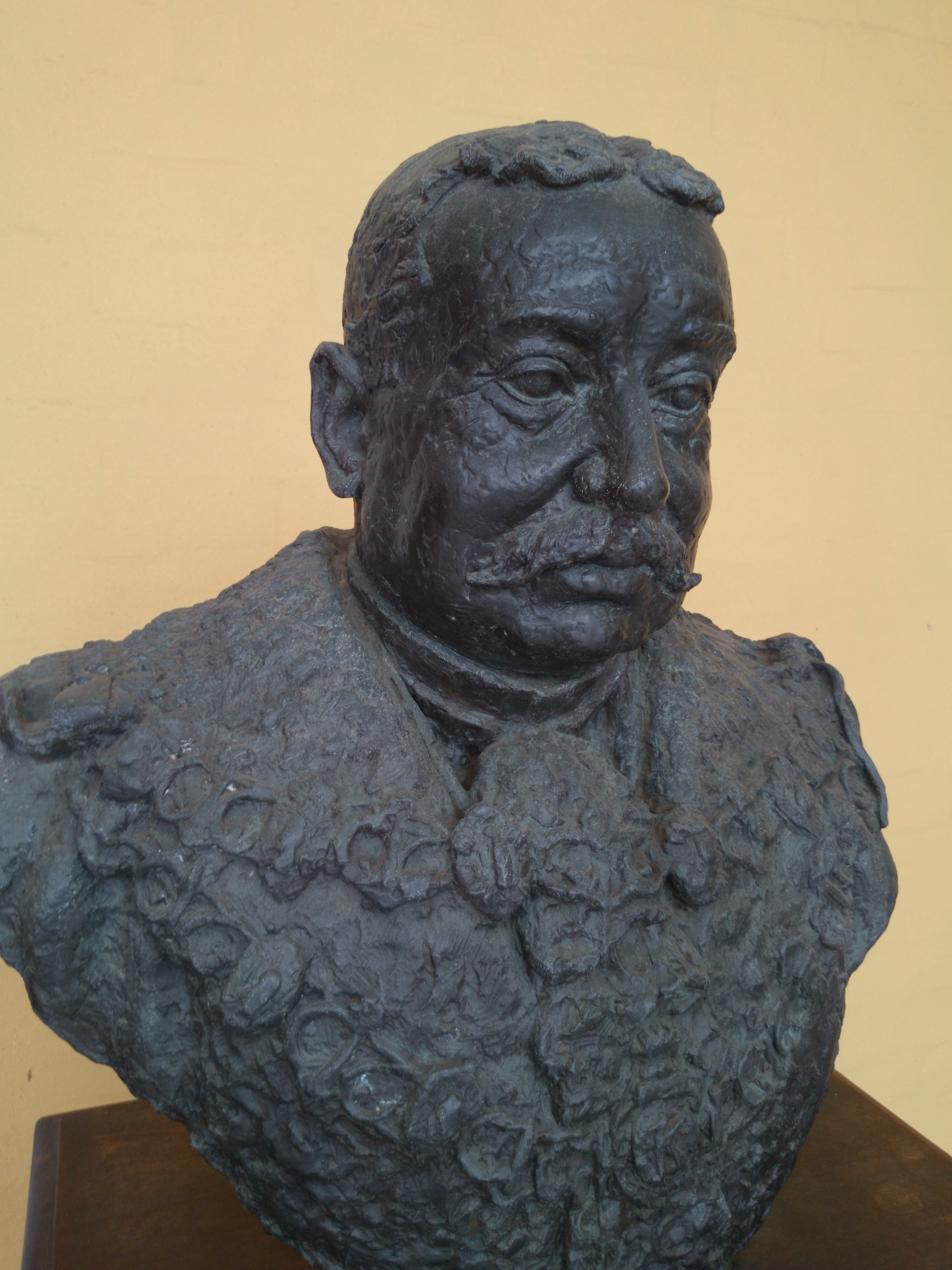
- Bust of Liberman by Moses Kottler

Mayor of Cape Town
- In office 1904–1907
- Preceded by: William Thorne
- Succeeded by: William Duncan Baxter

Personal details
- Born: 1853 Suwałki, Congress Poland
- Died: 23 June 1923 (aged 69–70) Cape Town, South Africa
- Spouse: Esther Liberman
- Occupation: Politician, businessman

Hyman Liberman (1853 - 23 June 1923) was a Polish-born South African politician, produce merchant and philanthropist. He served three consecutive terms as the Mayor of Cape Town between 1904 and 1907. He was the city's first elected Jewish mayor. David Bloomberg, who served as mayor of the city in the 1970s, said that Liberman's appointment was "extraordinary" at the time as much of the Council was made up of gentry from England, Scotland and Ireland. He became the second Jewish person in South Africa to hold mayoral office, after H.H. Solomon in Port Elizabeth in 1875. According to Milton Shain, Liberman may have been the inspiration behind a Jewish caricature cartoon by D. C. Boonzaier.

He was born in Suwałki in Poland and spent much of his childhood in Birmingham, where he served a business apprenticeship, before emigrating to South Africa in 1873 at age 20. He was a senior partner in the produce merchants firm, Liberman & Buirski and became very successful. This allowed him to be an active philanthropist, and he also showed great care and concern for the refugees and unemployed that fled to the Cape during the Second Boer War.

He was congregation president of the Gardens Shul and formally opened the new synagogue in 1905. The facade of the synagogue also contains the Liberman Memorial stained glass windows. As mayor he also opened the newly completed Cape Town City Hall. He was a member of Cape Town City Council from 1900 to 1916.

He died on 23 June 1923 and is buried at the 7th Avenue Jewish cemetery in Maitland.

== Legacy ==
He bequeathed part of his personal fortune to the people of Cape Town to create art. The South African National Gallery was being built at the time and subsequently became home to the "Hyman Liberman Memorial Doors" by H. V. Meyerowitz, depicting aspects of Jewish life in South Africa. The main exhibition was also named after Liberman. In 1934 the Hyman Liberman Institute opened as a community centre and library in District Six. It was based on the model of Toynbee Hall in London and was partnered with the University of Cape Town. It became the centre of "high culture" in the district.

Scholarships were also established in his name at the University of Cape Town from 1927. He also established the Esther Liberman Scholarship at the university in 1918, in the name of his late wife. He also bequeathed money to his synagogue, the Gardens Shul. Liberman's former home, Rosecourt at 25 Breda St in Gardens is now used by Astra, a sheltered employment organisation for Jewish adults.
