= Mendel Kaplan =

Mendel Kaplan may refer to:

- Yisrael Mendel Kaplan (1913–1985), rabbi and teacher
- Mendel Kaplan (philanthropist) (1936–2009), South African Jewish industrialist, philanthropist and community activist
