= South African Jewish Museum =

Museum in Cape Town, South Africa

- Established: December 2000
- Location: 88 Hatfield Street; Gardens; Cape Town
- Coordinates: 33°55′47″S 18°25′01″E
- Founder: Mendel Kaplan
- Director: Gavin Morris
- Website: www.sajewishmuseum.co.za

The South African Jewish Museum is a museum of South African Jewish life, history and identity. The museum is situated in the downtown neighbourhood of Gardens in Cape Town. It is located in the grounds of Gardens Shul, and is in the same complex as the Cape Town Holocaust & Genocide Centre and the Gardens Jewish Community Centre (which houses the Jacob Gitlin Library). It is also close to the Iziko South African National Gallery and Houses of Parliament. The museum was founded by the late philanthropist, Mendel Kaplan. It documents the community's historical roots in Lithuania and elsewhere. Thereon it documents the role of South African Jewry in South African society and their contributions to a number of diverse fields.

== History ==
In 1996, philanthropist Mendel Kaplan made the decision to establish a national museum about the South African Jewish community, funding the project through the Kaplan Kushlick Foundation. The foundation commissioned a new purpose-built museum building, while repurposing the original Old Shul (the oldest synagogue in Southern Africa) as the museum's entrance. Since 1958, the Old Shul housed a smaller Jewish museum. The new museum was opened by President Nelson Mandela in 2000, and he was accompanied by Helen Suzman and Mendel Kaplan. The Old Shul was the recipient of a grant from US State Department’s Ambassadorial Fund for Cultural Preservation for its renovation. It reopened in 2023, in a ceremony attended by Reuben Brigety, United States ambassador to South Africa.

== Exhibitions ==
Permanent exhibitions include a reconstruction of a Lithuanian shtetl, showing the life and conditions of the Jewish migrants before their arrival in South Africa.

In 2010, the museum staged an exhibition about Muizenberg, a beach town in the Western Cape that was once a premier travel destination among South African Jews as well as home to a synagogue and 600 Jewish families The exhibition, ″Jiving with Madiba″ by cartoonist, Zapiro opened in 2011. A 2012 exhibition, ″The Jews of District Six: Another Time, Another Place″ focused on the Jewish resident population in District Six before its destruction. In 2015, the museum showcased the exhibition ″Helen Suzman: Fighter for Human Rights″, chronicling her anti-apartheid activism. In 2020, the museum opened an exhibition, ″Ground Breakers: A History of Progressive Judaism in South Africa″ about the history and role of Progressive Judaism (Reform) in the country. In 2021 a new exhibition opened, ″The Life of Ali Bacher: From the Cricket Field″, charting the life of the Jewish cricketer, Ali Bacher from Johannesburg.

== Gallery ==
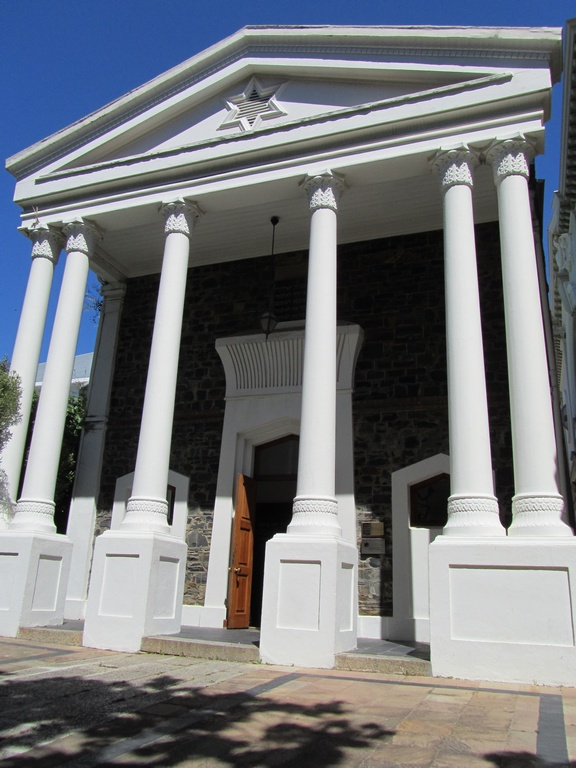
The Old Shul, entrance to the SAJM

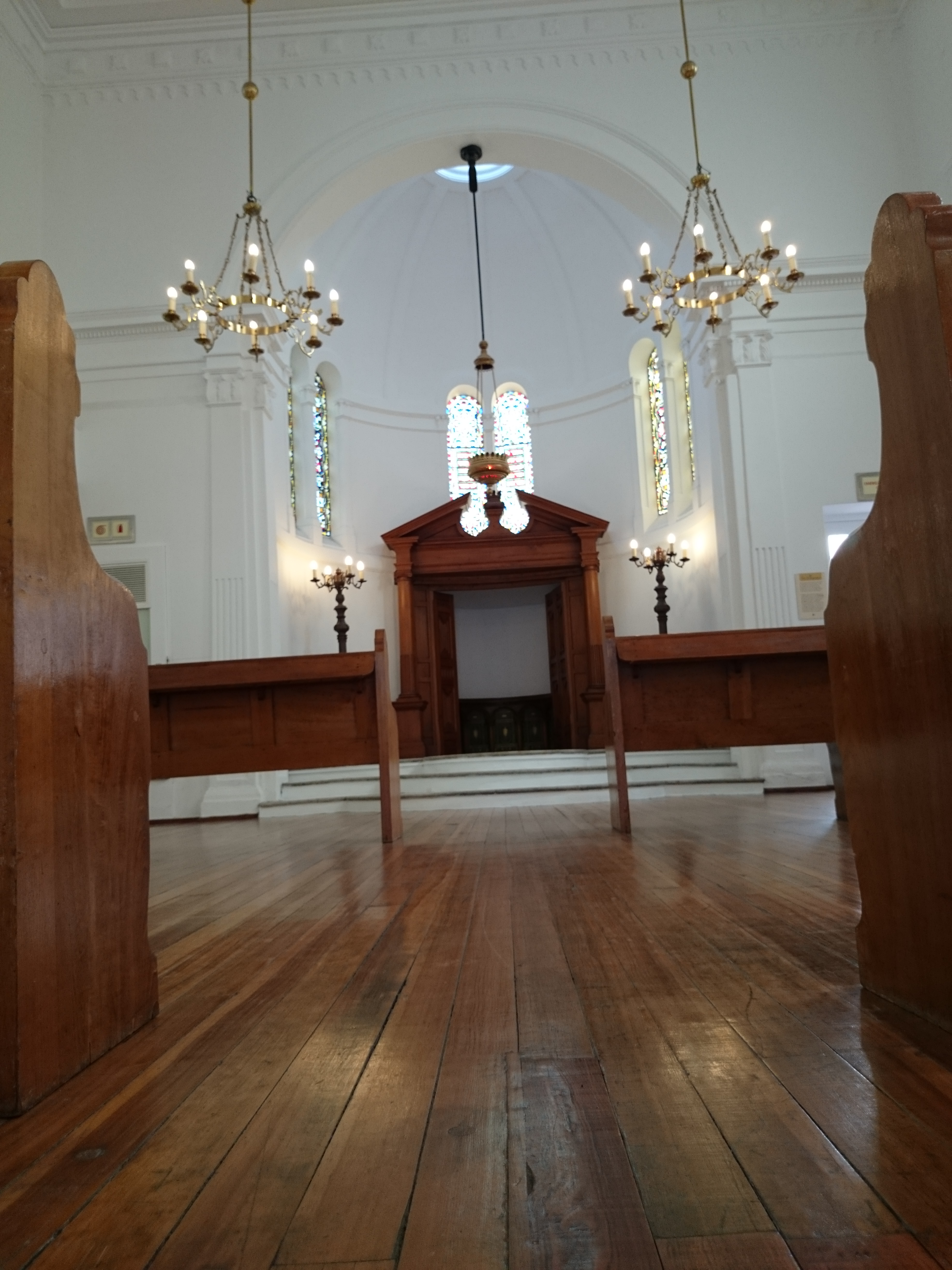
Interior of the Old Shul

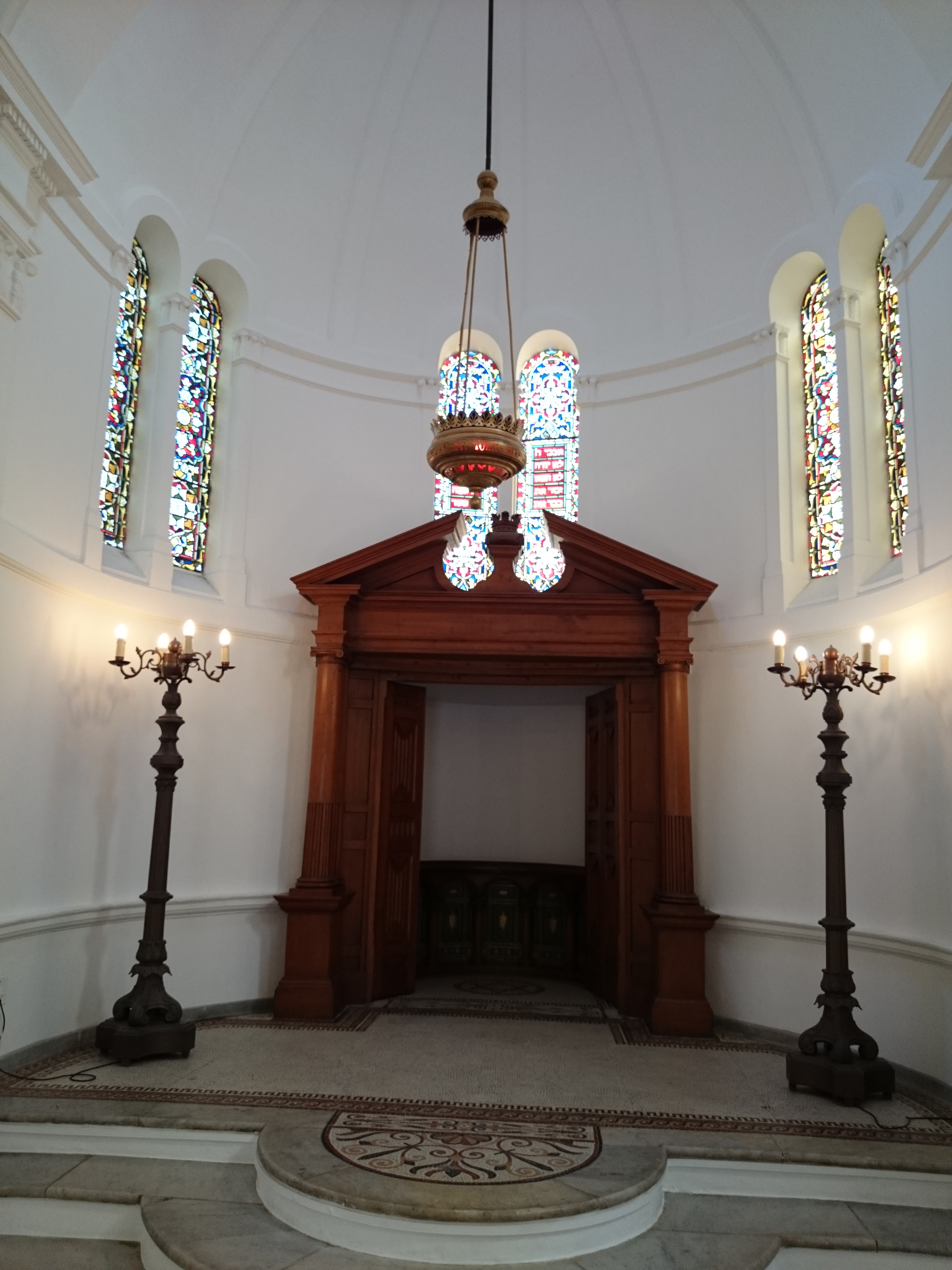
Interior of the Old Shul

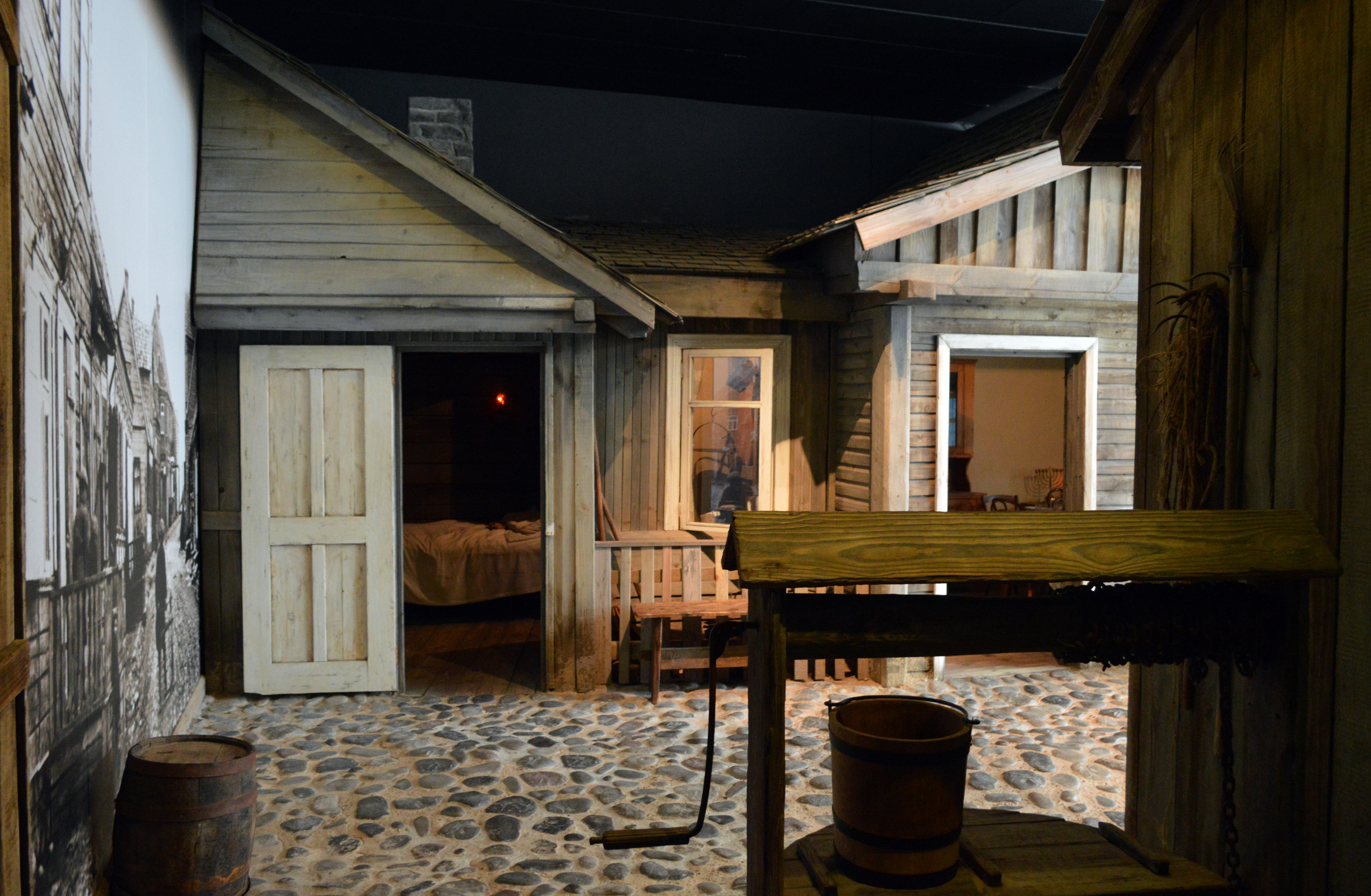
Reconstruction of a traditional Jewish shtetl in Lithuania

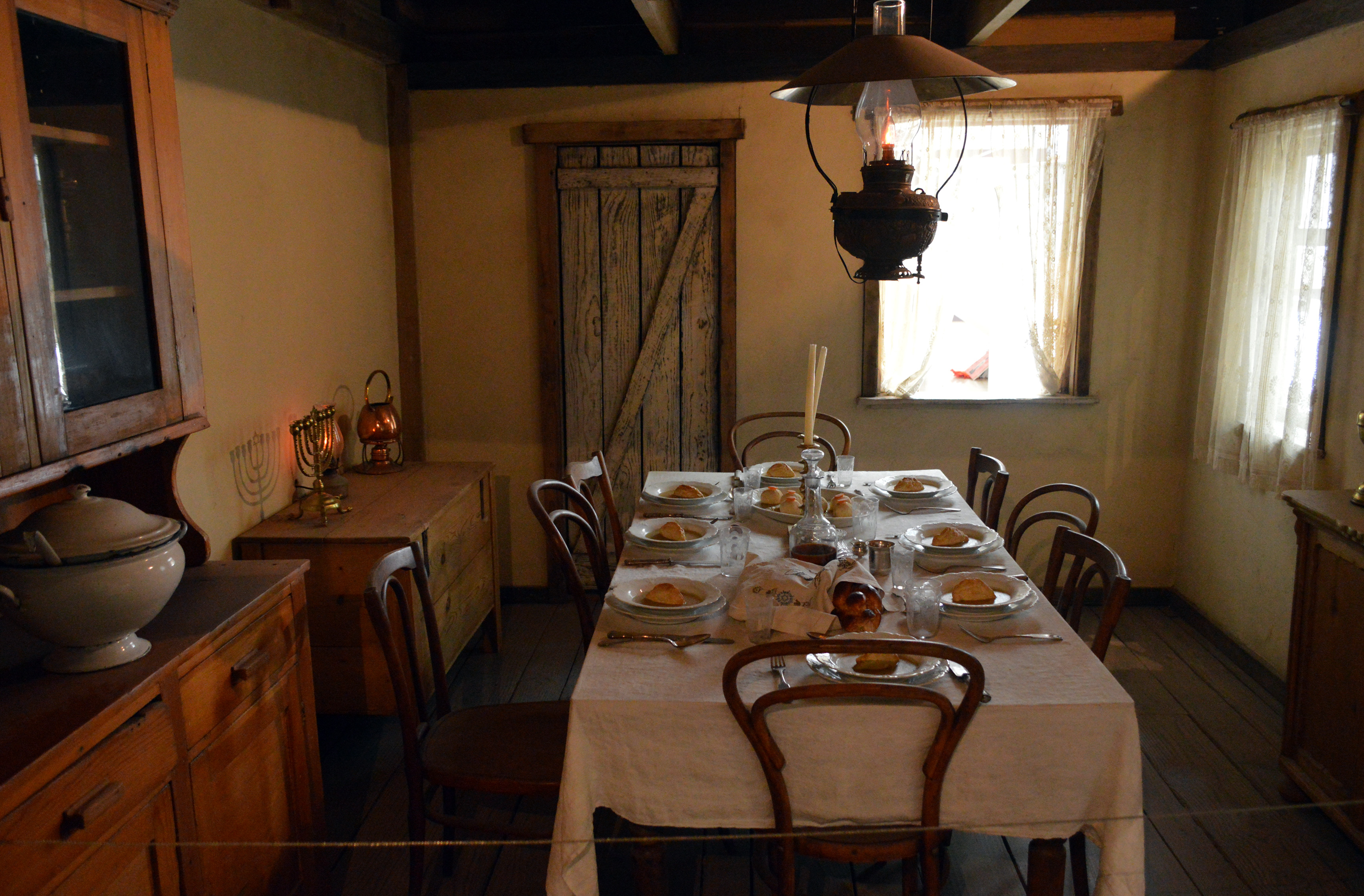
Interior of a wooden dwelling in a traditional Lithuanian shtetl

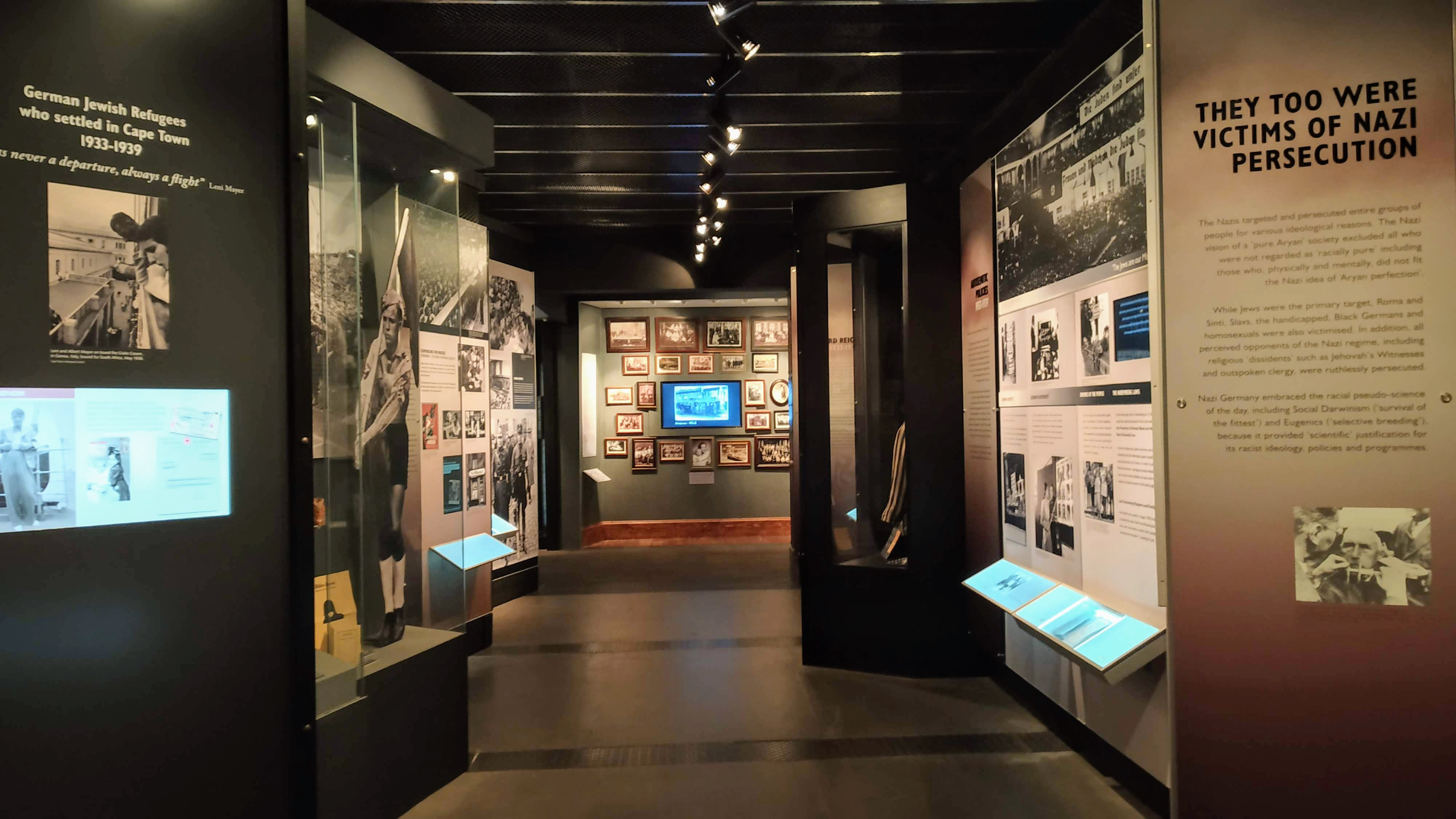
Permanent exhibition

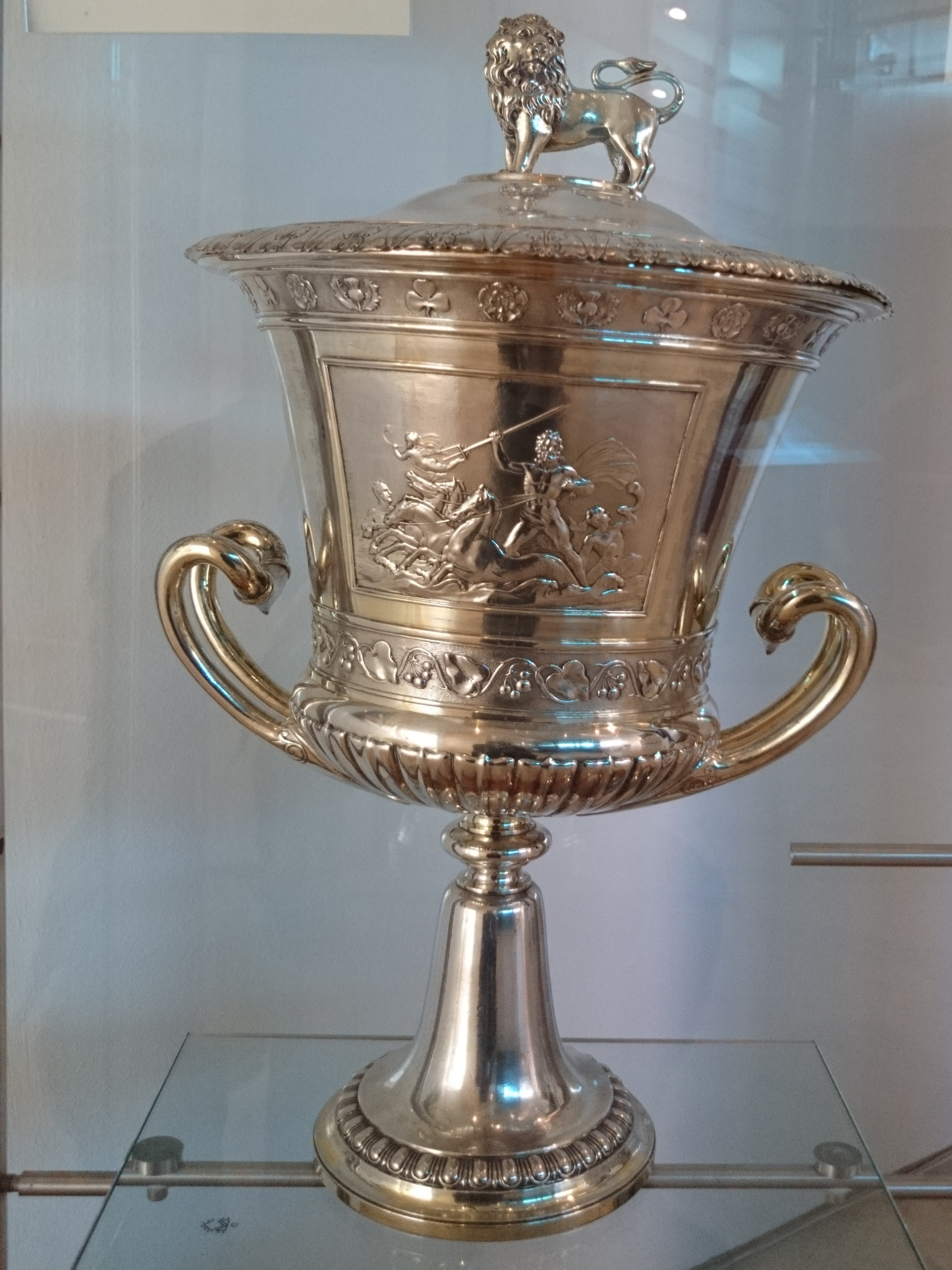
The Norden Cup, presented to Benjamin Norden, leading founder of the first Jewish congregation in South Africa, when he returned to England in 1858

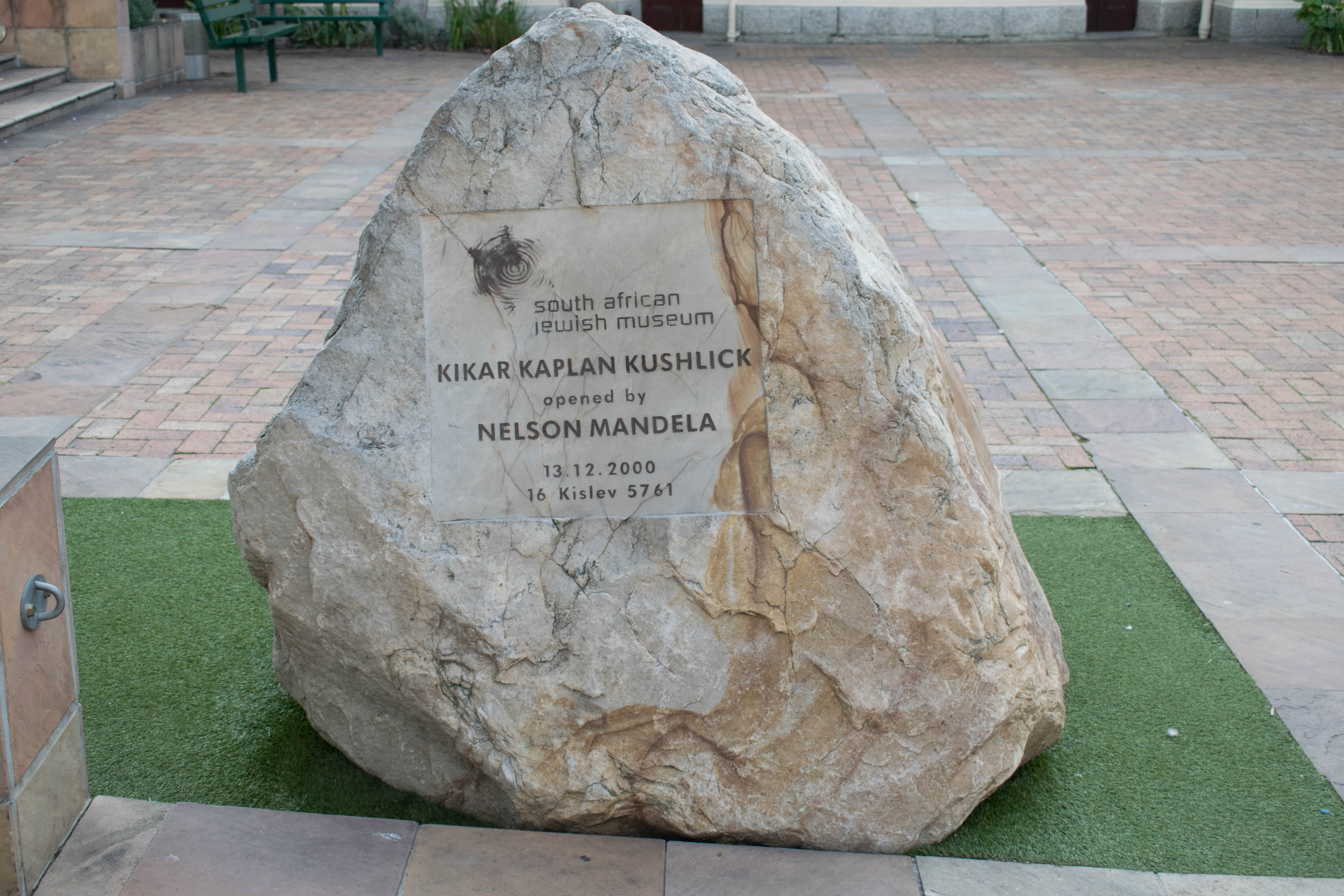
Opening stone

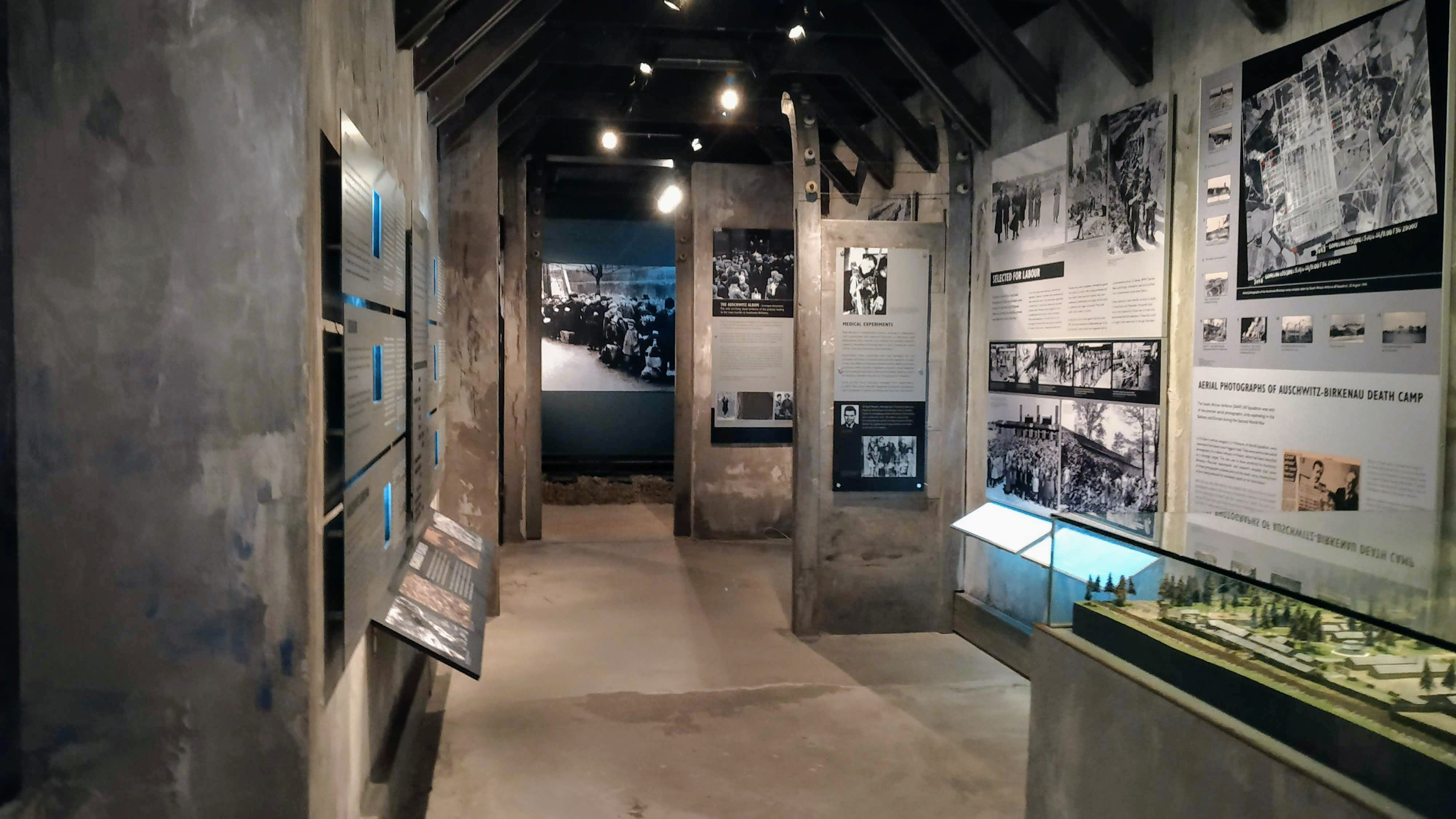
Exhibition at the SAJM

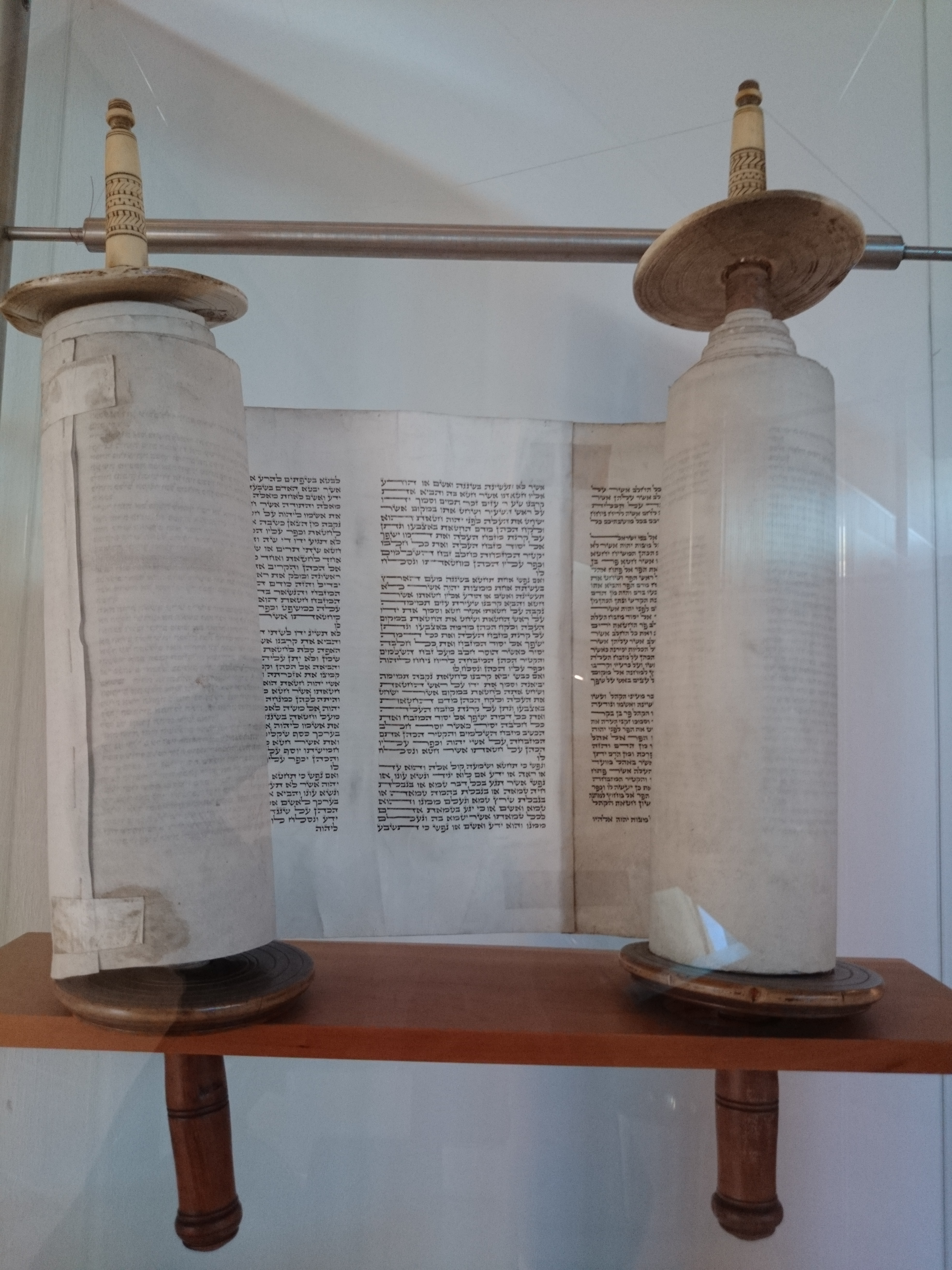
The first Torah Scroll, brought to South Africa by Aaron de Pass
