= Kaplan Centre =

South African research institute

Coordinates: 33°57′36″S 18°27′34″E

Isaac and Jessie Kaplan Centre for Jewish Studies and Research
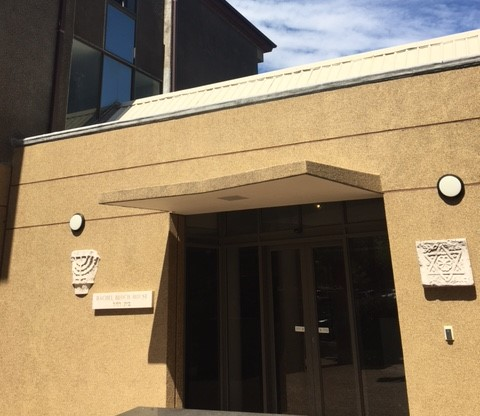
- Rachel Bloch House - Isaac and Jessie Kaplan Centre
- Formation: 1980; 46 years ago
- Founder: Mendel Kaplan
- Headquarters: University of Cape Town, Madiba Cir, Rondebosch, Cape Town
- Director: Adam Mendelsohn
- Key people: Moshe Davis, Milton Shain
- Website: Kaplan Centre

The Isaac and Jessie Kaplan Centre for Jewish Studies and Research is an institute located in Cape Town, South Africa dedicated to Jewish studies. It is an autonomous centre with its own governing body and located within the Department of Hebrew and Jewish Studies at the University of Cape Town. The centre is the only one of its kind in South Africa. It seeks to promote the learning of Jewish studies and research at the university and has a special focus on the South African Jewish community. As well as producing a new generation of scholars, the centre trains teachers for the Jewish Day School system.

== History ==
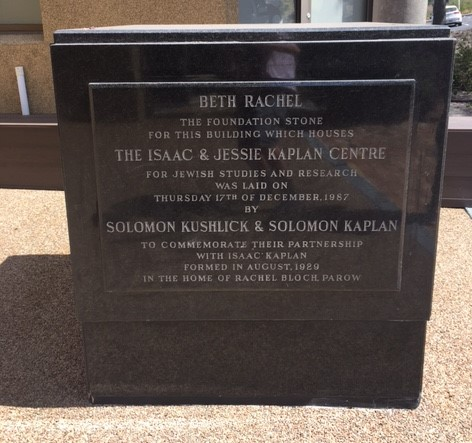
Corner stone of the Isaac and Jessie Kaplan Centre at UCT

It was established in 1980 under the terms of a gift to the University of Cape Town by the Kaplan Kushlick Foundation and in honour of the parents of Mendel Kaplan and his brother, Robert.

== Jewish Digital Archive Project ==
Beginning 2011, the Jewish Digital Archive collects photography, film and oral history interviews for their archives for educational purposes such as academic research as well as for public genealogical interest. The photograph and film collections trace the history of Jewish people in Southern Africa. Many of these people came from places such as Zimbabwe, Potchefstroom, Cuba and Lithuania.

== See also ==
- History of the Jews in South Africa
