= Labia Theatre =

Cinema in Cape Town, South Africa

Coordinates: 33°55′48″S 18°24′45″E

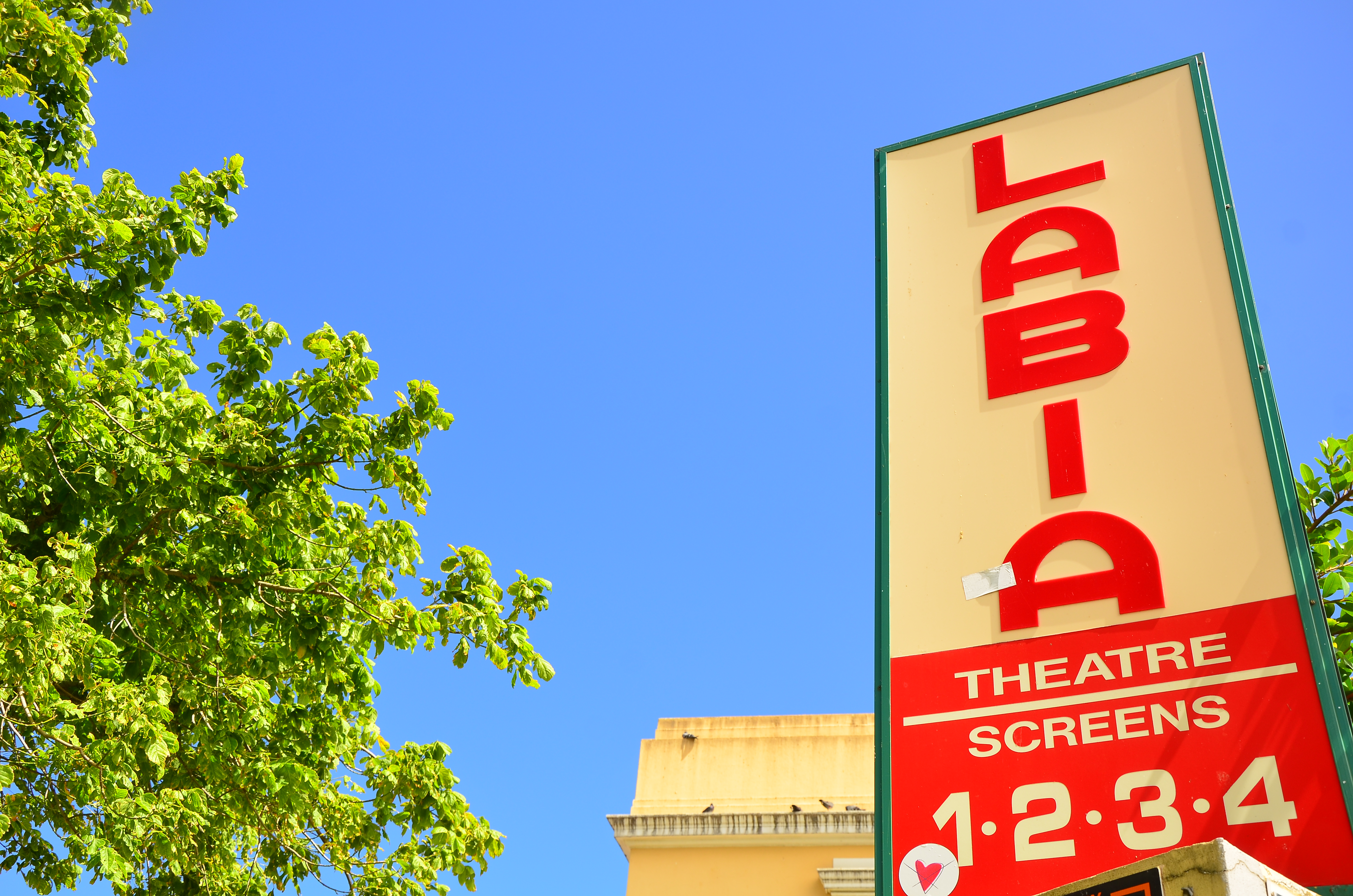
- Interactive map of Labia Theatre
- Address: 68 Orange Street, Gardens, Cape Town, South Africa
- Owner: Ludi Kraus
- Type: Movie theatre

Construction
- Opened: 16 May 1949

Website
- www.thelabia.co.za

The Labia Theatre is one of the oldest independent movie theatres in Cape Town, South Africa. It is situated in Gardens, an inner-city suburb in the City Bowl.

== History ==
The original building was an Italian Embassy ballroom opened by Princess Labia on 16 May 1949 as a theatre for the staging of live performance arts. Renowned playwrights such as Robert Kirby staged productions at the theatre. A consortium consisting of the public broadcaster, the SABC and the Department of Sea Fisheries owned the theatre. Films were screened during the periods when no live performances were presented.

From the early 1970s, the cinema was owned by Polish emigrant, Wolf Miknowski. It was facing significant challenges to its survival with the opening of the Nico Malan Theatre (now the Artscape Theatre Centre) in the CBD. Miknowski allowed Eric Liknaitzky to rent the theatre to screen independent arthouse films. Liknaitzky, Trevor Taylor and Tony Velks were among the chief distributors.Apartheid legislation such as the Reservation of Separate Amenities Act, 1953 was largely ignored. Mario Veo and Ingrid Burnett then owned the cinema from 1979 to 1989.

The actor, Richard E. Grant was studying nearby at the University of Cape Town and he was a frequent patron of the cinema. For Grant it acted as a "second university", providing him an opening into the world of cinema.

Ludi Kraus has owned the cinema since September 1989. Kraus had previously imported foreign-language films from Europe and arranged their screenings at the Baxter Theatre Centre and the Nico Malan Theatre Centre. Kraus left behind his legal career to concentrate on running the Labia full-time. It has continued to mainly screen cult, classic and art movies, but included more commercial fare too. Much of the original features of the old building have been maintained, such as the ticket booth, sweets counter, and even the seats.

Changes to the theatre, since its inception, have included three more cinemas, a bar and food area, and a terrace. For several years, there was an annex location with two modern screens in the Lifestyle Centre at 50 Kloof Street, but this location was closed in 2013.

== Crowdfunding ==
In July 2014, the Labia Theatre started a crowdfunding campaign called "Digital Gold." This initiative was to raise funds for digital projectors, new facilities, and an upgraded foyer. The initiative was sufficiently successful, with 885 individuals raising over R550,000. Although well short of the R2,000,000 target needed, the campaign helped rejuvenate the Labia Theatre with digital projectors in all of its cinemas.

== Controversy ==
In February 2012, the Palestine Solidarity Campaign (PSC) threatened to boycott the theatre and lodge a complaint with the Human Rights Commission (HRC) after it refused to screen the documentary Roadmap to Apartheid, which draws parallels between South African apartheid and the Israeli–Palestinian conflict, due to its politically controversial nature and what appeared to the theatre's owner to be one-sidedness; the PSC alleged, however, that this was due to local Zionist lobbying, and Right2Know, who were hosting the free screening in association with the Labia and the PSC, accused the Labia of "succumb[ing] to pressure from the Zionist Federation".
