= Gardens Commercial High School =

- Gardens Commercial High School crest

Location
- Paddock Avenue, Gardens; Cape Town, Western Cape; South Africa
- Coordinates: 33°55′49″S 18°24′56″E

Information
- Type: Public school
- Motto: Floreat - Flourish
- Established: 1961; 65 years ago
- School district: District 9
- School number: 021 465 1236
- Principal: Mr Dylan Tommy
- Grades: 8–12
- Gender: Boys & Girls
- Age: 14 to 19
- Enrollment: 590 pupils
- Language: English
- Schedule: 07:30 - 15:00
- Campus: Urban Campus
- Campus type: Suburban
- Colours: Blue; Gold; White
- Nickname: The Smurfs
- Rival: Cape Town High School; Sea Point High School
- Accreditation: Western Cape Education Department
- Website: www.gardenshigh.co.za

Gardens Commercial High School is a public English medium co-educational inner city secondary school situated in Cape Town in the Western Cape province of South Africa with learners aged 12–18 years. In 2006 the school was designated a Business, Commerce and Management (BCM) Focus School. As such, Gardens Commercial is part of an education intervention that aims to redress the Apartheid education system. Gardens Commercial offers the following focus field subjects: Accounting, Business Studies, Economics and Computer Applications Technology.

== History ==
Gardens Commercial High School is a mixture of the old and the new. The five original houses which still form parts of the school buildings were built in 1882 and were used as University of Cape Town residences during the 1920s. Since then they have housed a private hotel, the offices of the Provincial Administration (1939–1944) and the offices of the Department of Inland Revenue and the Rent Control Board (1944–1967).

In 1967 the demolition of Avenue Terrace - as the buildings were then known – was planned. In its stead a new school would be built to house the pupils from the Day School of Commerce (est. 1961) which, until then, had been a department of the Cape Technical College. These plans, however, were shelved and the original buildings were adapted for use as a school.

In 1968 the school came under the jurisdiction of the Cape Education Department and a year later it was renamed Gardens Commercial High School. The Avenue Terrace buildings survived intact, a second time, when demolition plans were again mooted.

When Louis Karol Architects were commissioned in 1976 to build the new school, their decision to incorporate Avenue Terrace finally guaranteed the survival of these buildings.

In 1984 - two years before the school's silver anniversary - the Twistniet Sports Complex was opened in Upper Orange Street. It offered facilities for hockey, tennis, basketball, netball and athletics.

In 1993 the old School buildings, the wall and the ground were declared a National Monument. The original deeds of transfer of the ground, are part of the Uitvlugt, date to 1732.

== Sport & Culture ==
Learners participate in at least one extramural activity throughout the year. The following activities are offered:

- Argus Quizz
- Athletics
- Beauty Therapy
- Book Club
- Bowls
- Chess
- Dancing
- Drama
- E-gaming
- Fitness Club
- Interact
- Inter-Faith
- Journaling
- Netball
- Soccer
- Touch Rugby
- Website committee
- Volleyball
