= Milton Shain =

South African academic (born 1949)

- Born: 1949 (age 76–77)
- Occupations: Professor, academic
- Known for: History of South African Jews and history of antisemitism

Academic background
- Education: University of Cape Town

Academic work
- Discipline: History
- Institutions: University of Cape Town

Milton Shain (born 1949) is a South African historian. He specialises in South African Jewish history and the history of antisemitism. He was Director of the Isaac and Jessie Kaplan Centre for Jewish Studies and Research at the University of Cape Town until his retirement at the end of 2014. He sits on the advisory board of the Cape Town Holocaust Centre and in 2014 he was elected a Fellow of the Royal Society of South Africa.

== Publications ==
As author

- Jewry and Cape Society: The Origins and Activities of the Jewish Board of Deputies for the Cape Colony (1983, ISBN 062006529X)
- The Roots of Antisemitism in South Africa (1994, ISBN 0813914884)
- Antisemitism (1998, ISBN 0906097258)
- Looking Back: Jews in the Struggle for Democracy and Human Rights in South Africa (2001, ISBN 0799220442)
- The Jews in South Africa: An Illustrated History (2008, ISBN 186842281X)
- A Perfect Storm (Antisemitism in South Africa 1930 - 1948) (2015, ISBN 1868427005)
- Fascists, Fabricators and Fantasists: Anti-Semitism in South Africa from 1948 to the Present (2023, ISBN 1431433586)

As editor

- Jewries at the Frontier: Accommodation, Identity, Conflict (1999, ISBN 0252067924)
- Opposing voices: Liberalism and opposition in South Africa today (2006, ISBN 1868422453)
- Place and Displacement in Jewish History and Memory: Zakor V'Makor (2009, ISBN 0853039402)
- Holocaust Scholarship: Personal Trajectories and Professional Interpretations (2015, ISBN 1137514183)
