= Cape Town High School =

English medium secondary school in central Cape Town

Coordinates: 33.93183°S 18.41498°E

Location
- 96 Hatfield Street, Gardens; Cape Town, Western Cape; South Africa

Information
- School type: Public
- Motto: Videat Dominus
- Established: 1860; 166 years ago
- School district: District 9
- School number: 021 424 2168
- Headmaster: Mr Emilton Cloete
- Grades: 8–12
- Gender: Boys & Girls
- Age: 14 to 18
- Enrollment: 649 pupils
- Language: English
- Schedule: 07:30 - 14:00
- Campus: Urban Campus
- Campus type: Suburban
- Colours: Grey; Green; White
- Rival: Gardens Commercial High School; Sea Point High School
- Accreditation: Western Cape Education Department

Cape Town High School is a public English medium co-educational high school in the inner city of Cape Town in Cape Town in the Western Cape province of South Africa It is located in the inner city and it is open for both girls and boys. It is an English medium school and specifically a science school.

After the school's library closed down due to the COVID-19 pandemic, it was opened anew in 2024.
