= Gardens Shul =

Modern Orthodox synagogue in Cape Town, South Africa

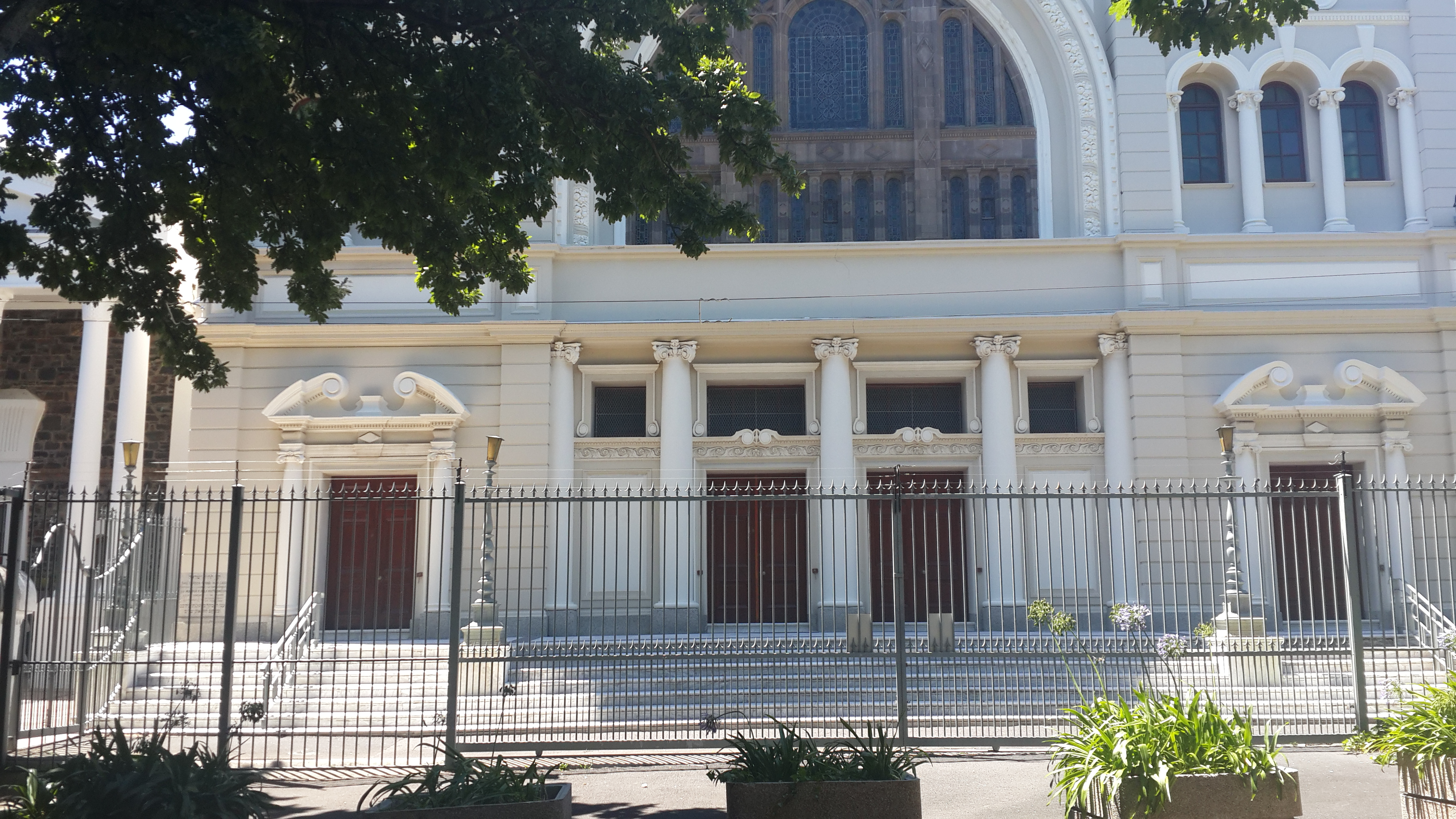
- Entrance to the synagogue in 2014

- Location of the synagogue in Central Cape Town

Religion
- Affiliation: Modern Orthodox Judaism
- Rite: Nusach Ashkenaz
- Ecclesiastical or organizational status: Synagogue
- Ownership: Cape Town Hebrew Congregation
- Leadership: Rabbi Osher Feldman
- Status: Active

Location
- Location: 88 Hatfield Street, Gardens, Central Cape Town
- Country: South Africa
- Interactive map of Gardens Shul
- Coordinates: 33°55′47″S 18°25′00″E

Architecture
- Architects: John Parker; Alexander Forsythe
- Type: Synagogue architecture
- Established: 1841 (as a congregation)
- Completed: 1863 (Old Shul); 1905 (current synagogue)

Specifications
- Capacity: 1,500 worshippers
- Dome: One

Website
- gardensshul.co.za

The Gardens Shul, formally the Cape Town Hebrew Congregation (CTHC), also called the Great Synagogue, is a Modern Orthodox Jewish congregation and synagogue, located in the Company's Garden, in the Gardens neighborhood of Cape Town, South Africa. The congregation was established in 1841, making it the oldest Jewish congregation in South Africa.

The congregation, known as "The Mother Synagogue of South Africa," possesses two historic structures, the 1863 synagogue known as the Old Shul and the 1905 synagogue. The South African Jewish Museum, located in its grounds, also occupies the Old Shul and is responsible for its upkeep. The 1905 building is an example of Edwardian architecture and has been called "one of the most magnificent synagogues in the world."

== History ==
The congregation first met in 1841 on Erev Yom Kippur in a private home. The next week it established the Society of the Jewish Community of Cape Town, Cape of Good Hope or Tikvath Israel (tikvath meaning "hope").

In 1842 it purchased land on Albert Road in Woodstock to establish a cemetery for the congregation, after the Municipality of Cape Town refused a request for a customary free grant of land for a cemetery and demanded the congregation pay £10 (equivalent to R2,000 in 2018). for a plot on Somerset Road. The congregation was upset by the refusal and the plot's proximity to a slave cemetery, which it understood as a reference by the Municipality to Jews being descended from slaves in Egypt, so it withdrew the application and raised funds for the Woodstock plot.

The congregation moved into a purpose-built synagogue in 1848, next to the Houses of Parliament. Rabbi Isaac Pulver, the first rabbi at this location, left for Australia after two years because, he said "first, that I cannot get kosher meat, secondly that I cannot, as a Jewish parent, bring up my children in a place where so little regard is paid to the principles of our Holy Religion; and thirdly, that, notwithstanding nearly two years’ trial to live as economically as possible, I could not make my income meet my expenses."

Pulver was replaced by Joel Rabinowitz, who formed the Jewish Philanthropic Society (now the Board of Guardians). In 1863 the congregation moved into a larger building, now known as the Old Shul. The architect, James Hogg, is believed to have made a careful analysis of Solomon’s Temple in the Books of Kings and Chronicles, and incorporated features derived from this study in the final plan.

In 1896, the congregation formed its own school on Hope Hill, the Cape Town Hebrew Congregational Public School. It was supported by Cecil Rhodes and Jan Hendrik Hofmeyr and by 1902 had 500 pupils in its high school and separate junior school. It was eventually taken over by the Cape School Board, but lost its character as a Jewish school and closed in 1920.

The previously Anglo-German character of the congregants began to change as significant numbers of more religiously observant Jewish migrants arrived from Eastern Europe between 1880 and 1948. In 1899, 25,000 refugees from the South African War arrived in Cape Town, 3,000 of whom were Jewish and mostly from Eastern Europe. Many of the Jewish refugees' English was not sufficient to easily follow Bender's sermons, and were uncomfortable with the less strict religious observance of the Anglo-German Jewish establishment, and with Bender's antipathy towards Zionism. The monopoly of the CTHC was broken and The New Hebrew Congregation was formed, with its Roeland Street Shul opened in 1902, accommodating the less affluent, more religiously observant Jewish migrants from Eastern Europe.

The CTHC began a building fund for a larger, more ornate synagogue. It was designed by architects Parker and Forsythe and built at a price of £26,000, and could accommodate 1500 worshipers. The synagogue was opened in 1905 by the CTHC President, who was also Cape Town's first Jewish mayor, Hyman Liberman.

In 1937, Bender retired and was succeeded by Rabbi Israel Abrahams, who was Cape Chief Rabbi for the next thirty years. Both Bender and Abrahams occupied the chair of Hebrew studies at the University of Cape Town and had the title of Professor. Abrahams was heavily involved with the establishment of United Herzlia Schools.

In 1942 Abrahams addressed Cape Town City Hall as news emerged of the Holocaust unfolding in Europe, telling attendees that two million souls, each one created in the image of God, had been destroyed from this earth. Abrahams was cautious about the arrival of Reform Judaism in Cape Town, with Temple Israel having opened in 1944. He arranged a series of meetings on the perils of the Reform tradition, and upon his appointment as Chief Rabbi in the Cape in 1951, attempted to prohibit his rabbis, cantors and Hebrew teachers from meeting with rabbis and other representatives of the Reform movement. He also attempted to prevent the movement from hiring communal halls.

There were tensions between the congregation and the burgeoning Orthodox synagogue, Marais Road Shul in Sea Point, particularly between Abrahams and that congregation's rabbi, Rabbi Shrock. In 1949, Abrahams had blocked Shrock's appointment to the Beit Din. Shrock and his congregation also opposed Abrahams' appointment as Chief Rabbi of Cape Town, and rejected the notion of a Chief Rabbi for the Cape This would allow Abrahams to make decision about their synagogue and presume a higher status than Rabbi Shrock. The congregation's representatives did not attend a vote for a Chief Rabbi and in their absence, Rabbi Abrahams was elected, with Rabbi Shrock as deputy Chief Rabbi. Shrock rejected the deputy position and the congregation left the Cape Board of Deputies and United Council of Synagogues. A decision was made to federate with the Roeland Street and Vredehoek synagogues to strengthen their position. The congregation rejoined the UC in 1955 on the condition that by rejoining, it did not imply that the congregation would be under the authority of the Cape Chief Rabbi and that the synagogue would remain independent.

The synagogue was the seat of the Chief Rabbi of the Jewish congregations of the then Cape Province, as well as of South West Africa and the Sephardi Congregation of Rhodesia (only since 1986 has South Africa had one sole Chief Rabbi for the country). In 1965, Walter Gradner, president of the congregation, also became Mayor of Cape Town.

Membership progressively declined as much of the City Bowl Jewish population migrated to the Southern Suburbs and Sea Point. In 1995, the synagogue took the lead in Cape Town by hosting a memorial service for the murdered Israeli president, Yitzhak Rabin. At the turn of the millennium, the congregation was reinvigorated by the development of its campus in providing the South African Jewish Museum, the Cape Town Holocaust Centre, the Jacob Gitlin Library, the Gardens Jewish Community Centre and the kosher cafe, Café Riteve. In 2007, the congregation hired a 24-year old Chabad rabbi, Osher Feldman from Sydney as its new spiritual leader. The cantor is Choni Goldman, also known as Choni G.

== Gallery ==
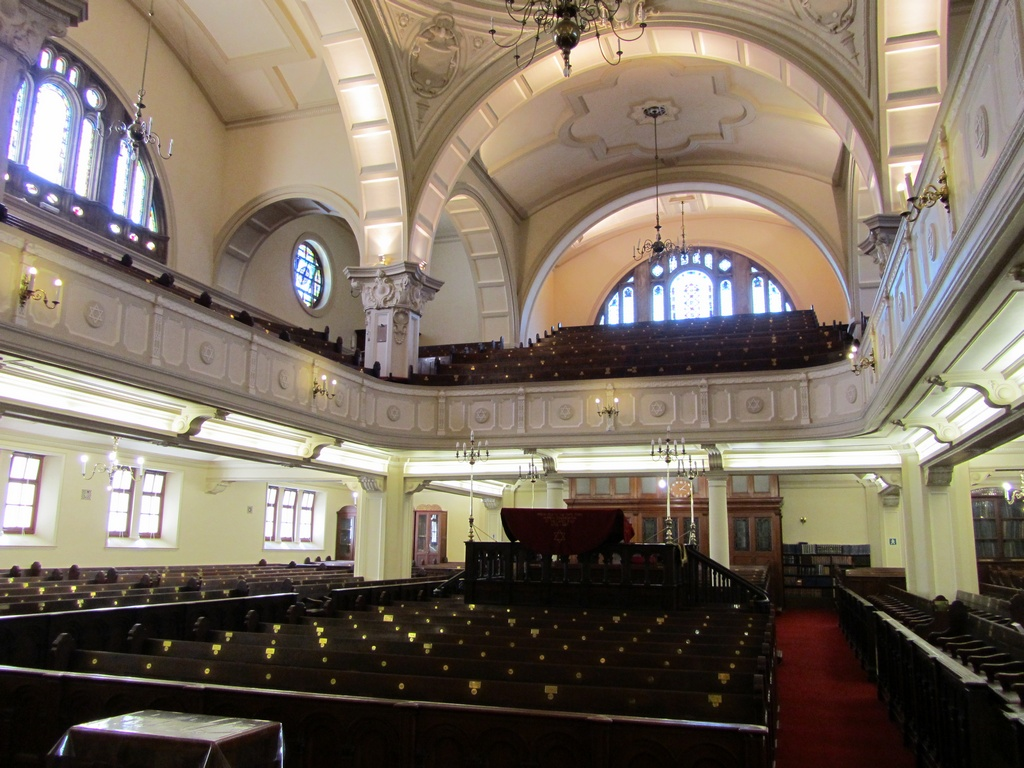
Sanctuary of the 1905 synagogue

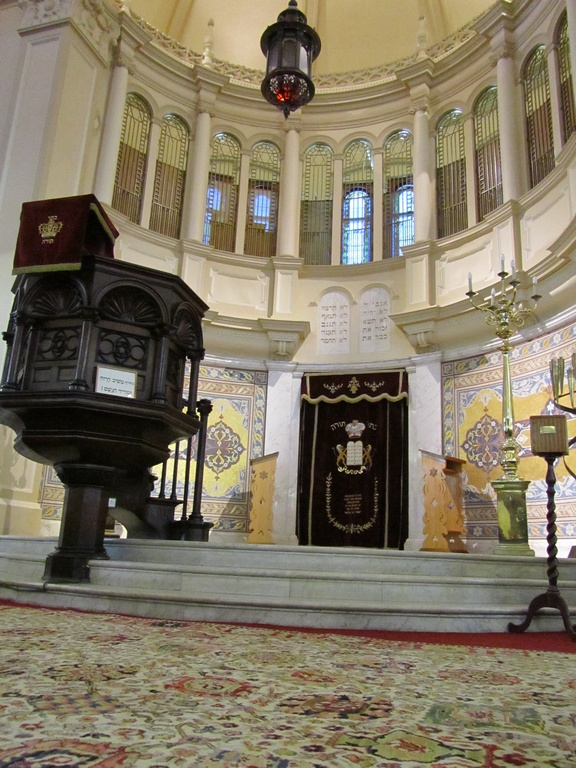
Bimah of the 1905 synagogue

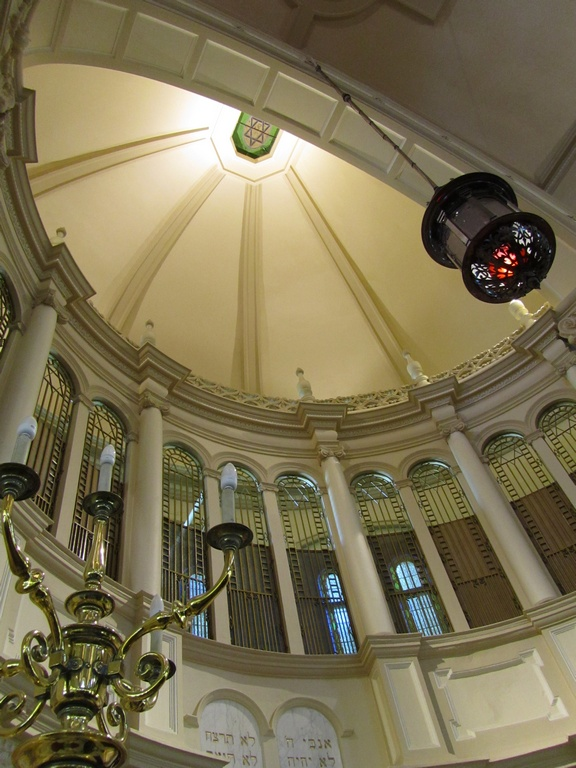
Interior detail of the 1905 synagogue

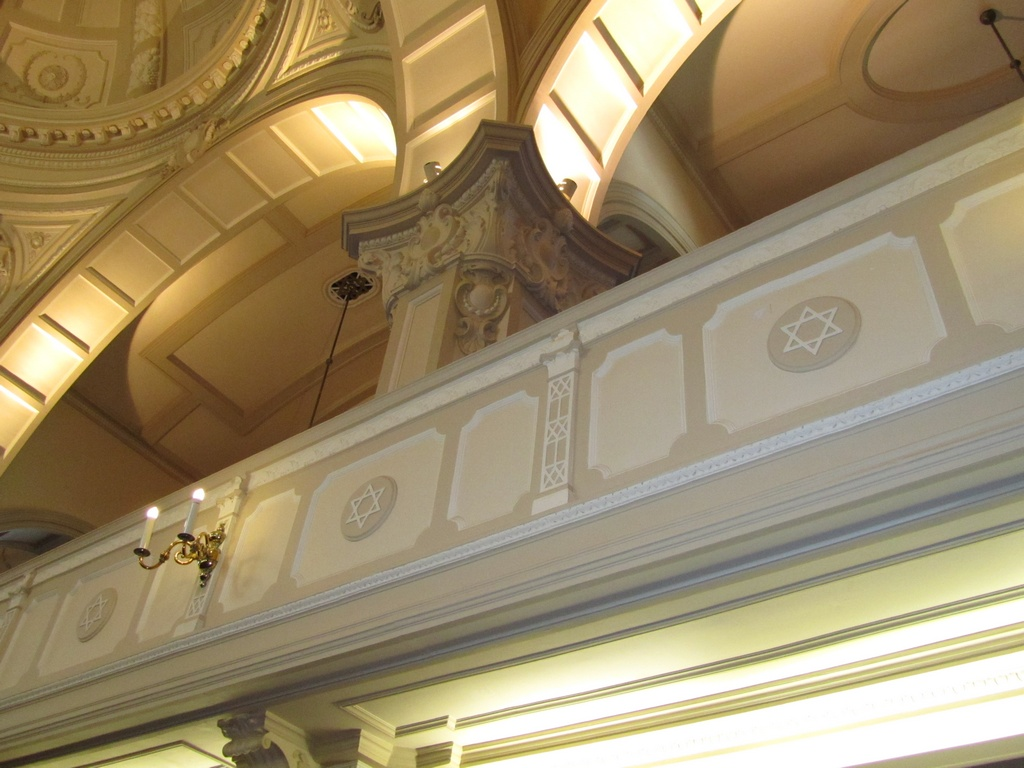
Interior detail of the 1905 synagogue

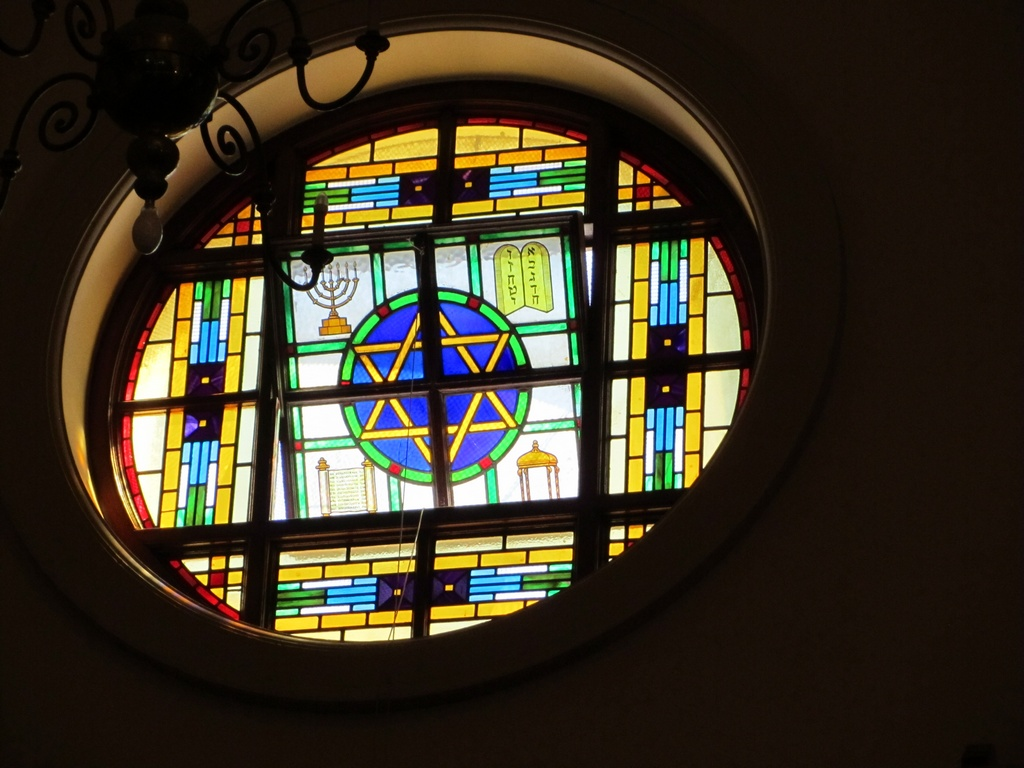
Stained glass window of the 1905 synagogue

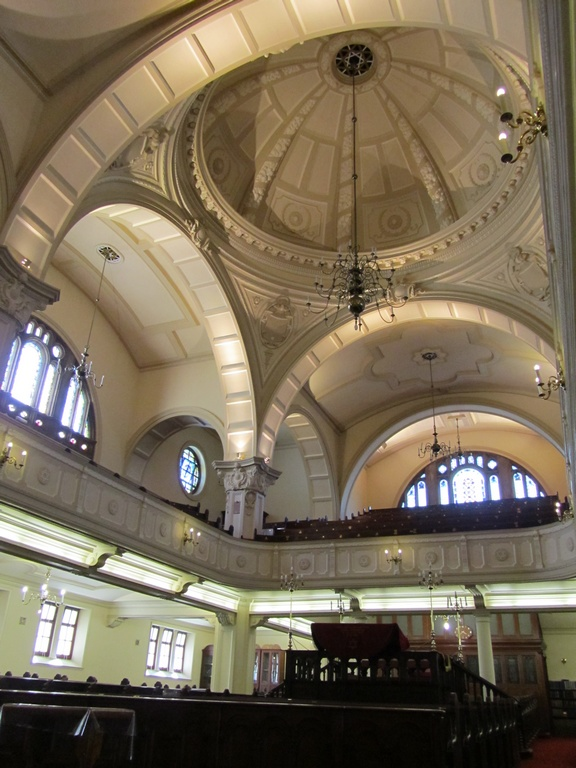
Ceiling detail of the 1905 synagogue

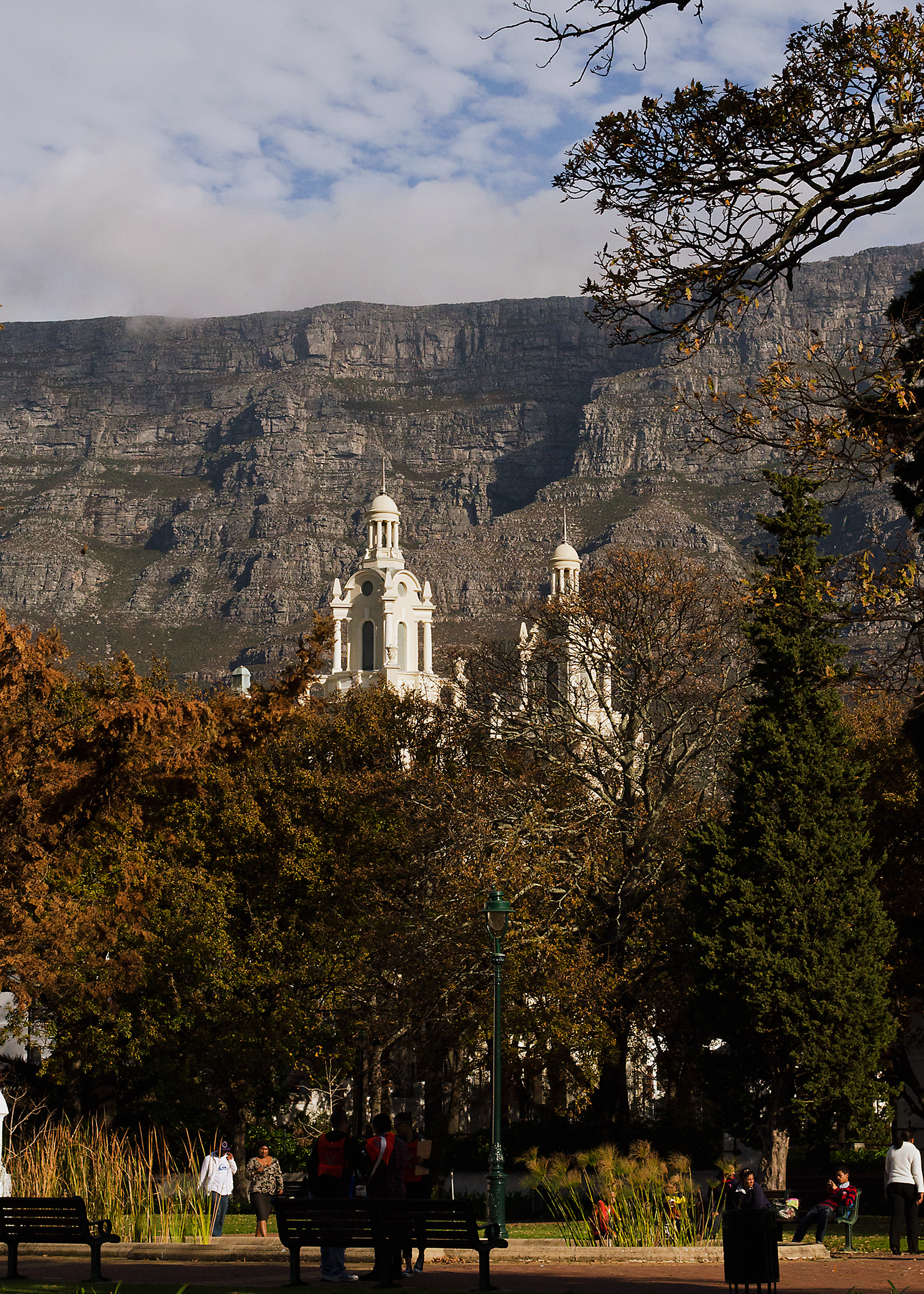
The 1905 synagogue beneath Table Mountains, seen from Company's Garden

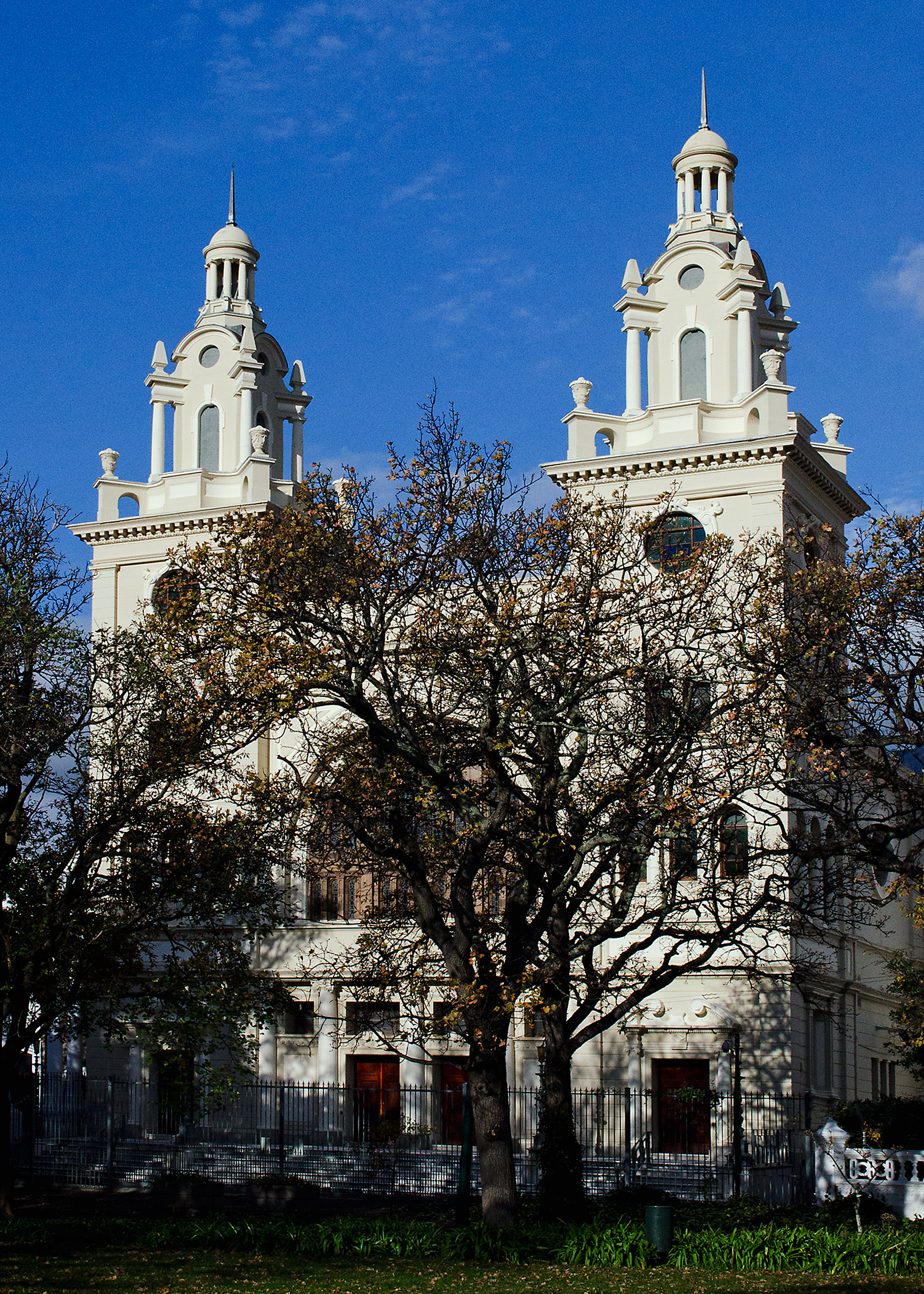
1905 synagogue seen from Company's Garden

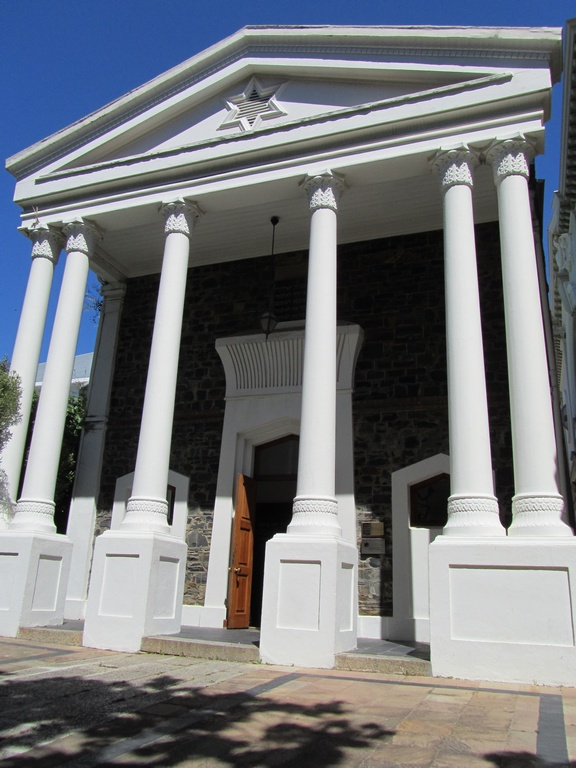
The Old Shul

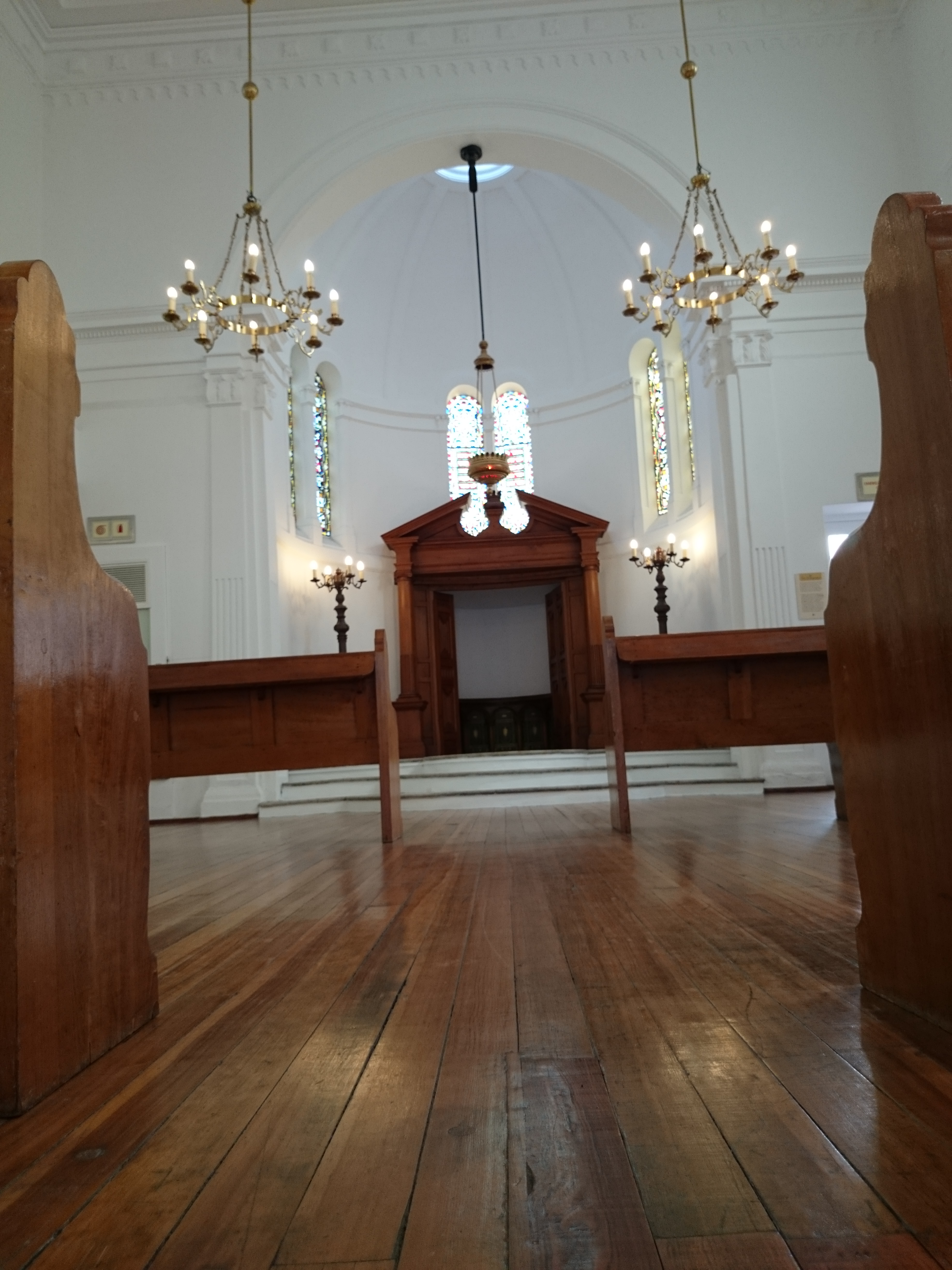
Interior of the Old Shul

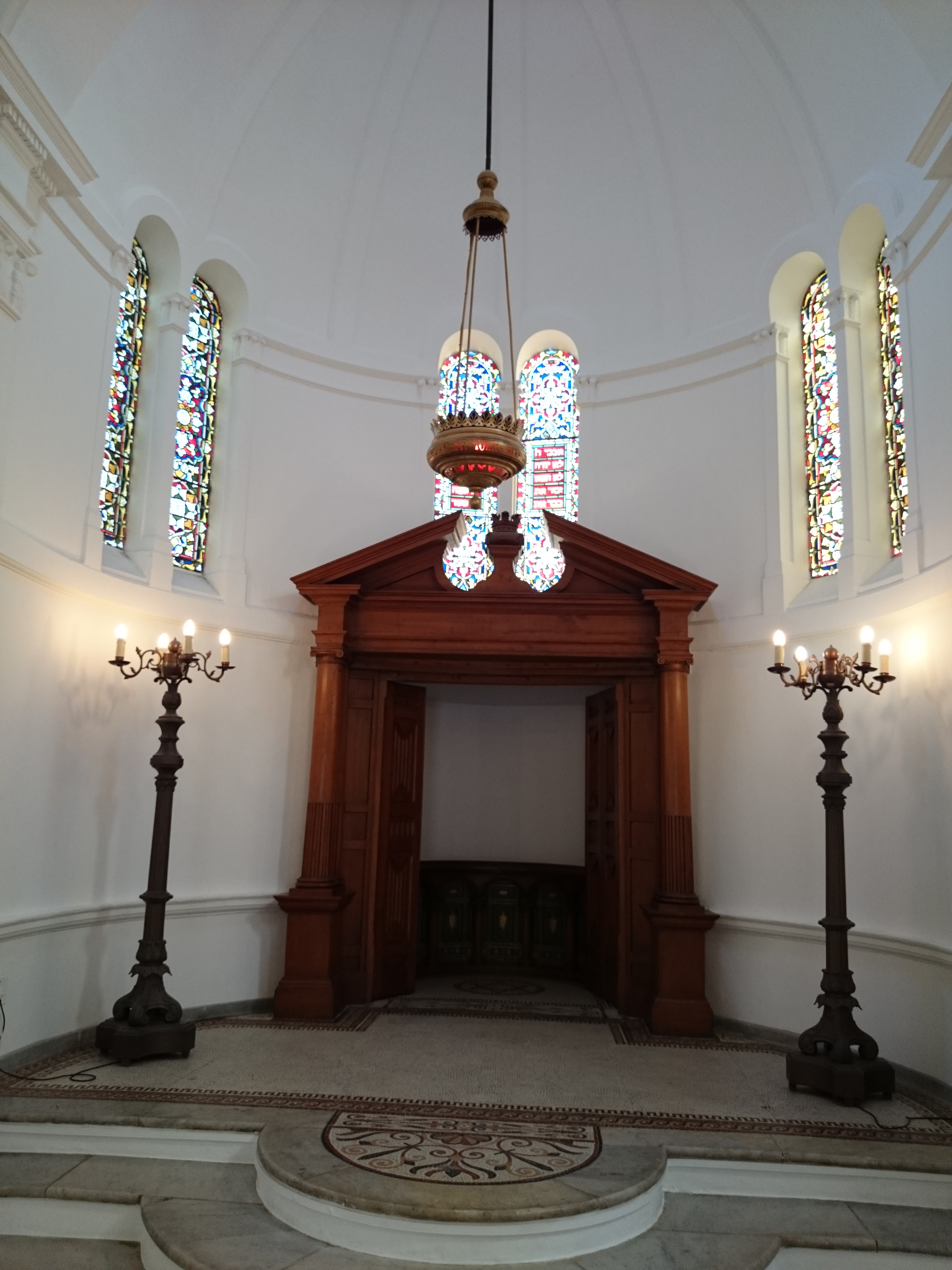
Interior of the Old Shul

== Notable members ==
- Nik Rabinowitz, comedian
- Jane Raphaely, publisher

== See also ==
- Cape Town Holocaust Centre
- History of the Jews in South Africa
- Jacob Gitlin Library
- List of synagogues in South Africa
- Oldest synagogues in the world
