= Mendel Kaplan (philanthropist) =

South African industrialist and philanthropist (1936–2009)

- Born: 16 June 1936; Cape Town, South Africa
- Died: 19 November 2009 (aged 73); Cape Town, South Africa
- Education: University of Cape Town; Columbia University
- Occupations: Industrialist, philanthropist

Mendel Israel Kaplan (16 June 1936 – 19 November 2009) was a South African Jewish industrialist and philanthropist. He was an executive in Cape Gate manufacturing company.

Mendel Kaplan was born in South Africa. After graduating from Wynberg Boys' High, he received a degree in law from the University of Cape Town in 1958 and an MBA from Columbia University in 1960.

Kaplan was the honorary president of Keren Hayesod and a former chairman of the Jewish Agency's Board of Governors. He financed numerous philanthropic projects in South Africa, Israel and Jewish communities around the world. In 1980, he founded the Isaac and Jessie Kaplan Centre for Jewish Studies at the University of Cape Town. In 2000, he established the South African Jewish Museum.

Kaplan was an Israeli citizen and owned two homes in Israel.

He was a keen rugby union fan, and helped set up the South African Jewish Museum.

Kaplan died of a stroke on 19 November 2009.
