= Cape Town Holocaust Centre =

Holocaust museum in South Africa

Cape Town Holocaust & Genocide Centre

- Location within Cape Town
- Established: 1999
- Location: 88 Hatfield St; Gardens; Cape Town
- Coordinates: 33.9302989°S 18.4166267°E
- Type: Holocaust museum
- Director: Heather Blumenthal
- Website: ctholocaust.co.za

The Cape Town Holocaust & Genocide Centre began as Africa's first Holocaust centre founded in 1999. It has sister Centres in Johannesburg (Johannesburg Holocaust and Genocide Centre) and Durban (Durban Holocaust Centre), and together they form part of the association, the South African Holocaust & Genocide Foundation (SAHGF). The SAHGF determines the educational and philosophical direction of the centre. It also conducts teacher training and is the only accredited service-provider for in-service training in Holocaust education in the country. It has trained over 5,000 teachers.

The museum is situated in the downtown neighbourhood of Gardens in Cape Town. It is located in the grounds of Gardens Shul, and is in the same complex as the South African Jewish Museum and the Gardens Jewish Community Centre. It is also close to the Iziko South African National Gallery and Houses of Parliament. The centre works towards creating a more caring and just society in which human rights and diversity are respected and valued. Through exhibitions, events and workshops, they endeavour to commemorate the victims and survivors of the Nazi regime and the numerous genocides that happened before and since the Holocaust.

The museum has a permanent exhibition that combines text, archival photographs, film footage, documents, multimedia displays and recreated environments. They also offer educational programmes of various types, for groups such as students or educators. The Holocaust is taught within a South African context; lessons on racism and apartheid are mixed together.

== History ==
The origins of the centre can be traced back to the major public interest in an Anne Frank exhibition that opened in Johannesburg in 1994. President Nelson Mandela and Archbishop Desmond Tutu attended the opening on 15 August. The Diary of Anne Frank had also been of the books available to Robben Island prisoners. At the launch, Mandela said: "During the many years my comrades and I spent in prison, we derived inspiration from the courage and tenacity of those who challenge injustice even under the most difficult circumstances. . . . Some of us read Anne Frank's Diary on Robben Island and derived much encouragement from it."

Since 2007, "The Holocaust and Human Rights" — has been a required part of South Africa's ninth grade social sciences (history) curriculum since 2007. Therefore, it is frequently visited by school groups. In 2007, the United States Holocaust Memorial Museum's Darfur exhibition was shown at the Centre and the Centre has also showcased an exhibition of the Rwandan Genocide.

=== Permanent exhibition ===
The permanent exhibition is made up of three different galleries. The first is dedicated to Racism and Discrimination, the second to the Third Reich and the third to Ghettos.

Racism and Discrimination deals with the themes: Racism, Antisemitism in South Africa, Apartheid, The Final Solution, Rescue, Resistance and liberation.

The Third Reich includes the themes; Jewish life in Europe before the Holocaust, Germany and the rise of Nazism 1919-1933, The Third Reich 1933-1939, The power of propaganda (masses), The power of propaganda (youth), Antisemitic policies, They too were victims, The Nazi concentration camp universe, Nazi camps, Seeking refuge, Kristallnacht-The night of broken glass, Nazism engulfs the Jews of Europe, Deportation and the Death Camps and Seeking Justice.

Ghettos deals with: Segregation and isolation, The Warsaw Ghetto, Mass murder begins

The permanent exhibition also includes a Collection on Anne Frank and a video testimony from Holocaust survivors that emigrated to South Africa.

=== Patrons ===
- Justice Richard J Goldstone
- Professor Pumla Gobodo-Madikizela
- Chief Rabbi Warren Goldstein
- Professor Jonathan Jansen
- Desmond M Tutu, Archbishop Emeritus

=== Trustees ===
- (chairman)Gerald Diamond
- Philip Krawitz
- Natalie Barnett
- Ann Harris
- Myra Osrin
- Ernest Kajabo
- Beverley Cohen
- Prof Milton Shain
- Prof Tim Murithi

== See also ==
- List of Holocaust museums
- Simon Wiesenthal Center
- Yad Vashem
- Yom HaShoah
