= Arthur Bisset =

South African cricketer

Personal information
- Full name: Arthur Vintcent Crossley Bisset
- Born: 15 January 1879; Kenilworth, Cape Town, Cape Colony
- Died: 8 March 1955 (aged 76); Wynberg, Cape Town, South Africa
- Batting: Right-handed
- Bowling: Right-arm leg-spin
- Relatives: Bill Bisset (brother); Murray Bisset (brother); James Bisset (father)

Domestic team information
- Years: Team
- 1902-03 to 1921-22: Western Province

Career statistics
Competition	First-class
Matches	25
Runs scored	697
Batting average	15.48
100s/50s	0/1
Top score	94
Balls bowled	549
Wickets	7
Bowling average	37.85
5 wickets in innings	0
10 wickets in match	0
Best bowling	2/33
Catches/stumpings	13/–
- Source: Cricinfo, 4 June 2020

Arthur Vintcent Crossley Bisset (15 January 1879 – 8 March 1955) was a South African cricketer who played first-class cricket for Western Province from 1903 to 1922.

== Life and family ==
Bisset was born in Kenilworth, Cape Town, one of the sons of Wynberg mayor James Bisset and a grandson of Cape Town mayor Hercules Jarvis. He attended Diocesan College in Rondebosch. One of his brothers, Bill, played rugby union for South Africa. Another brother, Murray, captained the South African Test cricket team and was Governor of Southern Rhodesia in 1928.

Arthur Bisset married Dorothy Edith Mallett in Wynberg in March 1935. They had three daughters.

== Cricket career ==
Arthur Bisset was one of several inexperienced players selected for the privately organised South African tour of England in 1901. His brother Murray was the captain. Arthur made his first-class debut in the first match, against Hampshire, scoring 94 in the first innings. It was the only time he reached 50 in his career. He had a moderate tour, scoring 405 first-class runs at an average of 19.28, but he also scored 151 in a minor match against Durham.

He continued playing occasionally for Western Province until the 1921–22 season. Later in his career he was a useful leg-spin bowler.
