= Wynberg =

Wynberg may refer to:

- Wynberg, Cape Town, suburb of Cape Town, South Africa
- Wynberg, Gauteng, suburb of Johannesburg, South Africa

== See also ==
- Wynberg Park, a park in Wynberg, Cape Town, South Africa
- Wynberg St Johns, South African football club
