= International cricket in 1898–99 =

International cricket season

The 1898–99 international cricket season was from September 1898 to April 1899.

== Season overview ==
International tours
Start date	Home team	Away team	Results [Matches]			
Start date	Home team	Away team	Test	ODI	FC	LA
14 February 1898	South Africa	England	0–2 [2]	—	—	—
17 February 1898	Australia	New Zealand	—	—	0–2 [2]	—

== February ==
=== England in South Africa ===
Test match series
No.	Date	Home captain	Away captain	Venue	Result
Test No: 58	14–16 February	Murray Bisset	Lord Hawke	Old Wanderers, London	England by 32 runs
Test No: 59	1–3 April	Murray Bisset	Lord Hawke	Newlands Cricket Ground, Cape Town	England by 210 runs
