= Difford =

Difford is a surname. Notable people with the surname include:

- Archibald Difford (1883–1918), South African first-class cricketer
- Chris Difford (born 1954), English singer, musician and songwriter

== Fictional characters ==
- Pastor Jeff Difford, a character in Young Sheldon, portrayed by Matt Hobby
