= Dirk Gysbert van Breda =

South African politician (1803–1870)

Mayor of Cape Town
- In office 1860–1860
- Preceded by: Hercules Crosse Jarvis
- Succeeded by: Gillis J. de Korte
- In office 1865–1866
- Preceded by: Joseph Barry
- Succeeded by: Gillis J. de Korte

Personal details
- Born: Dirk Gysbertus van Reenen van Breda; 5 May 1803 Cape Town, Cape Colony
- Died: 14 November 1870 (aged 67) Oranjezicht, Cape Town, Cape Colony
- Spouse: Susanna Hendrina Wilhelmina Meyer
- Relations: Michiel van Breda (father)
- Children: 12

Dirk Gysbertus van Reenen van Breda (5 May 1803 – 14 November 1870) was a politician from Cape Colony.

== Biography ==
Van Breda was born on 5 May 1803, in Cape Town, the second son of the first mayor of Cape Town, Michiel van Breda and his first wife, Catharina Geesje van Reenen. He married Susanna Hendrina Wilhelmina Meyer on 9 September 1828 in Cape Town.

In 1839, he bought the farms Rietfontein and Buffeljagt in the Swellendam district, where he farmed mainly with merino sheep. After his father's death in 1847, and in 1851, van Breda bought the two properties, Oranjezicht and Oudekraal from the deceased estate. Van Breda was a shrewd and intelligent farmer and was a member of the Legislative Council of the Cape Colony’s first elected parliament and a Cape Town municipal commissioner. In 1860 he became chairman of the Municipal Board of Cape Town, effectively the role of Mayor. He fulfilled the role for only one year, but between 1865 and 1866, served a second term as Mayor, being the first to do so.

Unfortunately, two of his sons, Dirk Gysbert and the younger Pieter Johannes Albertus, did not inherit their father's good nature. Both were known for their violent and abusive behaviour towards slaves and even their own wives and barely six months after their father's death they both killed their wives.

Dirk Gysbert van Reenen van Breda died on his farm, Oranjezicht on 11 November 1870.
