= Murray Bisset =

South African cricketer and British Governor of Southern Rhodesia

Sir Murray Bisset
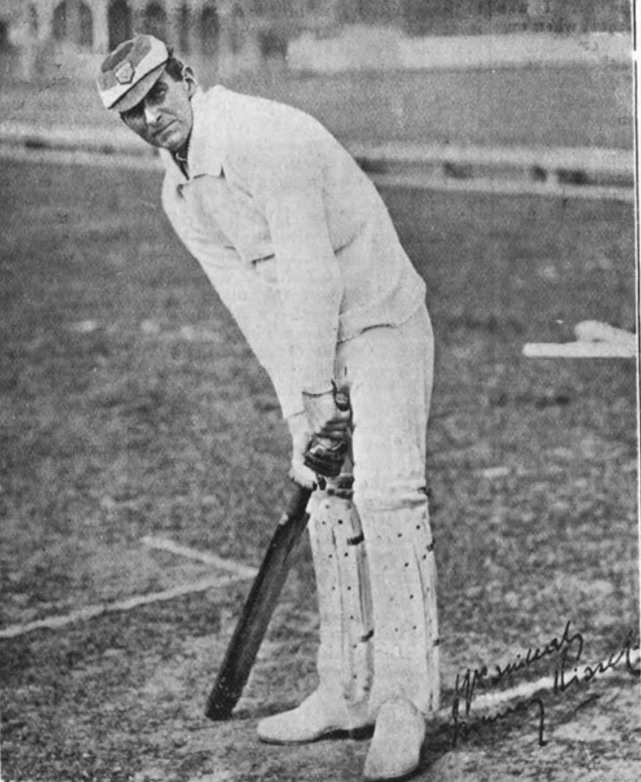
- Murray Bisset in 1901

Personal information
- Born: 14 April 1876; Port Elizabeth, Cape Colony
- Died: 24 October 1931 (aged 55); Salisbury, Southern Rhodesia
- Batting: Right-handed
- Bowling: Slow left-arm orthodox
- Relatives: Bill Bisset (brother); Arthur Bisset (brother); James Bisset (father)

International information
- National side: South Africa

Domestic team information
- Years: Team
- 1891-92 to 1909-10: Western Province

Career statistics
Competition	Tests	First-class
Matches	3	40
Runs scored	103	1436
Batting average	25.75	23.54
100s/50s	0/0	2/4
Top score	35	184
Balls bowled	–	192
Wickets	–	5
Bowling average	–	24.39
5 wickets in innings	–	0
10 wickets in match	–	0
Best bowling	–	2/20
Catches/stumpings	2/1	51/13
- Source: Cricinfo

Sir Murray Bisset (14 April 1876 – 24 October 1931) was a South African Test cricketer and politician. He captained the South African cricket team in 1899 before moving to Southern Rhodesia where he served as Chief Justice of Southern Rhodesia from 1927 to 1931 and briefly as Governor of Southern Rhodesia.

== Early life ==
Born in Port Elizabeth, Bisset was the fifth son of James Bisset, engineer and former Mayor of Wynberg, and Elizabeth Magdalena Christina née Jarvis, daughter of Hercules Jarvis (MLC, MLA) former Mayor of Cape Town. He was educated at Diocesan College, Rondebosch.

== Cricket career ==
While still at school, Bisset gained a reputation as a batsman and a wicket-keeper who could stand up to the fastest bowlers. He made his first class cricket debut for Western Province on 18 April 1895 against Transvaal at Durban, scoring 0 and five not out. Despite this setback, Bisset was a regular member of the Western Province side, scoring an unbeaten 124 against Transvaal in 1897, leading to his announcement as captain of the Western Province side for the Currie Cup final that year. He scored 5 and 63*, enough to secure his position as South African captain against the touring English side in 1898-99. Aged 22, Bisset remained Test cricket's youngest captain until Ian Craig captained Australia in 1957.

Playing as a wicket-keeper batsman, Bisset scored 35 and 21* and took a catch and a stumping. Bisset also captained the Second Test of the series but, due to the vagaries of turn of the century international cricket it would be another 11 years before Bisset played his third and final Test.

Bisset studied law and, following graduation, was admitted to the Cape Bar in 1899 and practised in the Cape before serving in the intelligence services during the South African War. Following his war service, In 1901, Bisset led the South African team to England in the face of fierce criticism that the tour was taking place during the war. Bisset starred on the tour, which did not include a Test, including 184 against Derbyshire, his highest first-class score.

Returning to South Africa, Bisset continued to play cricket when his burgeoning legal career allowed. He was recalled for the Fifth Test between South Africa and England at Cape Town in 1909-10, where he kept wicket and batted in the middle order. Following the match, Bisset retired to concentrate on his legal career. In all, Bisset played 40 first-class matches, scoring 1441 runs at 23.62 with two centuries, taking five wickets at 24.40 and taking 51 catches and 13 stumpings.

== Political career ==
In 1914, Bisset was elected to the House of Assembly as a South African Party representative for South Peninsula, holding his seat until his retirement from politics in 1924. While in parliament, Bisset unsuccessfully introduced a Private Members Bill in 1921 whereby a widow was lawfully entitled to marry her deceased husband's brother.

Following his retirement from politics, Bisset moved to Southern Rhodesia, where he was appointed a senior judge in 1925 and served as Chief Justice of Southern Rhodesia from 1927 until his death. Knighted in the 1928 Birthday Honours, Bisset had served as acting Governor of Southern Rhodesia in 1928 and was serving as governor again in 1931 while the Governor Cecil Hunter-Rodwell was in England, when he died in Salisbury, Southern Rhodesia. He was survived by his wife, Gladys, whom he married in 1905, and one son.

Bisset's brothers Edgar and Arthur Bisset, and brother-in-law Archibald Difford also played first-class cricket in South Africa.

Preceded by John Robert Chancellor	Governor of Southern Rhodesia; 1928	Succeeded by Cecil Hunter-Rodwell
