= Woutersen Wessels Vault =

Coordinates: 33°54′44″S 18°24′45″E

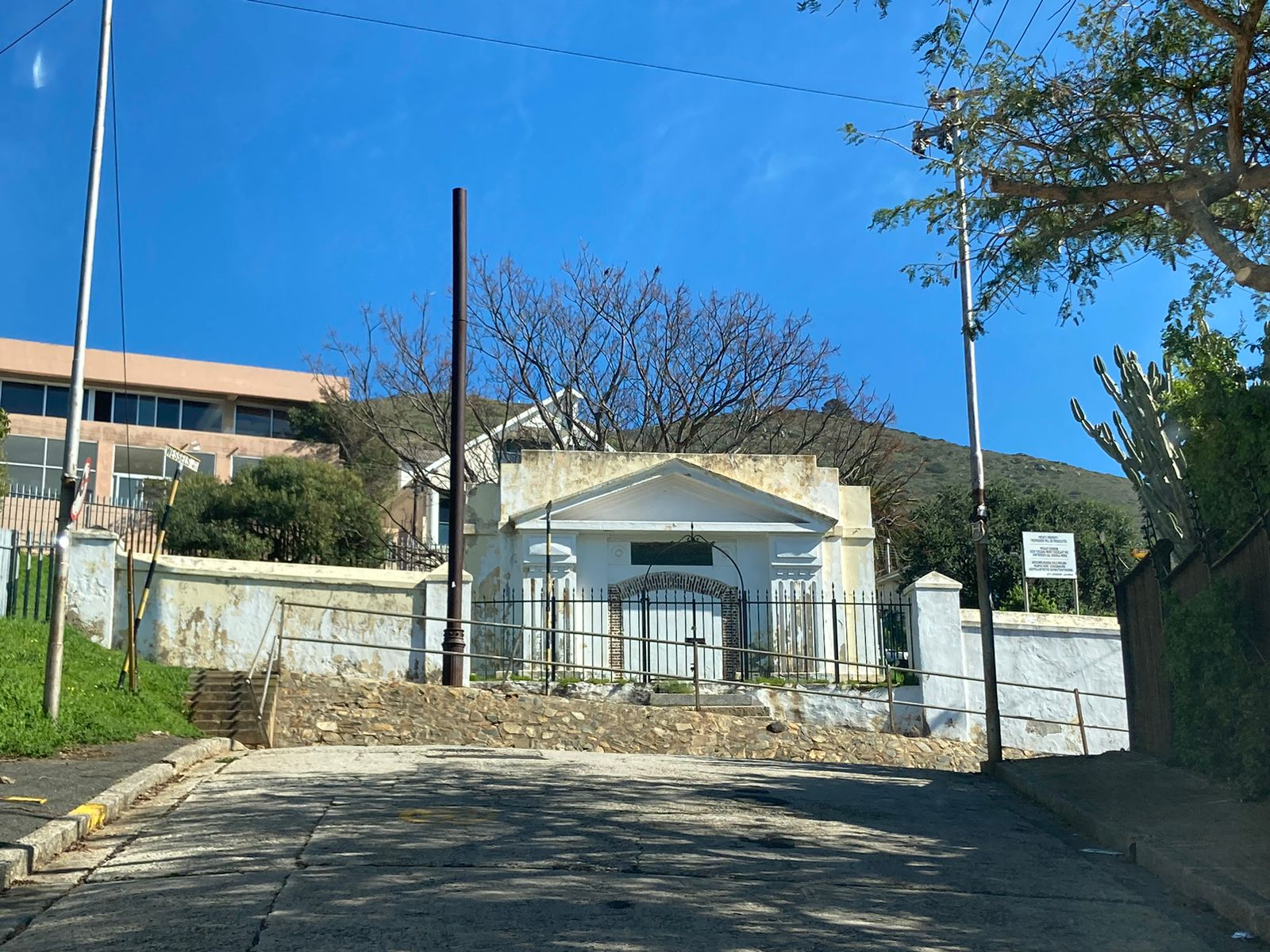
Woutersen Wessels Vault (2024)

The Woutersen Wessels Vault is a historically significant heritage site likely designed by well-known architect Herman Schutte, who designed the Green Point Lighthouse.

According to available records, the vault was built by merchant Pieter Woutersen in the 1820s when it was still practice for Dutch families to bury their dead on their farms and estates. Woutersen was married to Maria de Villiers, who remarried to J. J. L. Smuts, the second mayor of Cape Town, after his death.

The vault, an important part of Cape Town's cultural landscape, is in the quiet residential suburb of Braemar Estate, which was established by the Wessels family in the 1930s on their farmstead. It served as a burial site for members of the Woutersen and Wessels family, who were prominent residents in the area. This list includes Adv. M L Wessels, brother of Sir John Wessels, the former Chief Justice of South Africa from 1932 to 1936.

== Historical significance ==
The Woutersen Wessels Vault stands as one of the earliest known burial sites in Cape Town, representing the architectural and cultural practices of the time. It offers valuable insights into the funerary customs of European settlers and is a rare and well-preserved example of early Cape Dutch cemetery architecture. The vault's historical importance is recognized by its role in reflecting the rich heritage of the Green Point area and its development.

== Architectural features ==
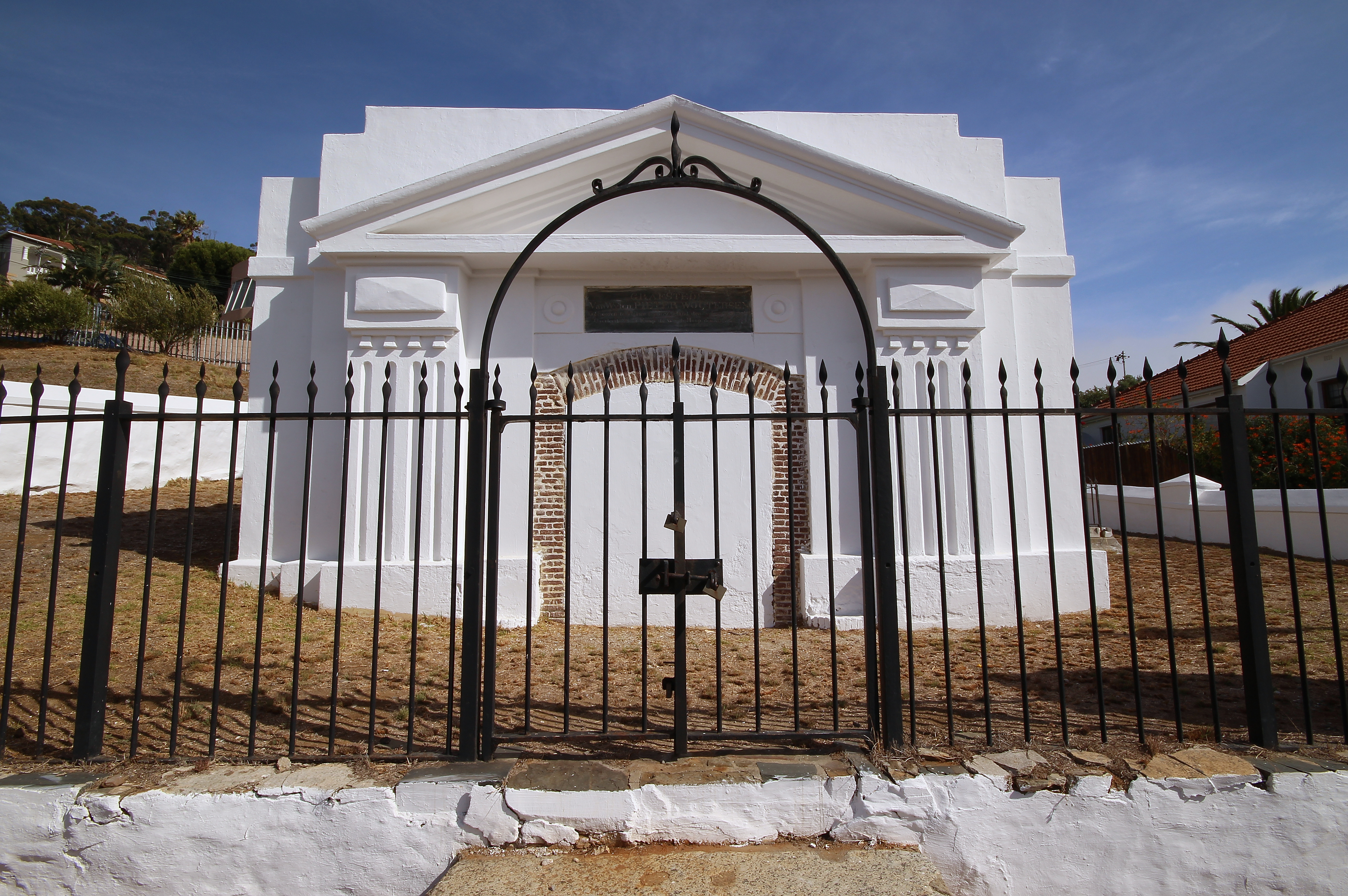
Woutersen-Wessels Vault

The vault is constructed from locally sourced stone, with a flat roof and an unadorned facade, which is characteristic of the practical and enduring design approach favored by early Dutch settlers in the region. Its understated neo-classical style highlights the beauty of simplicity and functionality in early Cape architecture.

The structure stands directly in line with the entrance to the old Victoria Basin of the docks at the V&A Waterfront, and on some old charts it is marked as a landmark for the guidance of ships entering the docks.

A restoration effort was launched in 1991 to help ensure that its historical integrity is preserved for future generations and to prevent deterioration.

== Preservation and heritage status ==
The Woutersen Wessels Vault has been recognized for its outstanding cultural and historical value, earning its status as a protected heritage site. This designation ensures that the vault is safeguarded as a vital link to the past, offering present and future generations a tangible connection to Cape Town's early history.
