= Wynberg Park =

Park in Wynberg, Cape Town, South Africa

Coordinates: 34.001663°S 18.453550°E

Wynberg park
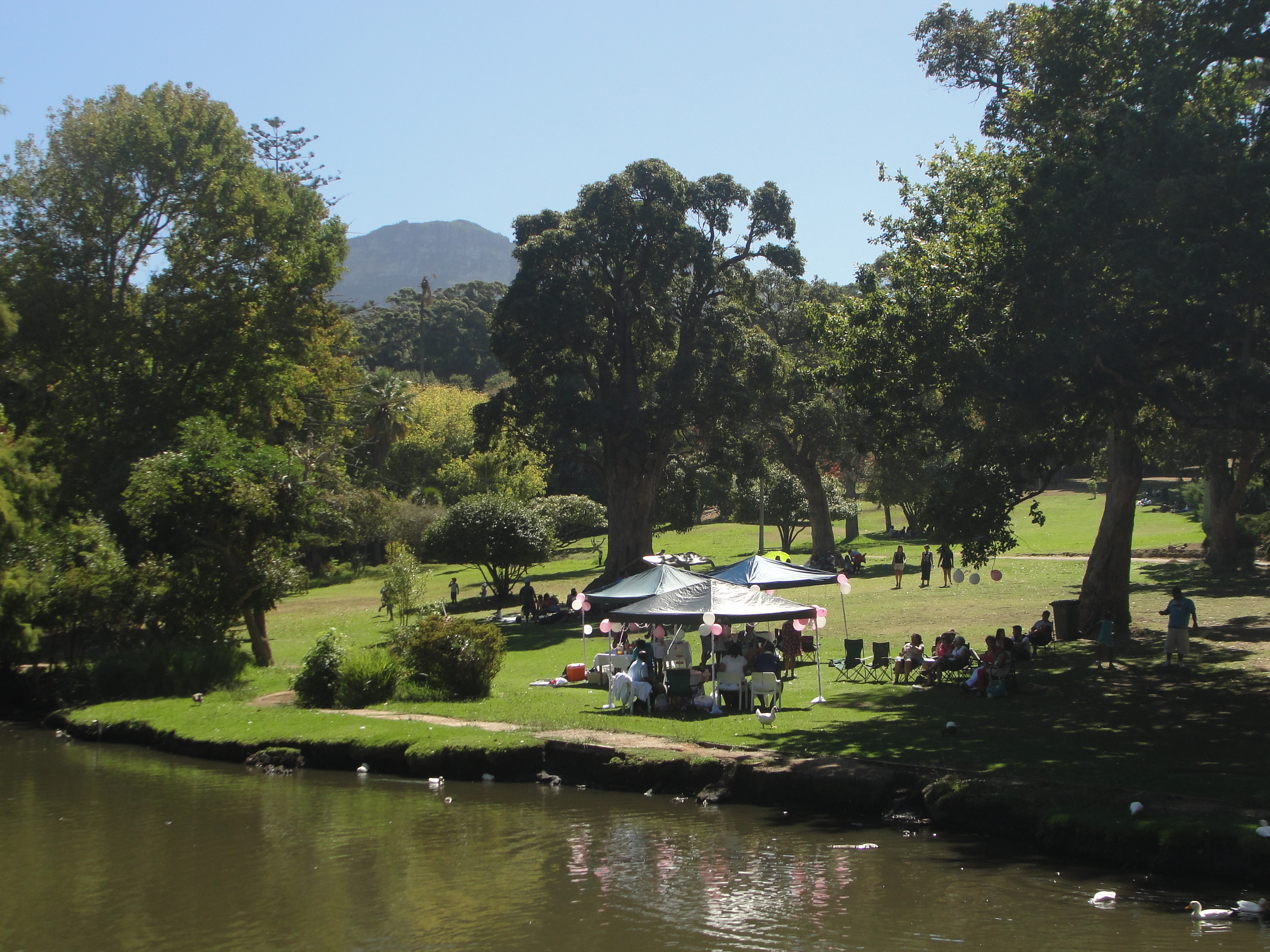
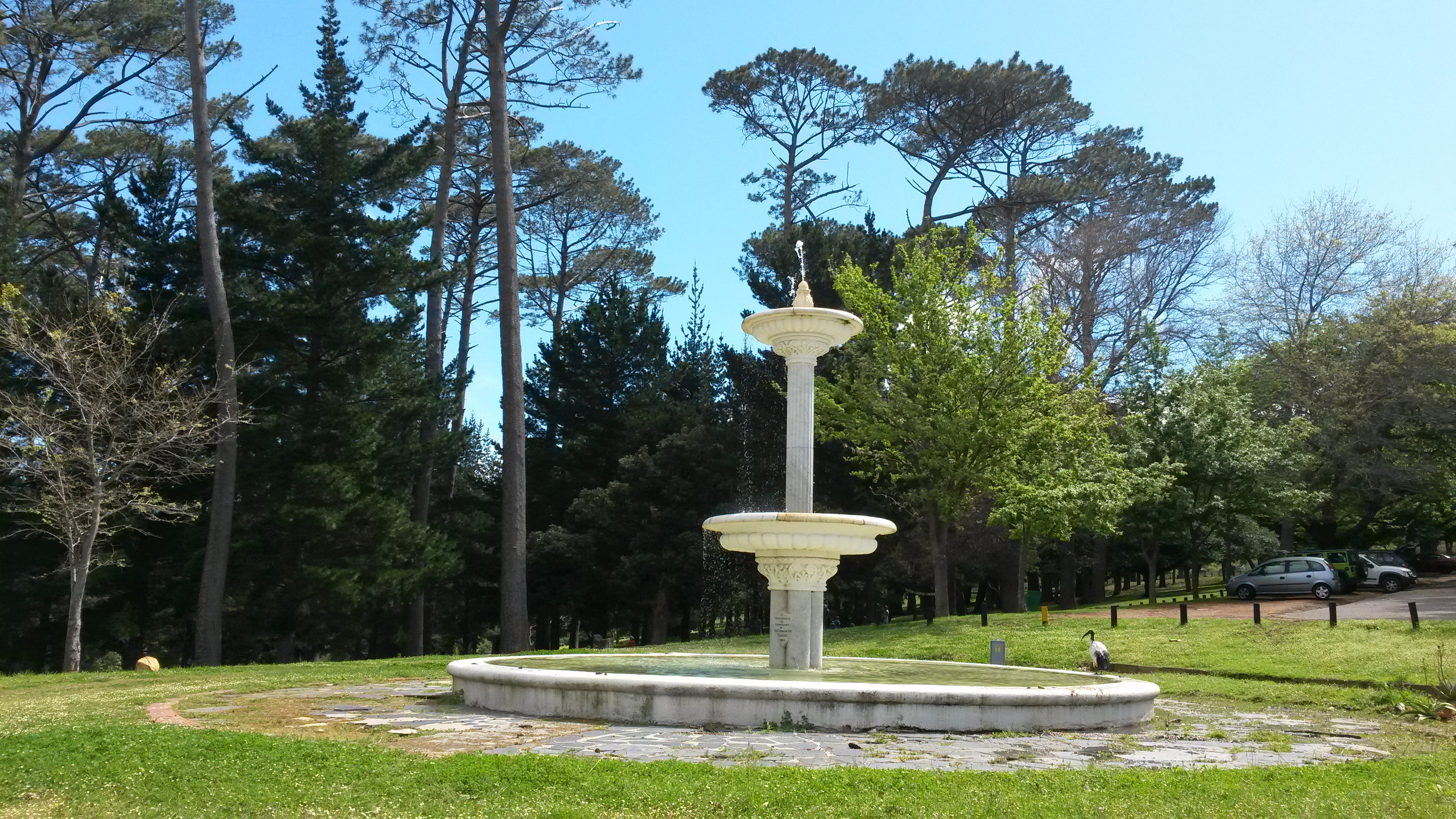
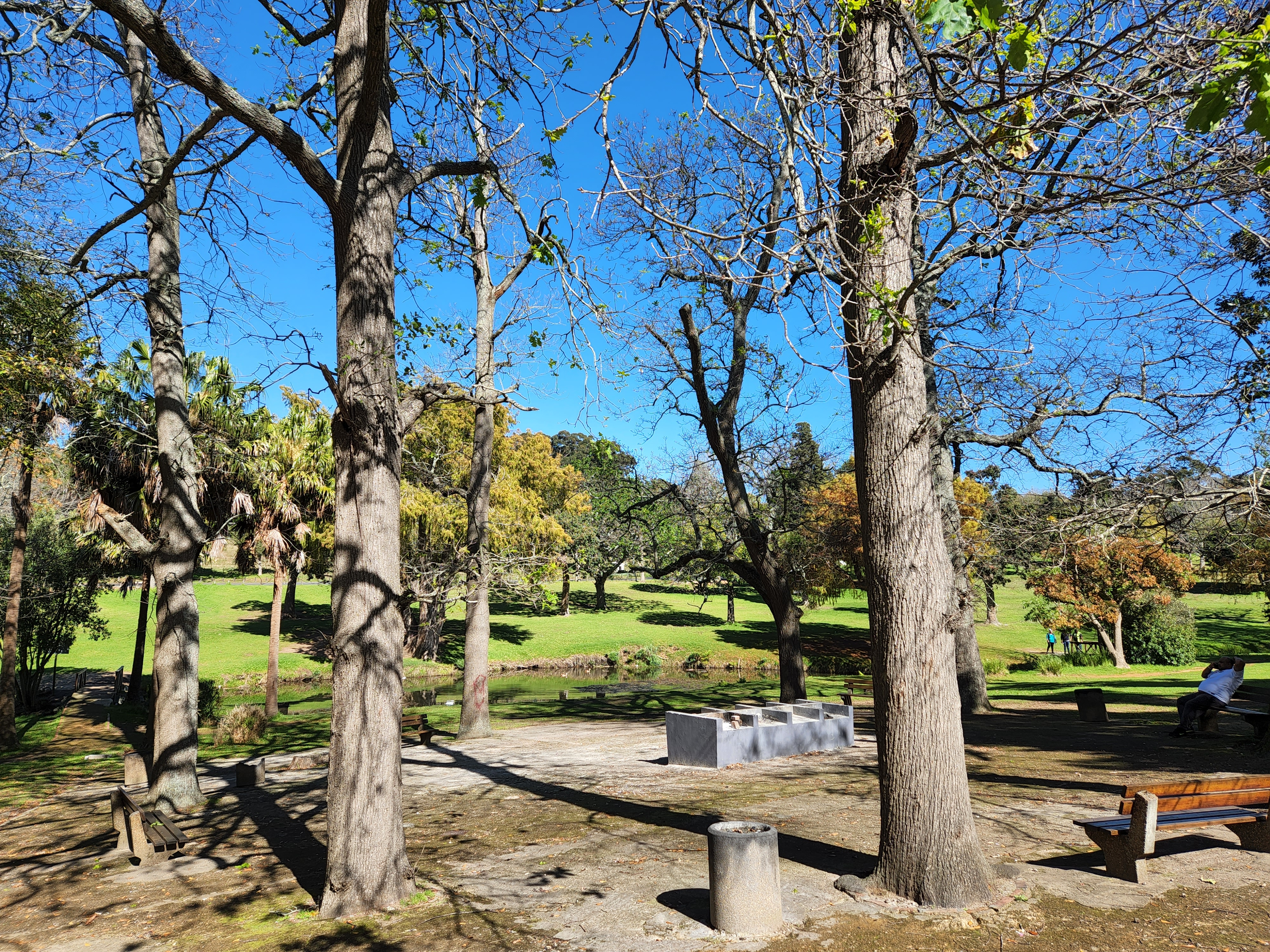
- Duck pond in Wynberg Park. King Edward VII corenation fountain (1902) One of the public braai areas.
- Interactive map of Wynberg park
- Type: Garden and playground
- Location: Wynberg, Cape Town, 7708, South Africa
- Area: 22 hectares
- Established: 1902
- Operator: City of Cape Town; Friends of Wynberg Park
- Open: Summer: 08h00 to 19h00. Winter: 08h00 to 18h00.

Wynberg Park, formerly known as King Edward Park, is a park situated in the southern suburb of Wynberg, Cape Town, South Africa. The park has number of amenities including a playground, a duck pond, and multiple braai/barbecue areas.

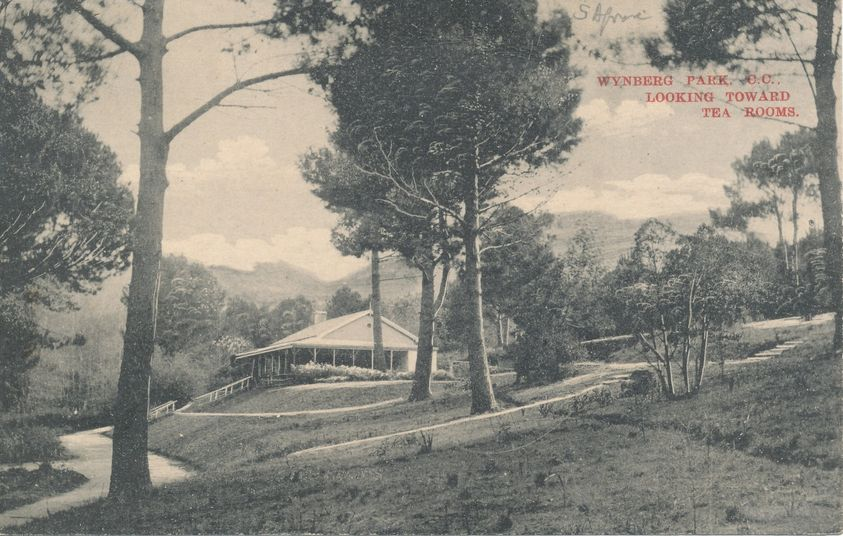
The gardeners cottage at Wynberg Park in 1910, eight years after the park opened.

It was established by the Wynberg Mayor James Bisset, who obtained the land grant for it in the early 1890s. The park was opened in 1902. The park was originally named after King Edward VII, the reigning British monarch at the time. Prior to European settlement in the area it was the location of a large forest of indigenous silvertrees.

The spring and source of the Krakeelwater River is located in the park.

The southern section of the park borders the Wynberg Military base with the 2 Military Hospital building clearly visible from the park.
