= Bill Bisset =

South African rugby union player

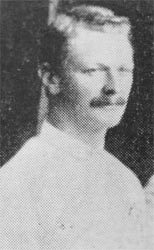
- Born: William Molteno Bisset; 11 September 1867 Kenilworth, Cape Colony
- Died: 23 February 1958 (aged 90) Newlands, South Africa
- School: Diocesan College
- Notable relative: Murray Bisset (brother)

Rugby union career
- Position: Forward
Amateur team(s)
Years	Team	Apps	(Points)
–	Villager Football Club		
Provincial / State sides
Years	Team	Apps	(Points)
1888–1892	Western Province		
International career
Years	Team	Apps	(Points)
1891	South Africa	2	(0)

William Molteno Bisset (11 September 1867 – 23 February 1958) was a South African international rugby union player.

== Early life and ancestry ==
Bisset was born in Kenilworth, Cape Town, the second son of Wynberg Mayor James Bisset and the grandson of Cape Town Mayor Hercules Jarvis. He attended Diocesan College and went on to become a solicitor.

== Rugby career ==
He represented Western Province in the inaugural Currie Cup. He made his only two appearances for South Africa during Great Britain's 1891 tour. He was selected, as a forward, to play in the 1st and 3rd matches of the three Test series, both of which South Africa lost.

=== Test history ===
No.	Opponents	Results(SA 1st)	Position	Tries	Date	Venue
1.	(United Kingdom) British Isles	0–4	Forward		30 Jul 1891	Crusaders Ground, Port Elizabeth
2.	(United Kingdom) British Isles	0–4	Forward		5 Sep 1891	Newlands, Cape Town

== Professional career ==
Bisset was an attorney by profession. He was President of the Law Society (1919–20, 1924–25) and the South African Association in later life. He also came to be a director of companies in later life and he was a founding partner of the law firm Bisset Boehmke McBlain.

== Personal ==
Bisset married Henrietta Katherine Tait and the couple had six children – four daughters (Islay Kathleen, Gwendolyn, Helen and Betty) and two sons (William Murray and Eldred). In 1902 he bought the house St James Manor in St James, Cape Town and lived there until 1912. He then settled with his family at Aboyne House in Kenilworth, Cape Town and died in 1958 at the age of 90.

== See also ==
- List of South Africa national rugby union players – Springbok no. 8
