= Gillion Bosman =

South African politician

Gillion Bosman MPP
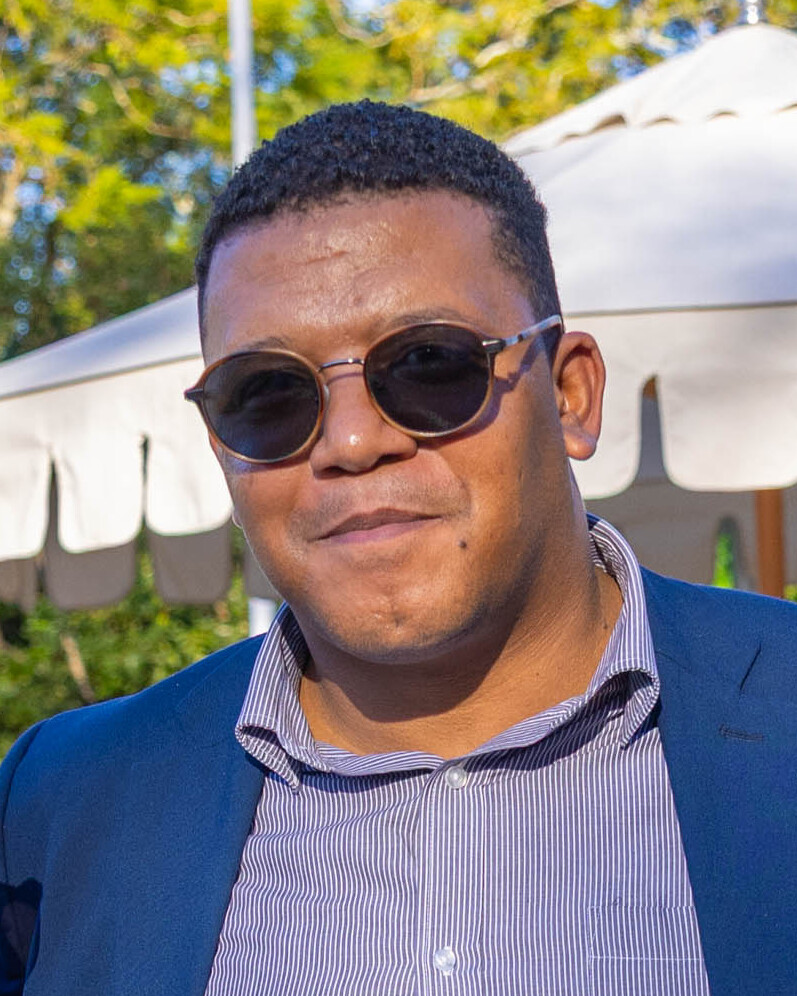
- Bosman in 2025

Member of the Western Cape Provincial Parliament
- Incumbent
- Assumed office 22 May 2019
- Constituency: Kannaland

Personal details
- Born: Gillion Bosman; 1987 or 1988 (age 38–39) Cape Flats, Cape Town, Cape Province, South Africa
- Party: Democratic Alliance
- Education: University of Cape Town
- Occupation: Politician

Gillion Bosman (born 1987/88) is a South African politician serving as both the chairperson of the Standing Committee on Social Development and the Petitions Committee in the Western Cape Provincial Parliament since June 2019. He became a member of the provincial parliament in May 2019 following the 2019 general election. He had formerly served as a municipal councillor of the City of Cape Town from August 2016 to May 2019. Bosman is a member of the governing Democratic Alliance.

== Life and career ==
Bosman was born on the Cape Flats in Cape Town. He studied at the University of Cape Town where he obtained a degree in political science and public administration. He currently resides in Wynberg.

Prior to his entry into politics, he was involved in the community development field. He was listed as one of the Mail & Guardian 200 Young South Africans in civil society in 2012. In 2014, he was selected to be part of the inaugural class of the Young African Leadership Initiative Washington Fellowship Programme. He worked as the Executive Director for Youth End Poverty until 2016.

In May 2016, the Democratic Alliance announced their councillor candidates for the City of Cape Town prior to the August 2016 national municipal elections. Bosman placed 14th on the proportional representation list. He was elected and took office as a councillor on 11 August 2016. He was assigned to ward 13 and ward 71.

Ahead of the May 2019 general election, Bosman placed 25th on the Democratic Alliance's candidate list for the Western Cape Provincial Parliament. The Democratic Alliance won 24 seats, initially declining him a seat. Provincial minister Donald Grant opted against serving in the provincial parliament to become Premier Alan Winde's adviser. Bosman was named his replacement and filled the seat on 22 May 2019. In June 2019, he was elected chairperson of both the Standing Committee on Social Development and the Petitions Committee by the respective committees.
