= Dutch Reformed Church, Wynberg =

Church in Wynberg, Cape Town, South Africa

Coordinates: 34°0′16.8″S 18°27′44.4″E

Dutch Reformed Church
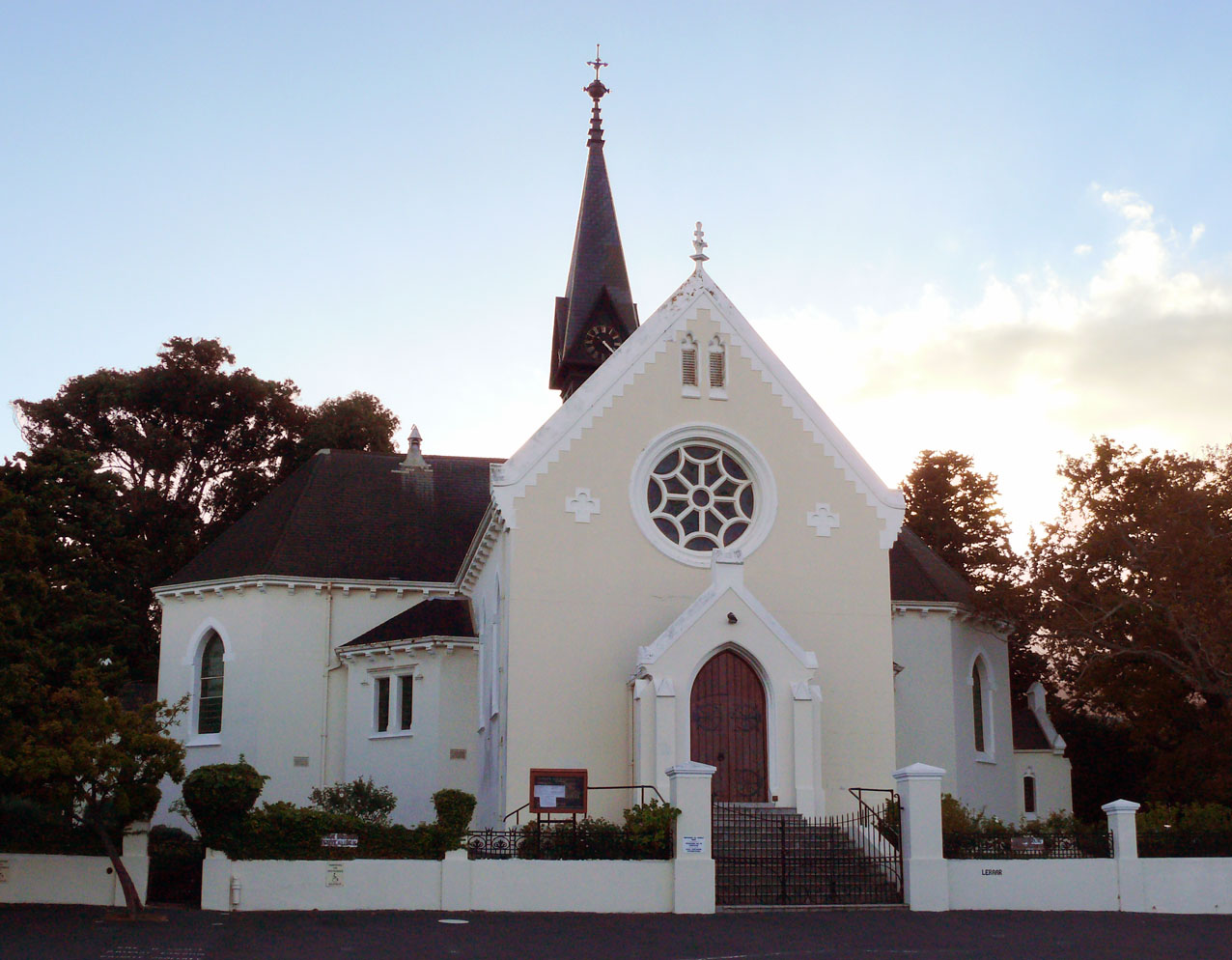
- Dutch Reformed Church
- Location: Cape Town
- Country: South Africa
- Denomination: Nederduits Gereformeerde Kerk

History
- Founded: 1829

Architecture
- Functional status: Church

The Dutch Reformed Church in Wynberg is the 20th oldest Dutch Reformed Church congregation in the former Cape Province and the third oldest in the Cape Town metropolitan area, after the Groote Kerk (1665) and the Durbanville Dutch Reformed Church congregation (1826). Dr. Abraham van der Merwe, then moderator of the Cape Church, described Wynberg in 1954 on the congregation's 125th anniversary as "the oldest suburban congregation in the Cape Church"; therefore also in the entire Dutch Reformed Church.

The congregation was founded on 20 September 1829 when the first religious service was held under the leadership of the consultant, Dr. Abraham Faure, on the farm De Onder Schuur, later the official residence Westbrooke (since 1995 officially Genadendal), at that time the property of Mr. Egbert Andries Buyskes. This historic residence is currently located within the boundaries of the Dutch Reformed congregation Rondebosch. The first chief justice of the Cape Colony, Sir John Truter, is considered the father and founder of the congregation. The first church building was consecrated on 30 September 1832 and 10 years later enlarged by the addition of two wings. The enlarged church building was demolished in 1897 to make way for the present church building, which was consecrated on 17 March 1899.

The first pastor was Rev. (later Dr.) Philip Eduard Faure, a brother of the consultant, who was confirmed on 7 December 1834. He served the congregation until his death on 7 December 1882. After Dr. Faure's death, English services were introduced, but were abolished again in 1912. Members of the congregation helped establish at least two Afrikaans-medium schools within the congregation's boundaries, the Simon van der Stel Primary School and the Voortrekker High School, Kenilworth. Due to the changing demographics of the southern suburbs, the number of learners at Simon van der Stel, which remained Afrikaans, fell to below 200 in 2006 and stood at 182 (gr. 1 – 7) in 2016, the same as in 2010, while Voortrekker became a parallel medium to maintain its numbers and Afrikaans was gradually phased out.

== Ministers ==
- Philip Eduard Faure (1834–1882).
- Pieter Adam Strasheim (1883–1895).
- Adriaan Jacobus Louw Hofmeyr (1895–1899).
- Daniel Jozua Pienaar (1900–1904).
- Johan Gysbert Cornelis de Bruyn (1905–1910).
- Hendrik Jacobus Pienaar (1911–1914).
- George Frederick Charles Faustmann (1915–1931).
- Francois Stephanus Malan, 1931–1952.
- Michiel Daniel Victor Cloete, 1946–1950 (Military Camp) and 1952–1960 (Military Camp).
- David Willem Krynauw, 1946–1950.
- Lodewikus Lourens Johannes Visser, 1950–1962.
- Lodewyk Petrus Arnoldus Spies, 1953–1955.
- Johannes George Fourie van Rooyen, 1956–1957, 1957 – 27 June 1971.
- Henry Charles Hopkins, 1961–1974.
- Albrecht Scheurkogel, 1963–1968.
- Johannes Daniël Smith, 1966–1970.
- Frederik Malherbe Gaum, 1969–1971.
- Christeman Joël Andries Greyling, 1969–1977 (from 1971 with assignment mission among Muslims)
- Christian Beyers Roelofse, 1969–1976.
- Johannes Jacobus Mulder Raubenheimer, 1971–1975
- Johannes Jacobus Smit, 1973–1976.
- Daniël Johannes Louw, 1972–1976.
- Gideon Stephanus Boshoff, 1975 (chaplain, SADF).
- Burger Wynand Gilomee du Toit, 6 May 1977 – 22 July 1988.
- Casparus Johannes Carstens, 1981–1984.
- Johannes Christoffel Els, 1985–1989 (goes to Radio Pulpit).
- Peter Daniel Victor, 1985–1996
- Daniel Theodorus Nel, 1990–present.

== Sources ==
- (in Afrikaans) Dreyer, eerw. A. 1929. Kerksouvenir van Wynberg, Gemeente-Eeuwfeest 1829–1929. Kaapstad, Stellenbosch en Bloemfontein: Nasionale Pers Beperk.
- (in Afrikaans) Dreyer, eerw. A. 1932. Jaarboek van die Nederduits-Gereformeerde Kerke in Suid-Afrika vir die jaar 1933, Kaapstad: Jaarboek-Kommissie van die Raad van die Kerke.
- (in Afrikaans) Gaum, dr. Frits (red.) 1989. Jaarboek van die Nederduitse Gereformeerde Kerke 1990. Pretoria: Tydskriftemaatskappy van die Nederduitse Gereformeerde Kerk.
- (in Afrikaans) Maree, W.L. (red.). 1978. Jaarboek van die Nederduitse Gereformeerde Kerke 1979. Braamfontein: Tydskriftemaatskappy van die Nederduitse Gereformeerde Kerk.
- (in Afrikaans) Olivier, ds. P.L. (samesteller). 1952. Ons gemeentelike feesalbum. Kaapstad en Pretoria: N.G. Kerk-Uitgewers.
- (in English) Potgieter, D.J. (red.) 1972. Standard Encyclopaedia of Southern Africa. Cape Town: Nasionale Opvoedkundige Uitgewery (Nasou).
