= J. J. L. Smuts =

Mayor of Cape Town
- In office 1844–1848
- Preceded by: Michiel van Breda
- Succeeded by: Hercules Crosse Jarvis

Personal details
- Born: Johannes Joachim Lodewyk Smuts; 9 July 1785 Cape Town, Dutch Cape Colony
- Died: 1 August 1869 (aged 84) Gardens, Cape Town, Cape Colony
- Spouse(s): Cornelia Gerherdina Fleck; Esther Elizabeth de Wet; Maria de Villiers; Margaretha Anna Fough
- Children: 1

Johannes Joachim Lodewyk Smuts (9 July 1785 – 1 August 1869) was a public official in Cape Colony, businessman and the second Mayor of Cape Town.

Smuts was married to Maria de Villiers, widow of Pieter Woutersen, who erected the Woutersen Wessels Vault in Green Point.

== Biography ==
Smuts was born in Cape Town, the son of Johannes Smuts and Magdalena Elisabeth Wernich. He worked as Secretary to the Orphan-Chamber in Cape Town. The function of the Orphan-Chamber was, among other things, to administer the estates of persons dying intestate in the Colony and among whose heirs there were minors or persons residing abroad; the registration of wills of deceased persons; the administration of minors' property and keeping a death register or record of persons who died at the Cape. After his time with the Orphan-Chamber he worked for some time in the Colonial Office and also held the office of Receiver General of Land Revenue.

During the 1830s Smuts worked as a moneylender and by the middle of the 1830s, with the emancipation of slaves, he acted as the moneylender for his countrymen on the security of slaves. Smuts was also a member of the slave compensation board and acted with Hamilton Ross, as an agent for the payment of compensation money to former slaveowners. He managed to build up a substantial property portfolio and in 1842, owned 22 properties in Cape Town.

In 1844, Smuts succeeded Michiel van Breda as chairman of the Municipal Board of Cape Town, which was effectively the role of Mayor and during his term, in 1847, Cape Town was constituted a city in terms of letters patent granted by Privy Seal. Smuts retired as chairman in 1848. He lived in Cape Town all his life and died on 1 August 1869 at his house, Zorgwyk, in Gardens, Cape Town.

Zorgwyk is today one of the last original surviving original farm homesteads in the Upper Table Valley, and was declared a National Monument in 1985.
