= Wynberg Military Base =

- Cape Town, South Africa
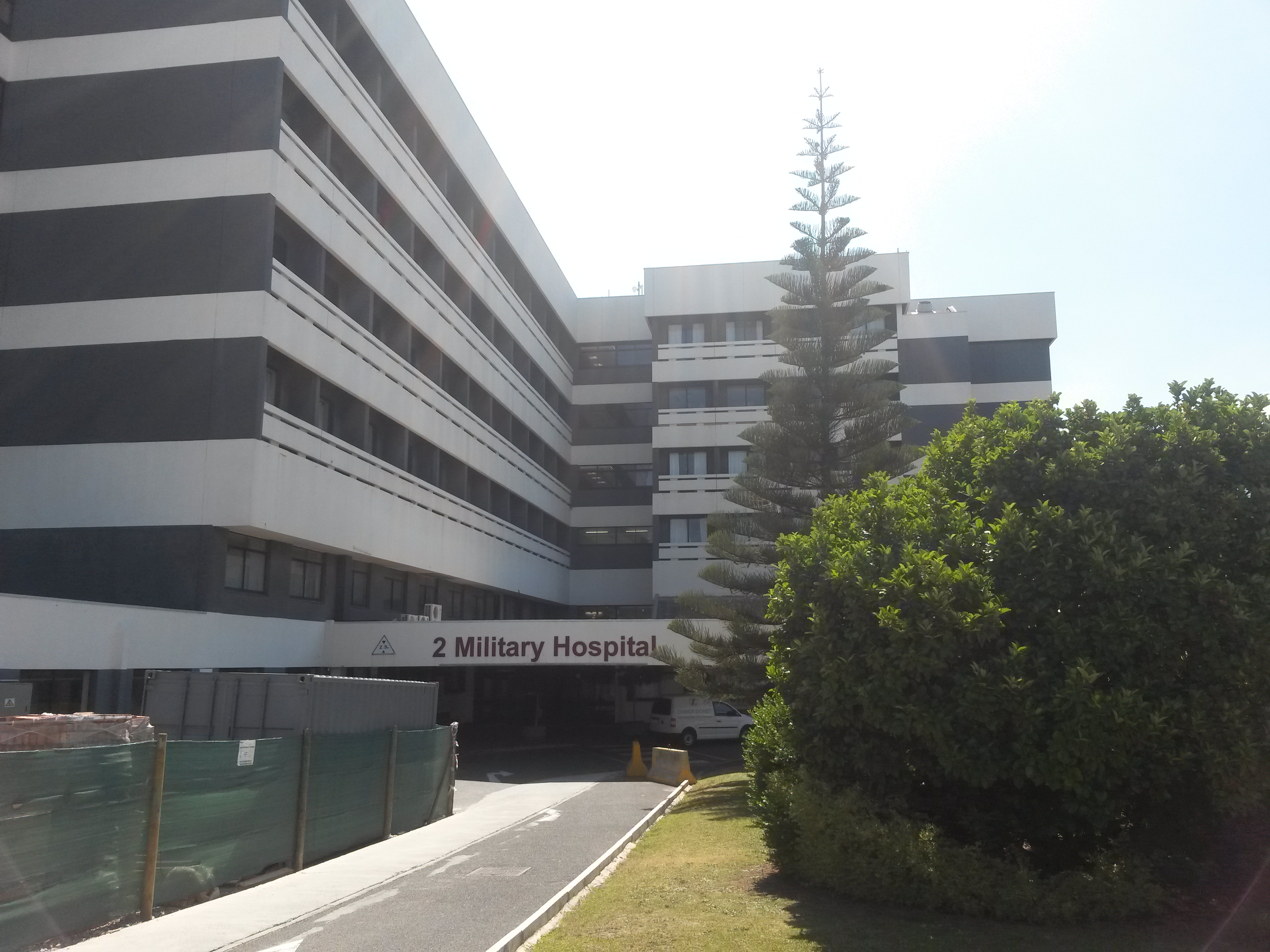
- 2 Military Hospital located within the Wynberg Military Base.

Site information
- Type: Military base
- Controlled by: 1797–1802: United Kingdom; 1804–1806: Batavian Republic; 1806–1910: United Kingdom; 1910–present: South Africa

Location
- Coordinates: 34.006°S 18.458°E

Site history
- Built: 1804
- In use: 1804-1816: Garrison camp; 1859-1899: Garrison camp; 1899–1904: Military hospital; 1914-1918: Training grounds & hospital; 1918-present: Military hospital

Wynberg Military Base is an army post in South Africa. It is located in the suburb of Wynberg, Cape Town in the Western Cape Province. Its hosts 2 Military Hospital and the Wynberg Military Base Sports Stadium. The Victorian era Officers Club at the base was declared a national monument in 1968.

During the first British invasion of the Cape a British camp was briefly established at the location of the base in 1797 due to its equidistant location between Table Bay to its north and False Bay to is south. During this period the camp briefly served as the headquarters Cape Corps. A farm owned by Alexander Tennant was purchased and a more permanent base established in 1804.

It was again taken over by the British following their second successful invasion of the Cape in 1806 and remained an important British military installation until it was handed over to the newly formed Union of South Africa in 1910. During this period the 59th Regiment (2nd East Lancashire), part of the Cape garrison, was stationed at the base in 1806, from 1859 to 1861, and from 1911 to 1914. Between 1816 and 1859 the base (then a camp) fell into a state of disrepair and remained undeveloped until the 1880s. By 1886 the base was occupied by over 1,800 officers and men with stabling for roughly 300 horses.

In 1899 the base was declared a military hospital eight weeks after the start of the Second Boer War, acting as an important military installation for the rest of the war. During the war No.1 and No 2 Military Hospitals were established at the base with over 1,000 beds for patients between both hospitals. Following the outbreak of World War I the 1st, 2nd, and 3rd South African Mounted Rifles received training at the base and it remained an important military hospital. During World War II the base was primarily used as a military medical centre.

During the later part of the South African Border War No. 1 Hospital was demolished and replaced by 2 Military Hospital.
