= Archibald Difford =

South African cricketer and South African Army officer

Personal information
- Full name: Archibald Newcombe Difford
- Born: 9 April 1883; Cape Town, Cape Colony
- Died: 20 September 1918 (aged 35); Kh Jibeit, Ottoman Syria
- Role: Batsman
- Relatives: Ivor Difford (brother); Murray Bisset (brother-in-law)

Domestic team information
- Years: Team
- 1904/05–1907/08: Western Province
- 1908/09–1911/12: Transvaal

Career statistics
Competition	First-class
Matches	16
Runs scored	824
Batting average	29.42
100s/50s	1/6
Top score	103
Balls bowled	54
Wickets	2
Bowling average	16.00
5 wickets in innings	–
10 wickets in match	–
Best bowling	1/13
Catches/stumpings	8/–
- Source: Cricinfo, 30 March 2021

Archibald Newcombe Difford (9 April 1883 – 20 September 1918) was a South African first-class cricketer and South African Army officer.

The son of Abraham Difford, he was born at Cape Town in April 1883. He was educated at Diocesan College, where he was regarded as academically gifted.

Described by Wisden as "a useful cricketer", Difford made his debut in first-class cricket for Western Province against Eastern Province in the quarter-final of the 1904/05 Currie Cup. He played first-class cricket until the 1911/12 season, making eleven appearances for Western Province, in addition to four for Transvaal and one for The Rest. Playing primarily as a batsman, he scored 842 runs in sixteen first-class matches, making six fifties and one century, a score of 103 against Griqualand West. Difford also played rugby.

Difford married Katrina Wilhelmina van Lier Kuys in June 1913; they had two children. He served in the First World War with the South African Army, being commissioned in January 1917 as a temporary second lieutenant in the 1st Cape Corps. He was killed in action in Ottoman Palestine on 20 September 1918, during the Battle of Nablus. He was buried at the Jerusalem War Cemetery.

His brother Ivor and brother-in-law Murray Bisset both played first-class cricket. His name was memorialised by the Gauteng Cricket Board in 2000, with the erection of a Memorial Wall for Transvaal cricketers killed in the two world wars.
