= Alexander Tennant =

Alexander Tennant, born in Ochiltree, Ayrshire in 1772, was a leading British colonist in the Cape Colony of the Cape of Good Hope, an enterprising merchant, a brother to industrialist Charles Tennant and a friend of Robbie Burns.

== Early life ==
Alexander was the fourth son of John Tennant (1725-1810) and Margaret McClure (1738-1784). His father, a farmer, was well known in the industry. 'A worth, intelligent farmer, my father's friend and my own', was how Burns described the prolific John Tennant of Glenconner in a letter to his lover Clarinda, dated 2 March 1788. This work ethic was found throughout the family; his brother Charles becoming a highly successful industrialist, his brother William the Chaplain to the Honourable East India Company and a further brother, David, a noted privateer. In his Epistle to James Tennant of Glenconner, possibly referring to an entrepreneurial flair, Burns wrote of Alexander:

An’ Lord, remember singing Sannock, Wi’ hale breeks, saxpence, an’ a bannock! , loosely translating to And Lord, remember singing Alexander, With whole trousers, sixpence and a bannock!

== Cape Colony ==
Around 1795 Alexander embarked on a voyage to visit his clergyman brother, William Tennant (1758-1813), in India. His brother was emerging as one of the foremost experts on the sub-continent, a reputation cemented by the publication of Indian Recreations in 1808. Spotting opportunities in the Cape during his journey, Alexander remained there and took up a partnership with Donald Trail. The firm of Tennant and Trail then set about transporting convicts to Australia as well as moving slaves from Mozambique to be sold at the Cape to members of the Dutch East India Company (VOC). These dealings were frequently on the very edge of legality and it was alleged that, following the British Slave Trade Act 1807, Tennant used a Portuguese flag to further his business. The Governor of the Cape, General Baird, had agreed to allow the sale of several hundred slaves before abolition but as Tennant took delivery after that date many of those slaves were left to fend for themselves on Robben Island. In 1801 Tennant was involved in a High Court lawsuit over financial irregularities regarding ships that he had bought acting as middle man between a Brazilian merchant, Marcos da Costa Guimarains and Admiral Cornwallis, the British Commander in False Bay.

== Marriage and respectability ==
Despite the questionable business arrangements and practices of his youth, at the time of his death in 1814, Tennant had gained an air of respectability. He married Cornelia Sandenberg in 1796, a member of an established Dutch/Norwegian colonial family and had built up a considerable land holding in Wynberg. His wife bore him eight children, many of whom would go on to hold positions of authority in the fledgling British administration of the Cape. His son, Hercules, was a civil commissioner and magistrate for Uitenhage and wrote Tennant's Notary's Manual for the Cape of Good Hope. His grandson, Sir David Tennant, son of Hercules, was the Speaker of the Cape House of Assembly from 1874-1895.
