= Hercules Crosse Jarvis =

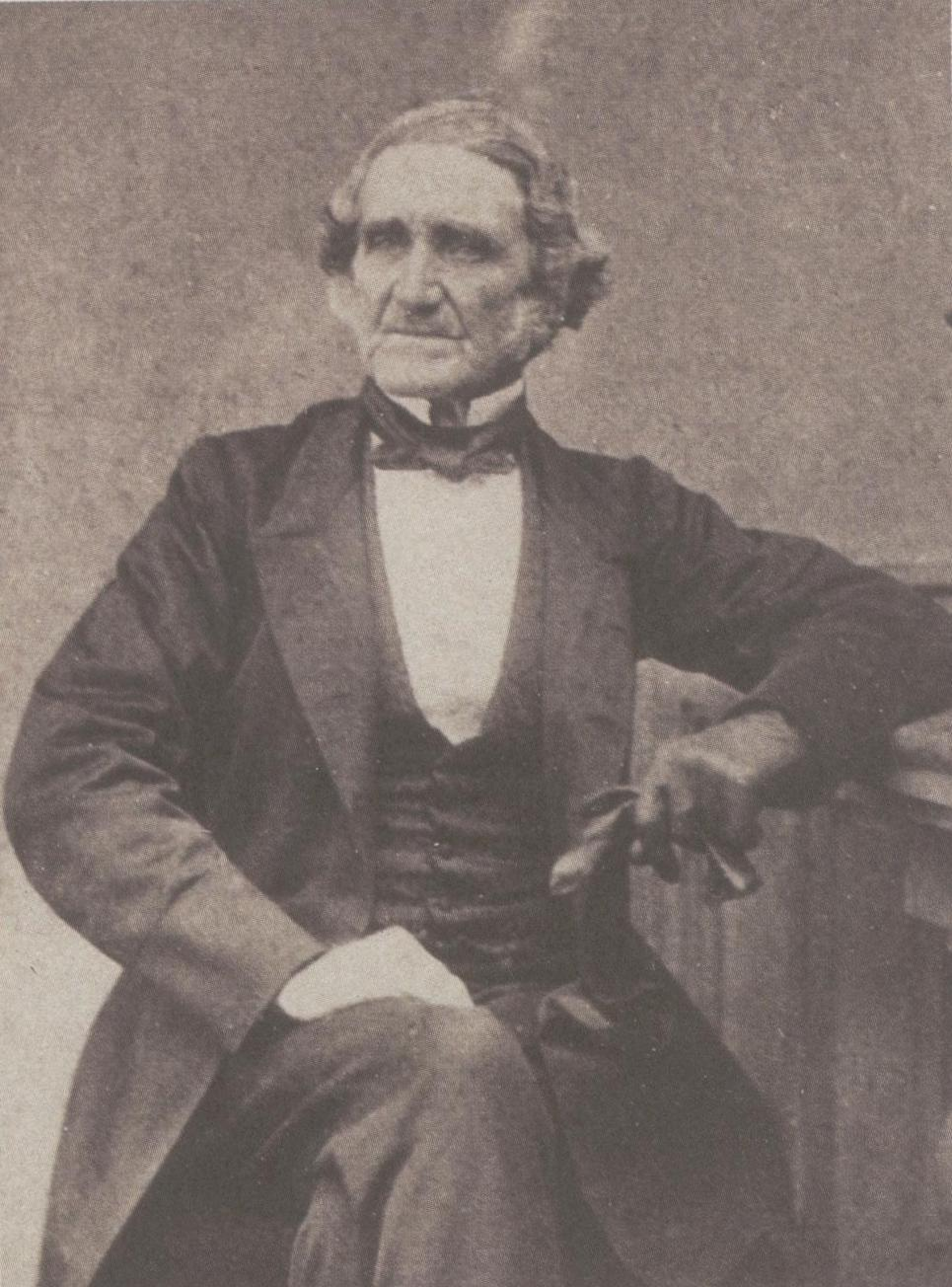
- A photograph of Hercules Crosse Jarvis in later life, as Mayor of Cape Town. Photograph from the Cape Archives.

Mayor of Cape Town
- In office 1848–1860
- Preceded by: J. J. L. Smuts
- Succeeded by: D. G. van Breda

Personal details
- Born: 18 June 1802 Plymouth, England
- Died: 8 February 1889 (aged 86) Claremont, Cape Town
- Resting place: St. Saviours Church, Claremont
- Spouse: Elizabeth Maria Vos
- Children: five daughters

Hercules Crosse Jarvis (18 June 1802 – 8 February 1889) MLC, MLA, was a mayor of Cape Town and a powerful merchant of the Cape Colony.

== Childhood ==
Born in Plymouth, England on 18 June 1802, he was a close relative of John Jervis, 1st Earl of St Vincent, the admiral who fought Napoleon. His father, also named John Jervis, was an army captain from Staffordshire who died young, leaving his wife and six children. Coming from an intensely military family, the 14-year-old Hercules Crosse was offered a commission in the army by his relative the Admiral of St Vincent, but he had other plans and turned the offer down. He was also of a very gentle and sensitive nature, and the idea of war deeply repelled him.

After briefly visiting the Cape in 1816, he decided to move to the colony permanently, and arrived in Cape Town in 1821 with the intention of settling and making his fortune.

== Early life in Cape Town ==
Soon after moving to Cape Town, he found a job as a clerk in the trading firm Hudson, Donaldson & Dixon and worked his way up to being its manager - a position he held throughout his life until he retired from business in 1864. He was enormously influential in starting and developing the Cape's wine exports, and founded a distillery for that purpose in the vicinity of Paarl. He came to have a presence in many of the Cape's institutions, including directorship in Mutual Life (1846), the Union Bank (1847), the Harbour Board and even the South African College (1860). He was also a veteran member of the Cape Town Commercial Exchange.

== Family ==
Jarvis married an Afrikaans woman, Elizabeth Maria Vos, joining the local Dutch Reformed Church (where he was later made an Elder) in order to do so. He was aged 19 at the time, and she was only 16. They had five daughters. One of them, Elizabeth Maria, met and married the young John Charles Molteno, who was later to become the Cape's first Prime Minister. Another daughter, Elizabeth Magdalena Christina ("Betty") married the Wynberg Mayor James Bisset and was mother to the Governor and cricketer Sir Murray Bisset. A third daughter, Sophia St Ives married the influential Cape businessman and exporter Percy John Allport. Anne Jarvis married the widower and Indian army officer Major William Bazett Gordon Blenkins C.B. The youngest daughter Emmie never married.

== Political career ==
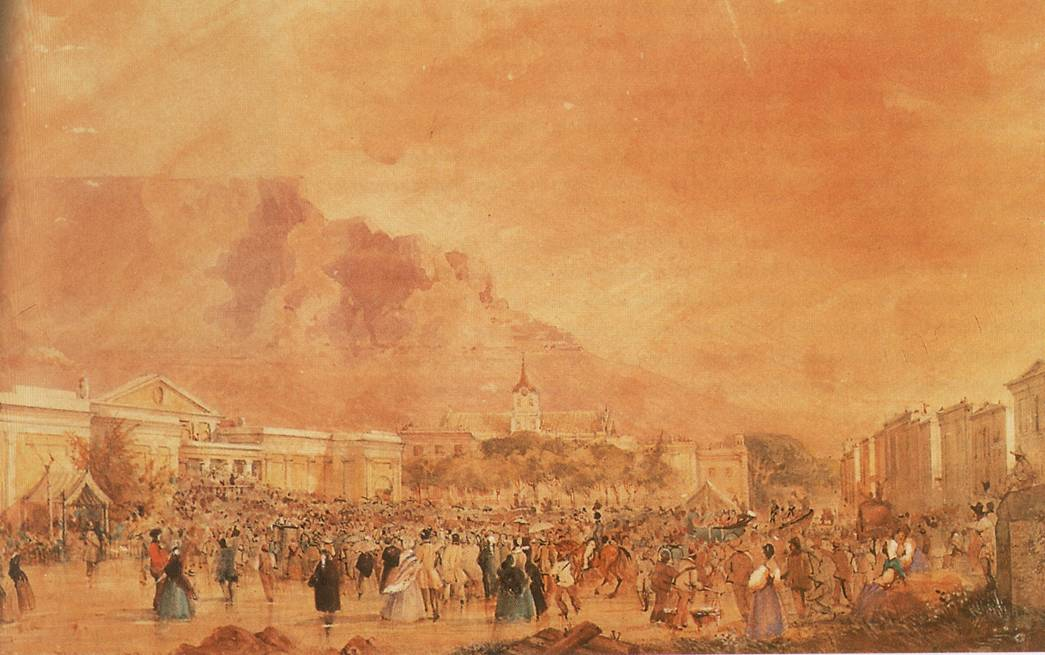
A 19th Century depiction of the speeches and public debates on the Convict Crisis in Cape Town, 1849

Hercules Crosse became a prominent fighter for the establishment of a representative Cape parliament, and when it was finally created he took a seat as the first minister to stand for Cape Town. In addition, the city of Cape Town was set up with a Board of Commissioners (later, Municipal Council) in 1840 and Jarvis was immediately elected onto it, soon becoming its chairman. He had particularly good relations with the Cape Malay community of Cape Town, and throughout his political career he derived a good deal of his political support from this important voting bloc.

He went on to become mayor and first citizen of Cape Town from 1848 to 1861, making him the longest serving of any first citizen of Cape Town. As mayor, Jarvis was responsible for much of the early development of Cape Town's infrastructure. He drew up the plans for the city's first breakwater and harbour, and was a member of the Harbour Board for forty years.

He was an impartial and influential spokesman of the city during the Anti-Convict Movement (1848–1850), holding public meetings and presiding over debates. This local movement had developed in response to an attempt by the British government to turn the Cape Colony into a penal colony. In the end, it was Jarvis' resolutions on the matter that ended up being conveyed to the Governor and the Queen. He subsequently suggested a renaming of a portion of the Heerengracht to "Adderley Street" - now the central street of the Cape Town CBD - after the man who had championed the opinion of the Cape citizens in the House of Commons.

In the 1860s he joined the growing movement for Responsible government that was led by his son-in-law John Molteno.

== Later life ==
The Cape's economy was in a severely depressed state in the 1860s, and Jarvis's vast business interests were one of the many victims of this economic stagnation. Once the leading wine merchant in the country, he eventually declared bankruptcy in 1864 and, already elderly, never completely recovered financially, even in the country's 1870s economic boom. He sold his Somerset Road house and moved in with the extended family of his son-in-law John Molteno, in Claremont. In later life, he took an avid interest in mining. He unsuccessfully prospected for coal in the Cape Town City Bowl area, before setting up a Manganese mining venture outside Paarl.

He died at the house of his daughter Sophia St Ives Mary Alport, in Claremont, Cape Town, in 1889 and was buried beside his wife at Claremont St. Saviours Church.

Political offices
Preceded by J. J. L. Smuts	Mayor of Cape Town; 1848–1860	Succeeded by D. G. van Breda
Preceded by Office created	Representative of Cape Town; 1854–1858	Succeeded by ???
Preceded by ???	Member of the Legislative Council (Western Province); 1859–1863	Succeeded by ???
