= James Bisset (mayor) =

Scottish-born South African architect and mayor

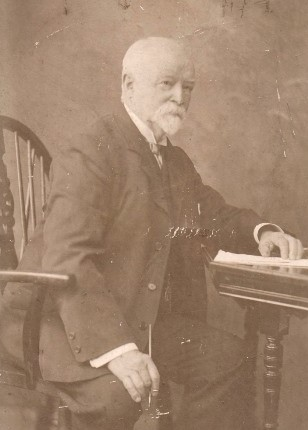
Cllr James Bisset in later life

James Bisset (14th October, 1836 – 8th October, 1919) was an architect and civil engineer of the Cape Colony, responsible for many of the Cape's early buildings and communications infrastructure. He was also Mayor of Wynberg, South Africa.

== Early life ==
James Bisset was born in 1836 in Aberdeen, Scotland, son of a City Councillor and Master of Mortifications William Bisset and his wife Margaret. He was one of 6 brothers and 3 sisters. He trained as an engineer at London University and did his early work on Crystal Palace, Sydenham station as well as a range of railway projects and public buildings around Europe.

== Early work in the Cape ==
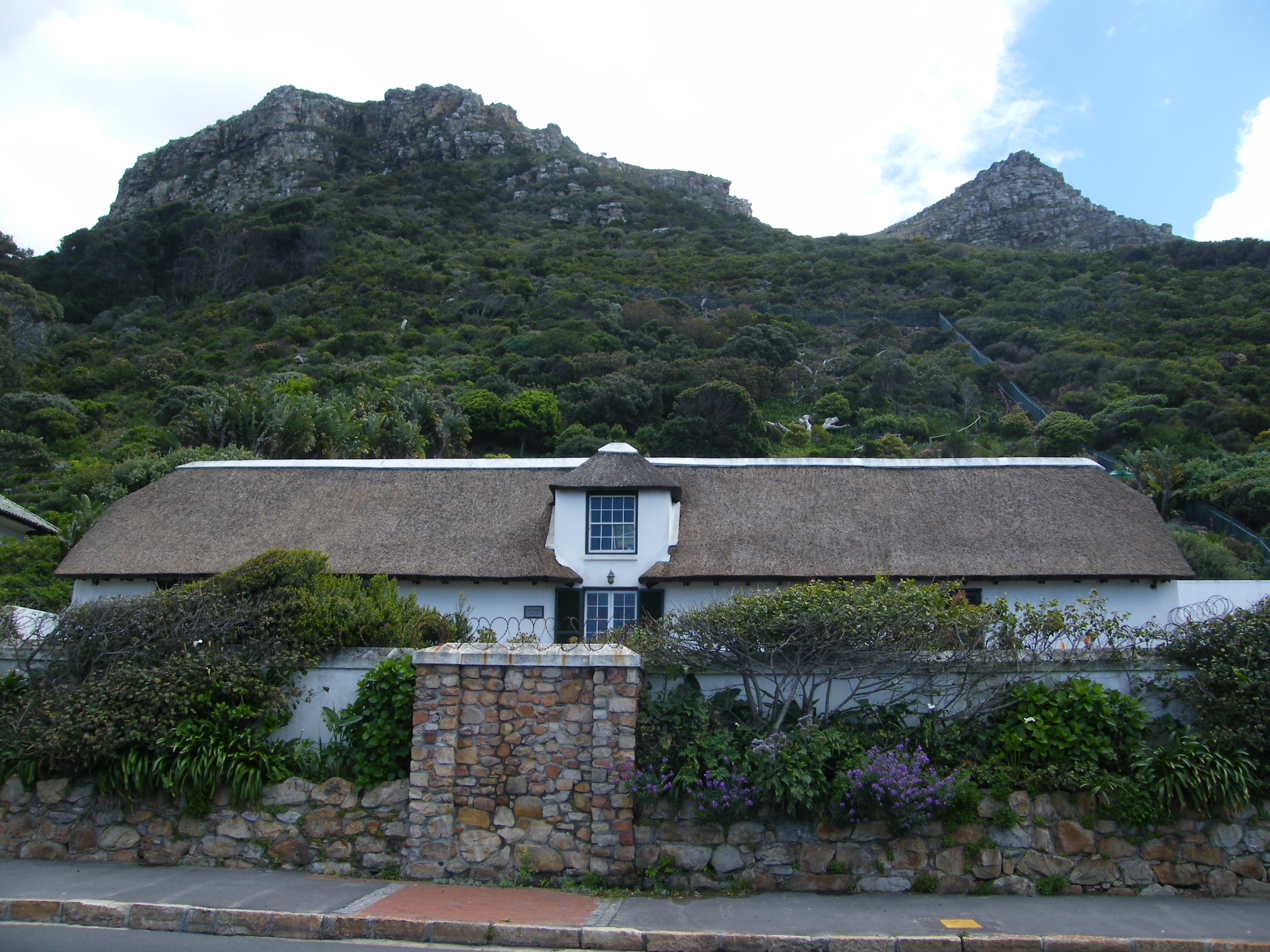
Bisset's "Long Cottage" on Main Road, Muizenberg, Cape Town

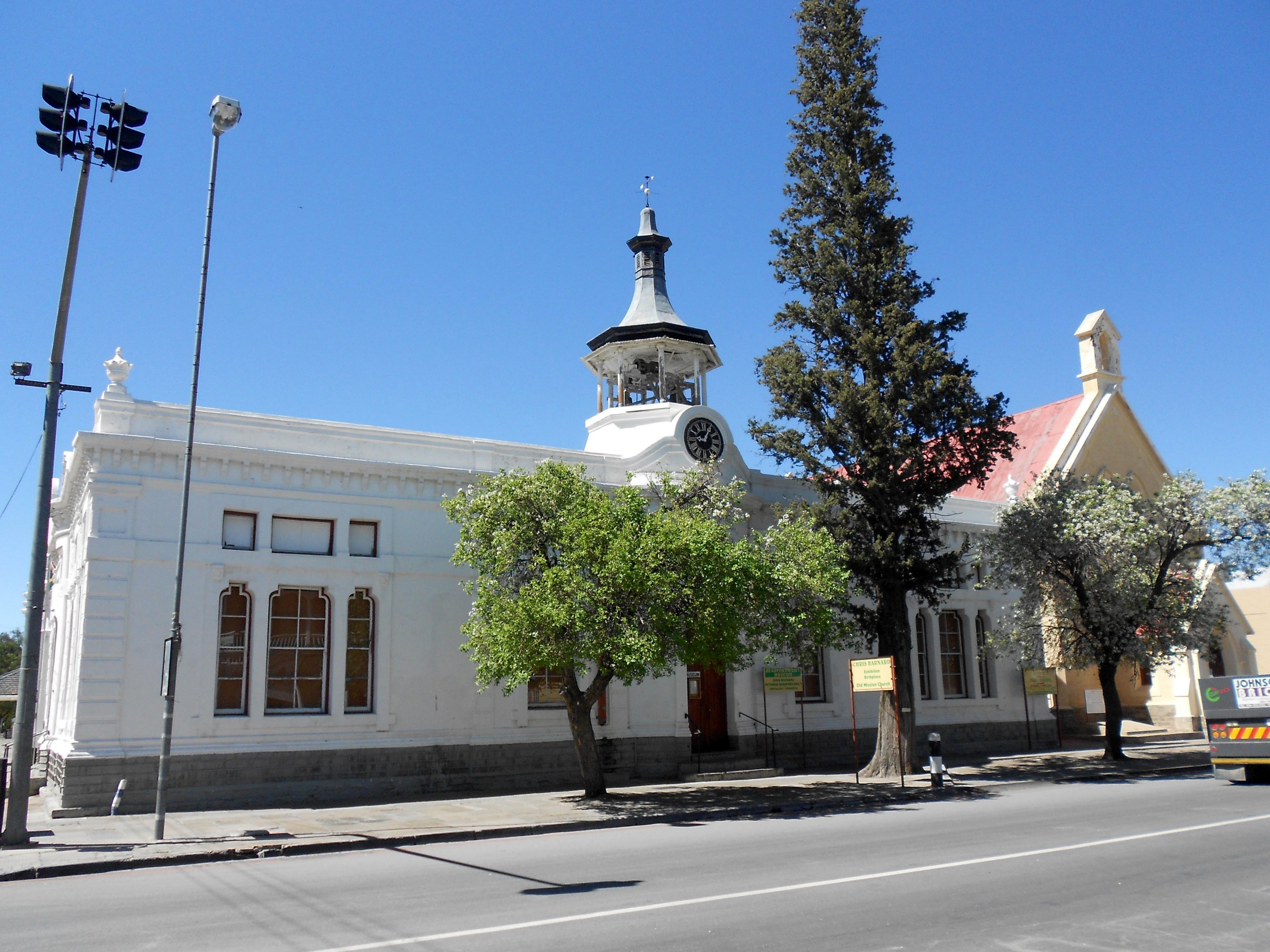
Beaufort West's Town Hall, an early work of James Bisset.

In 1858 he was sent to the Cape, aged 22, to begin work on its first railway, for the infant Cape Railway and Dock Company (later to become the Cape Government Railways). This railway stretched from Cape Town to Wellington, and his team began work on it on 31 March, 1859. Another section was built from Cape Town to Wynberg. In 1861 he worked on construction of Cape Town's tramways, including the line to Sea point, (originally horse-drawn) with the "Green Point Tramway Company". He later also completed a similar project for Port Elizabeth.

During this time, he also worked on a range of architectural and engineering projects throughout the Cape, including the old Mutual Assurance building in Cape Town, Dutch Reformed Churches and several other buildings in Beaufort West, Graaff-Reinet and Somerset East, as well as the Town Hall and principal churches of Port Elizabeth.

== Cape government railways ==
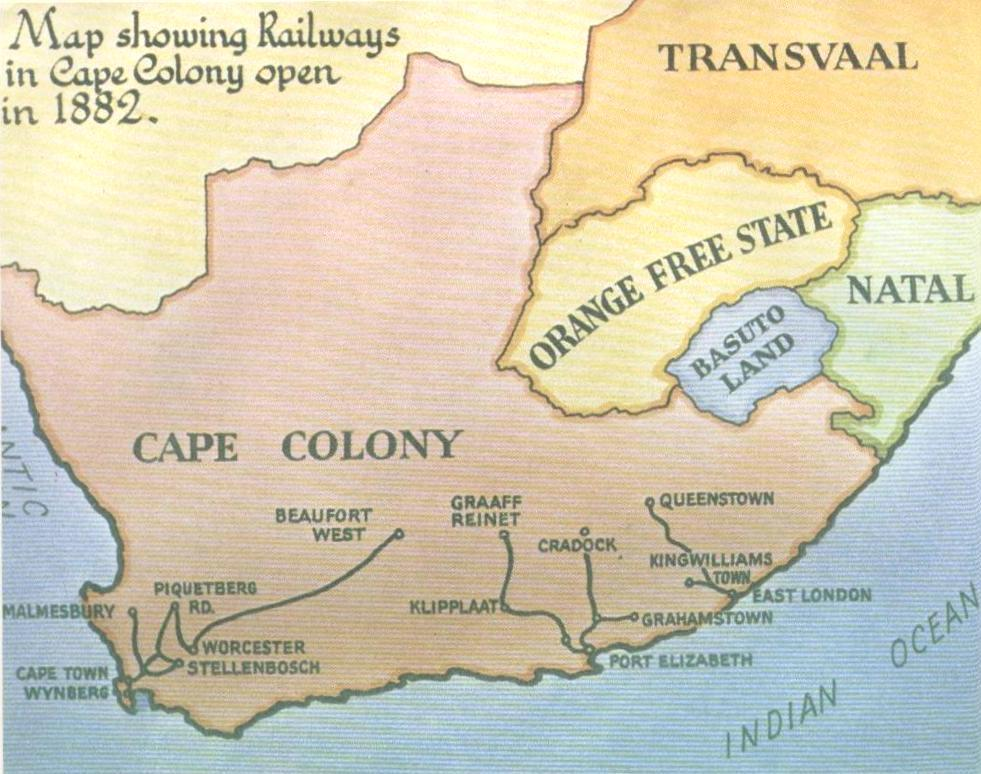
The Cape Government Railways in 1882.

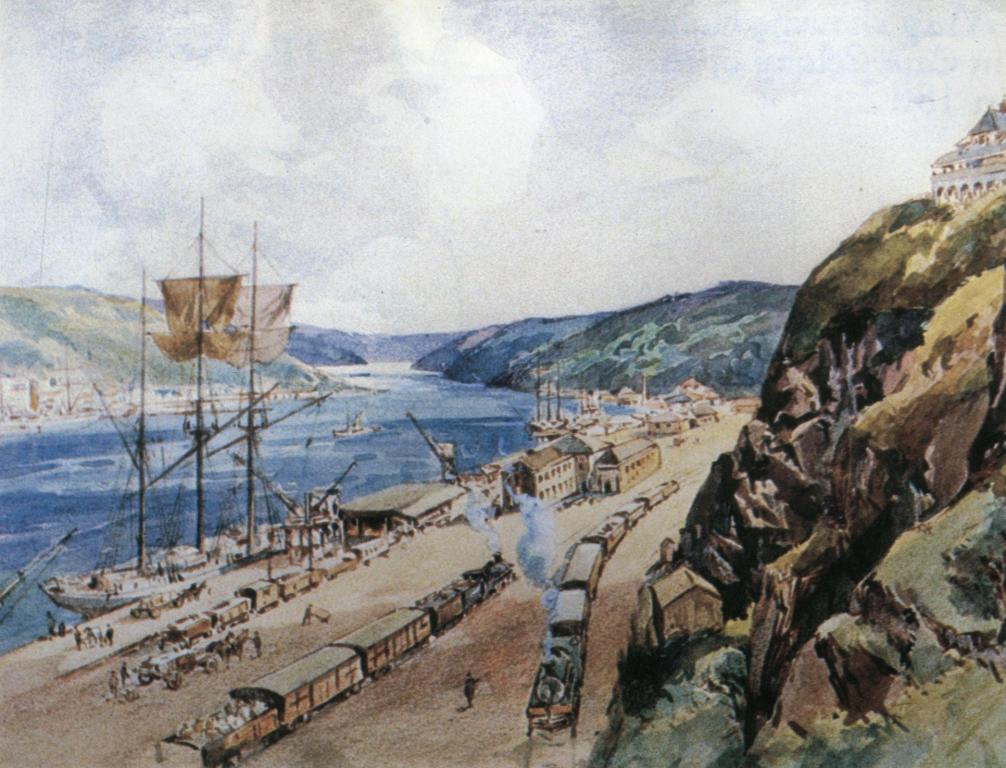
The first railway line in East London.

In 1872, the Cape attained a degree of independence from Britain and its first Prime Minister, John Molteno, driving a massive expansion in the Cape's economic infrastructure, consolidated the country's railway lines into the Cape Government Railways. The few existing rudimentary lines were to be turned into a nationwide network, connecting the country's ports to the diamond fields of Kimberley and the agricultural hinterland. James Bisset had played a significant part in deciding on the gauge to be used for the national railway system, and was involved in selecting Cape gauge for this purpose. He inaugurated and directed the first early railway line of the "Cape Midland Line", running from Port Elizabeth to Uitenhage. He was also appointed to lead construction of the "Cape Eastern Line", running from East London.

== Political career ==
Bisset typically pursued several simultaneous occupations throughout his career. He served in the Anglo-Boer War and chaired the School, Municipal and Hospital Boards.

He was a councillor for Liesbeeck Municipality (1883–1886), Mayor of Wynberg (1886, 1893) and briefly Mayor of Claremont.

While Mayor of Wynberg, he obtained the grant of land for what became Wynberg Park. He also succeeded in making Wynberg the first municipality in the greater Cape Peninsula area to get electric street lighting.

== Family and later life ==
Early in his career, on 16th October, 1862, he had married Elizabeth Magdalena Christina Jarvis, daughter of Cape Town Mayor Hercules Jarvis, and they had 6 sons and a daughter. One of his sons, Murray Bisset was a Test cricketer who captained South Africa before moving to Southern Rhodesia where he briefly served as Governor of Southern Rhodesia. Another was the international Rugby union player William Molteno "Bill" Bisset.

James Bisset died on 8th October, 1919 at Beauleigh, his house in Kenilworth, Cape Town.
