= Wynberg, Cape Town =

Wynberg
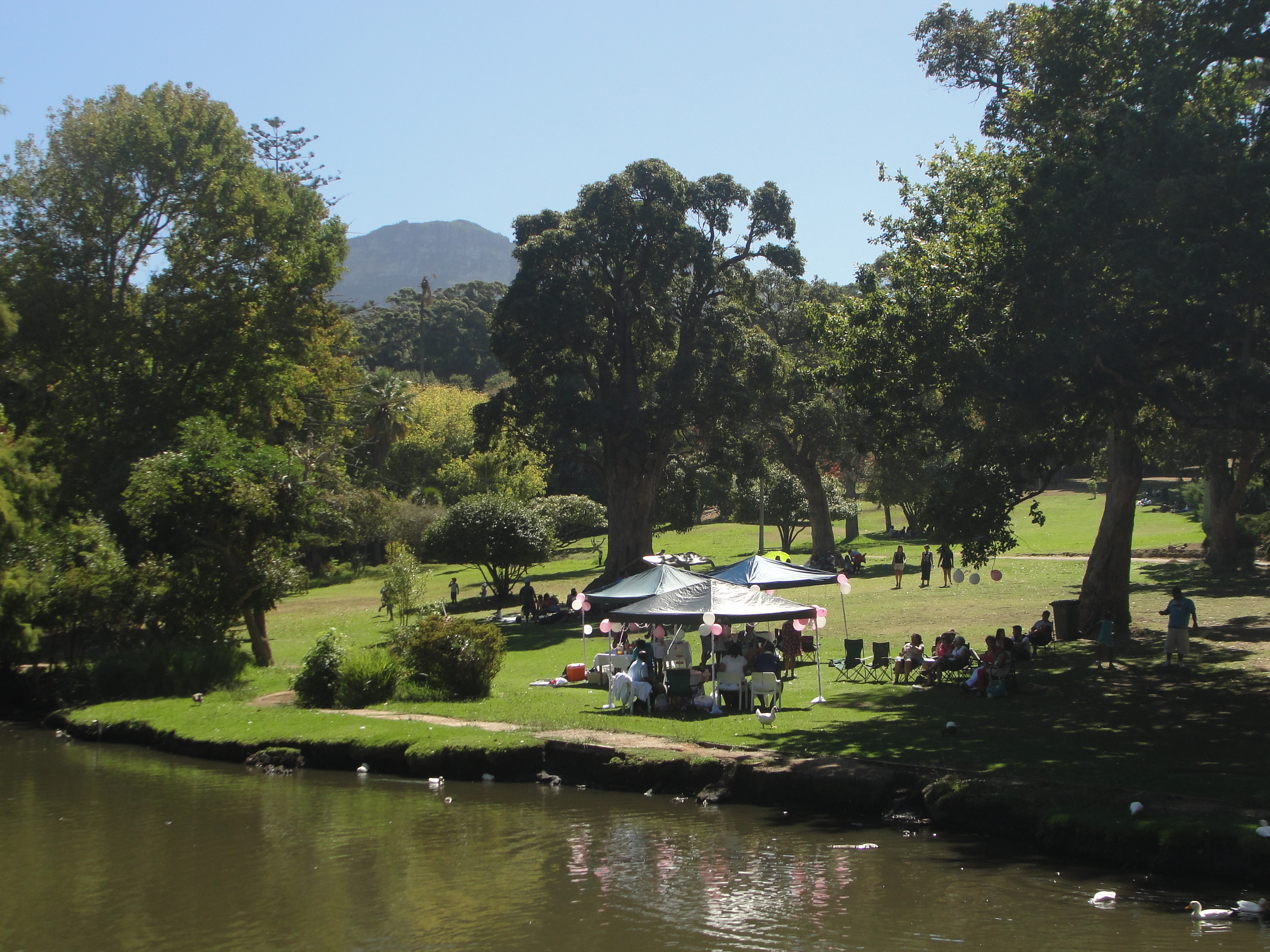
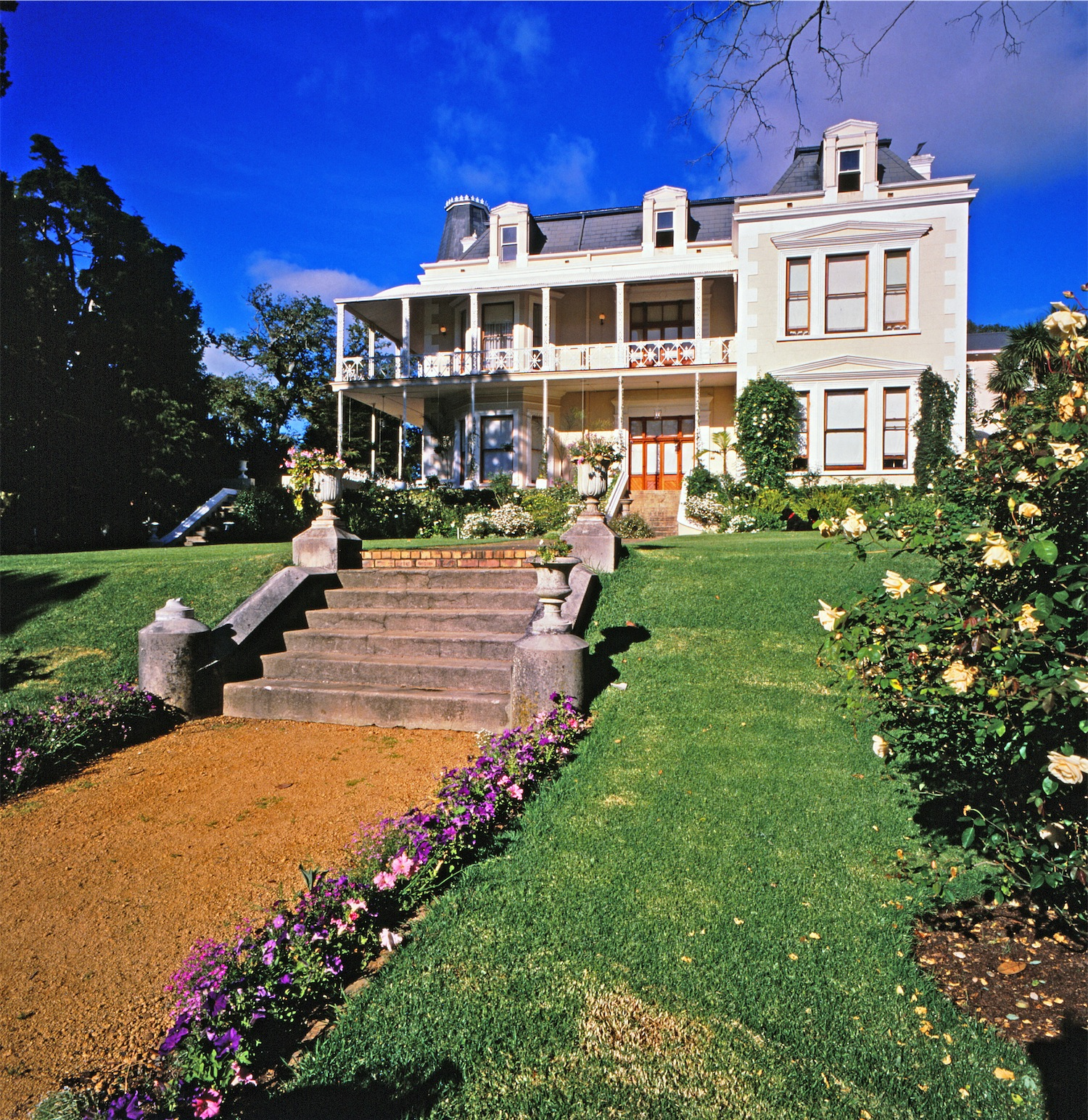
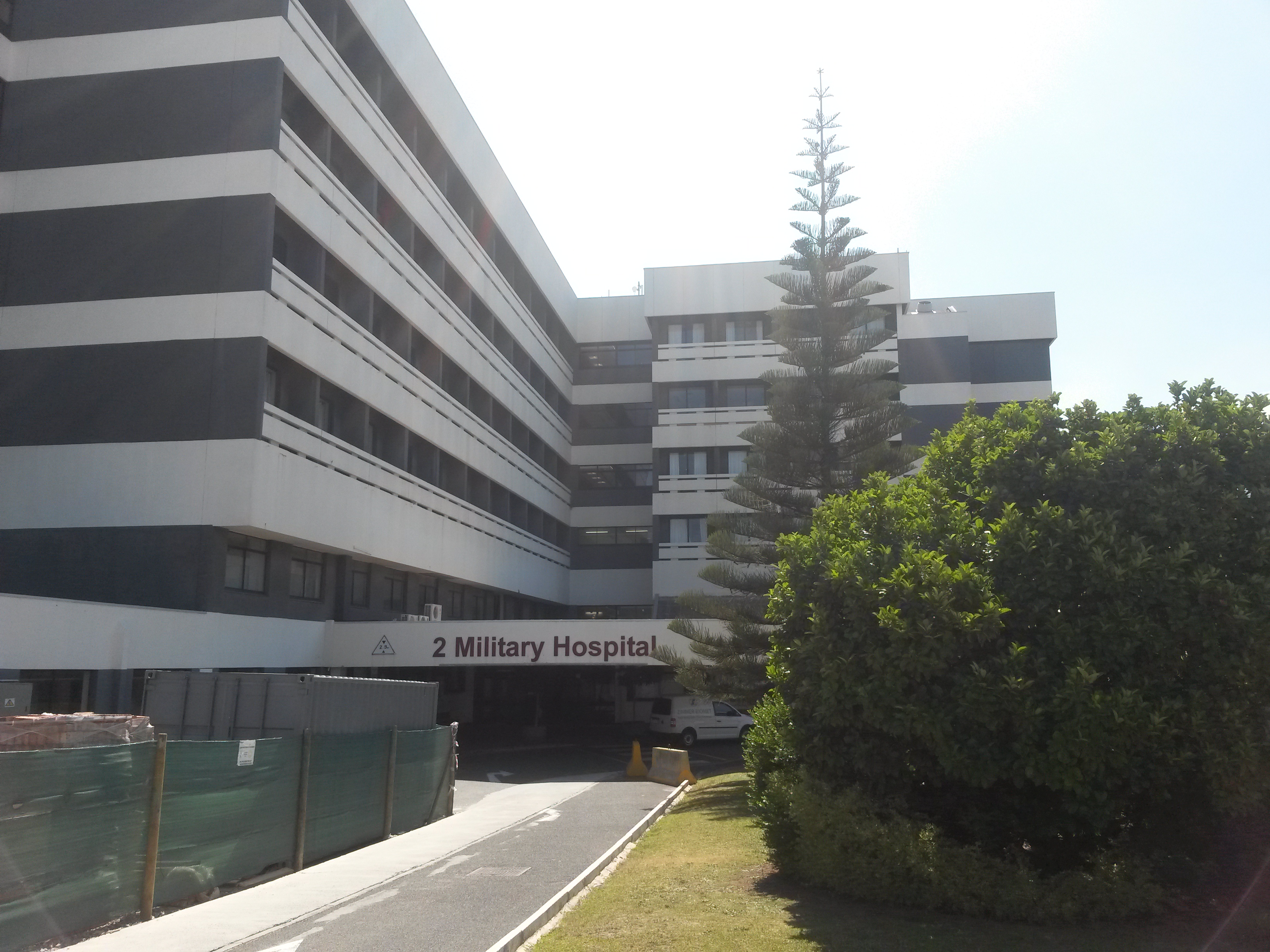
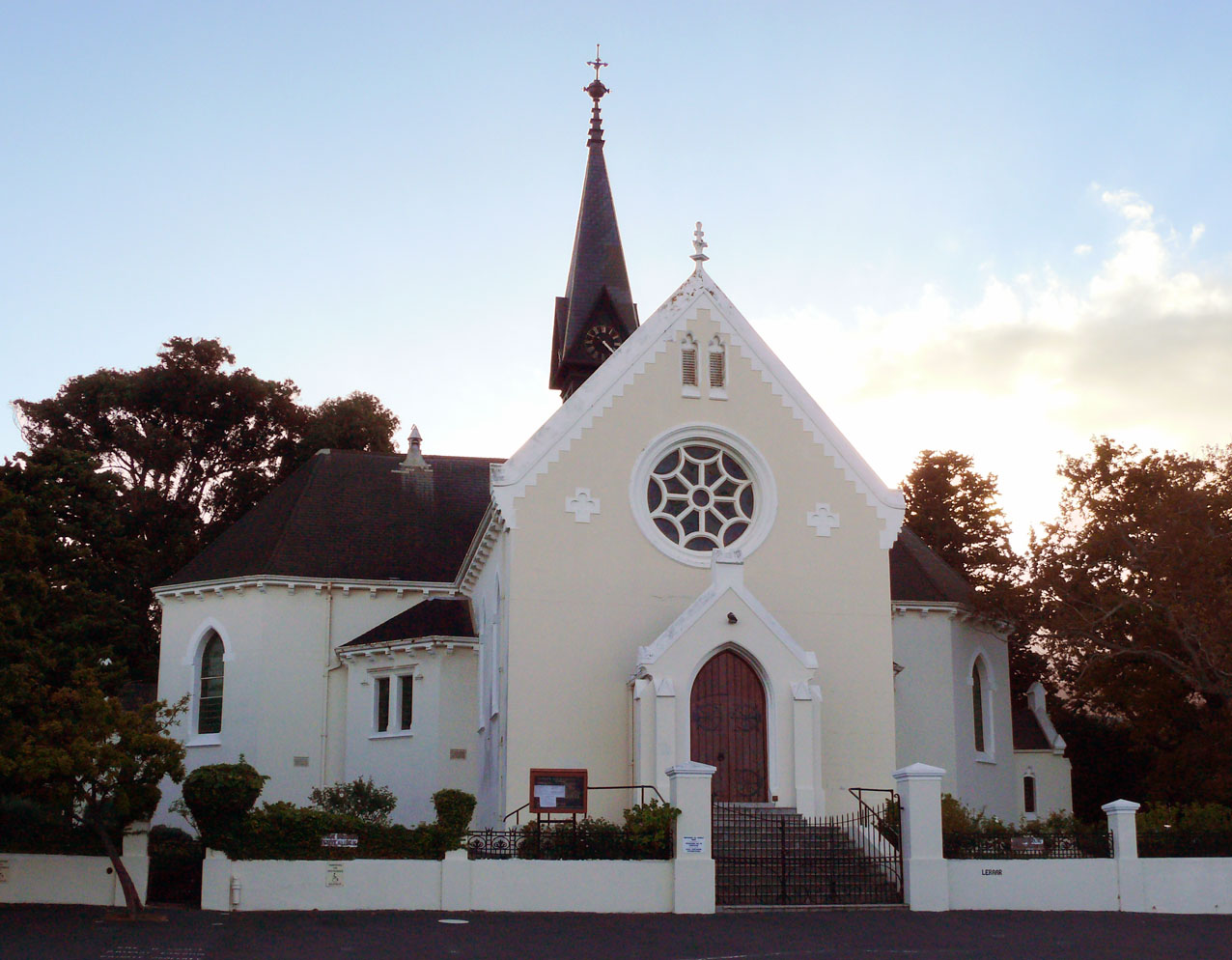
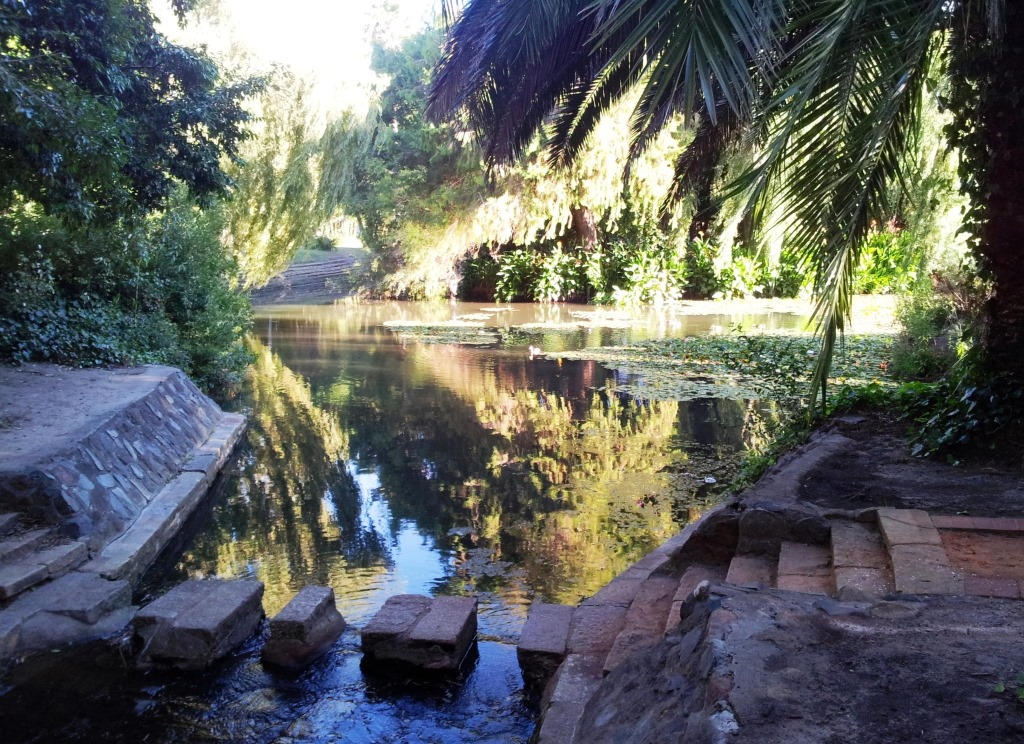
- Wynberg Park Hawthorndon House Wynberg Military Base Wynberg Dutch Reformed Church Maynardville Park
- Interactive map of Wynberg
- Coordinates: 34°00′15″S 18°28′13″E
- Country: South Africa
- Province: Western Cape
- Municipality: City of Cape Town
- Main Place: Cape Town

Government
  - Councillor: Montgomery Oliver (DA)

Area
  - Total: 5.06 km^{2} (1.95 sq mi)

Population (2011)
  - Total: 14,472
  - Density: 2,860/km^{2} (7,410/sq mi)

Racial makeup (2011)
  - Black African: 21.1%
  - Coloured: 46.2%
  - Indian/Asian: 3.6%
  - White: 24.0%
  - Other: 5.4%

First languages (2011)
  - English: 69.6%
  - Afrikaans: 14.9%
  - Xhosa: 5.0%
  - Sotho: 1.1%
  - Other: 9.4%
- Time zone: UTC+2 (SAST)
- Postal code (street): 7800
- PO box: 7824
- Area code: 021

Wynberg (/ˈwaɪnbɜːrɡ/ WYNE-burg) is a suburb in the Southern Suburbs region of the city of Cape Town, South Africa. It is situated between Plumstead and Kenilworth, and is a major transport hub for the Southern Suburbs region of Cape Town.

== History ==
=== Early history ===
In the 1650s, Jan van Riebeeck's farm Boscheuvel, where he planted the Cape's first vineyards and was the first to produce wine in the Cape, was located in the greater Wynberg area close to the slopes of Table Mountain.

In 1683, land along the Liesbeek River was granted to Herman Weeckens by Simon van der Stel. The farm was named De Oude Wijnbergh (Old Wine Mountain). The Cape's rough seas in the winter months led to a formal winter anchorage in 1743 where ships would dock at Simons' Baai (present day Simon's Town). A wagon route linking Cape Town to Simon's Town went over the hill adjacent to De Oude Wjinbergh estate.

When the British took control of the Cape settlement on 16 Sept 1795 the small farming area of Wynberg developed rapidly into a garrison town, as the British settled a large number of troops in the area. A notable settler was Alexander Tennant who built a house still standing, named Sonnebloem. At Wynberg the Dutch had earlier made a show of resistance, but they were soon driven from their post by the British.

Wynberg was a convenient halfway point between Table Bay and False Bay and this led to a hub of commercial activity. The authorities had allotted places where large teams of oxen could be unyoked and graze which made this possible. The village provided farmers with an alternative to the market in Cape Town. As more farms were subdivided commercial and residential properties began to increase.

Diplomat Edmund Roberts passed through Wynberg in 1833. He described it as being "beautiful," and being "adorned with a great number of gentlemen's seats, and neat cottages, the avenues leading to them having well-trimmed hedges of myrtle and oak..."

The famous astronomer John Herschel lived at Wynberg between 1834 and 1838, where he set up a telescope in nearby Claremont to study the southern hemisphere skies, and also did some botanical work on South African flowers together with his wife Margaret. In addition, it was in Wynberg that the young Charles Darwin met Herschel in 1836, a meeting which considerably influenced Darwin's later work.

By the 1850 a significantly large Muslim community had become established in the area with a Muslim graveyard established in 1848, thirty-six years later, in 1886, the Yusafaya mosque was constructed.

In 1861 the Wynberg Railway Company was established and a railway connecting the village to Cape Town was completed in 1865, serviced by a CGR 4-4-0 “Wynberg Tank” locomotive.

In 1876, the company was bought by the Cape government, its railway tracks converted to Cape gauge and the line extended to Muizenberg six years later. The opening of the railway played in important part in transforming the village into a satellite town from which commuters could easily travel to Cape Town.

=== 1891 to 1904 ===
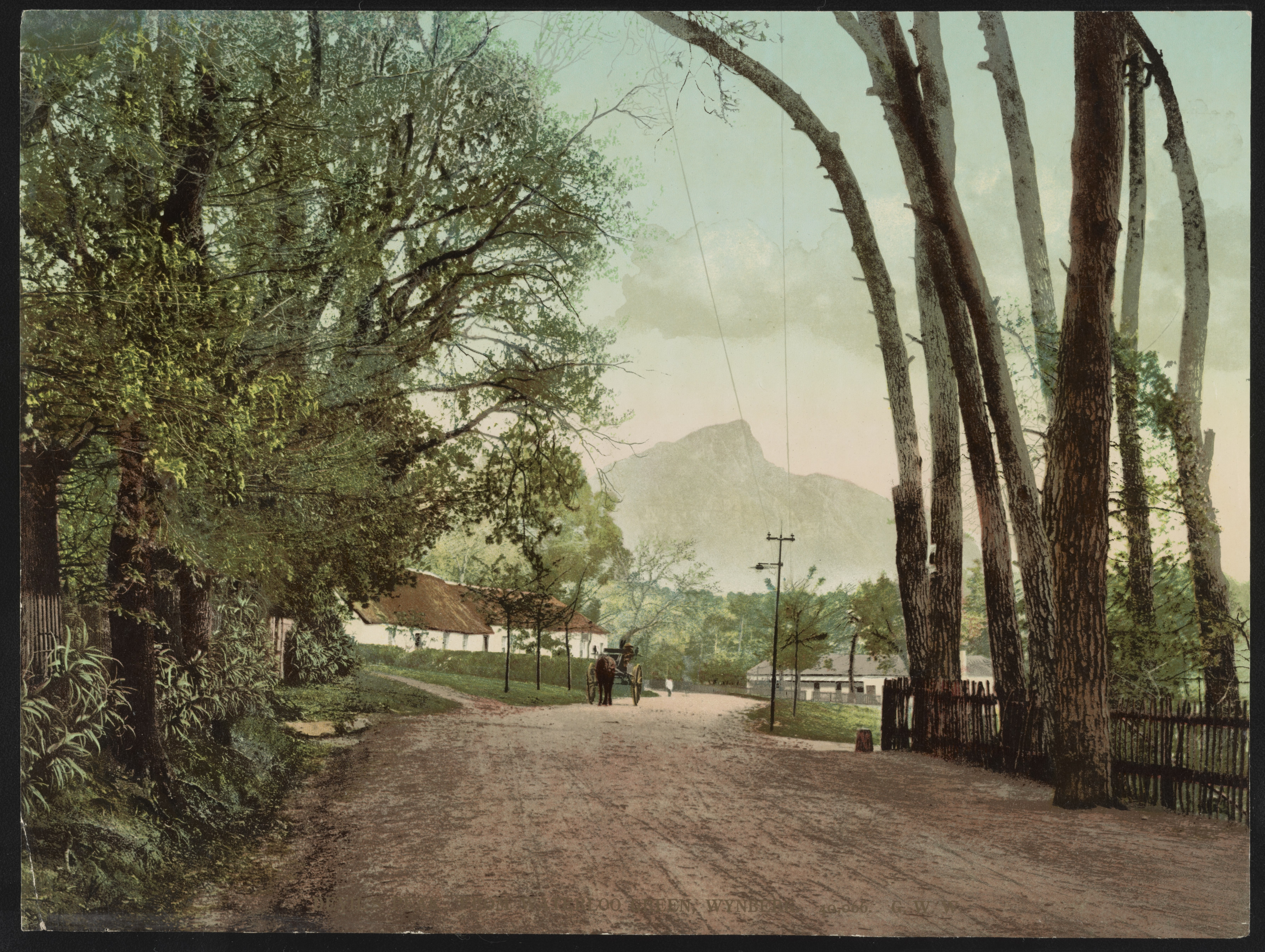
Devil's Peak, from Waterloo Green, Wynberg in 1890.

From 1891 to 1904 the Wynberg experienced a period of rapid growth and expanding infrastructure, many of which were driven by the towns mayor James Bisset. The 1891 census recorded a population of 4,952, and by the time of the 1904 Cape census, Wynberg had a total population of 13,697, with the greater Wynberg municipal area having a population of 20,404 residents. The population boom during this period was likely fueled by the Boer War and the growth of the Wynberg Military Base.

Battswood School was established in Wynberg in 1891 by Martha Grey. One of South Africa's first electric power plants was built in Wynberg on Electric Road in 1893 to provide power to a local tram system and public streetlights.

In 1902, King Edward Park, now known as Wynberg Park, was opened. The 1890s also saw the securing of a municipal water supply from Table Mountain and the municipal wide installation of a waterborne sewage system.

During this period Wynberg hosted one of the largest Jewish communities in the Cape, leading to the construction of the Wynberg synagogue in 1897.

Wynberg in 1900
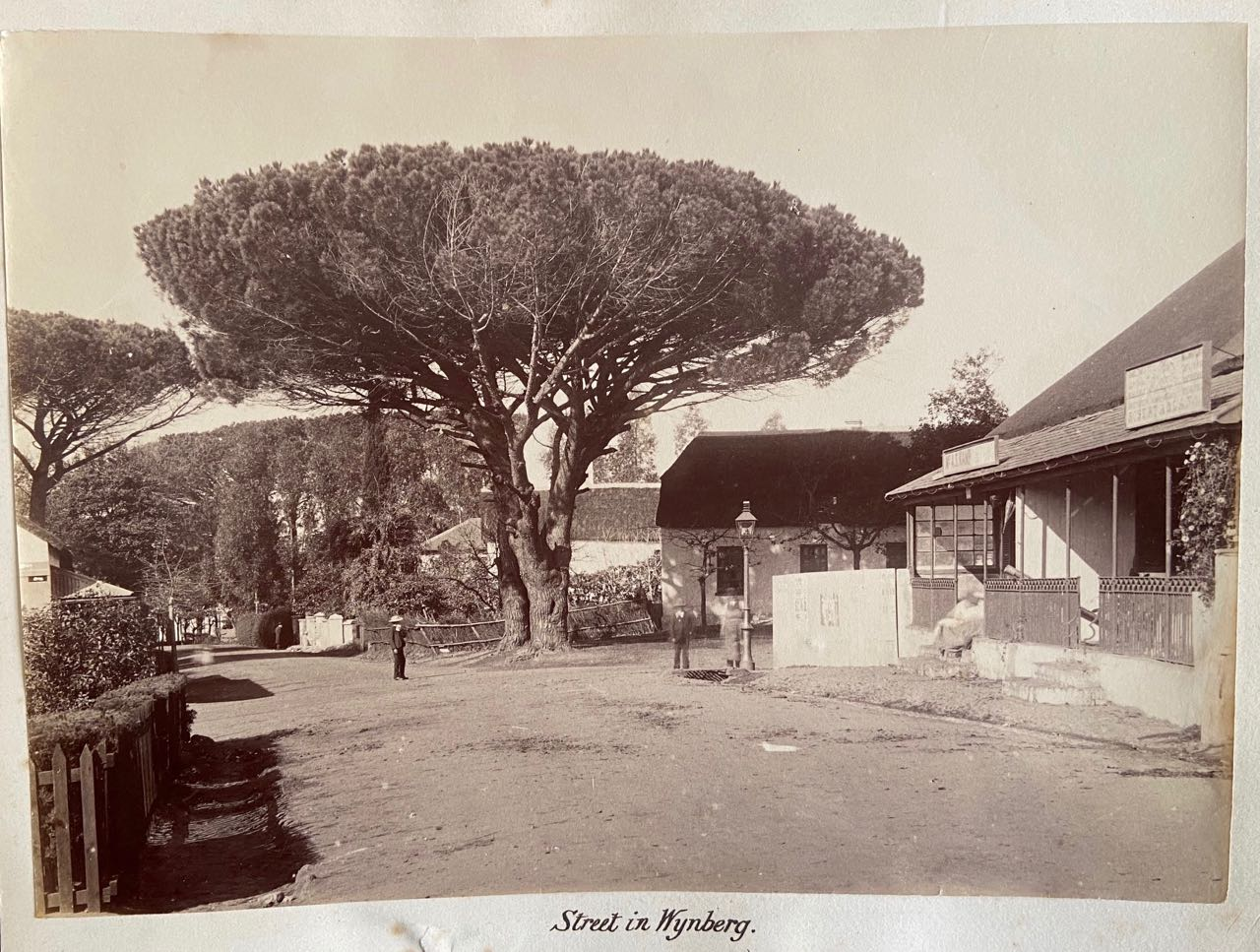
Wynberg as it would have appeared around 1900 looking down Durban Road as it intersects Wolfe Street.

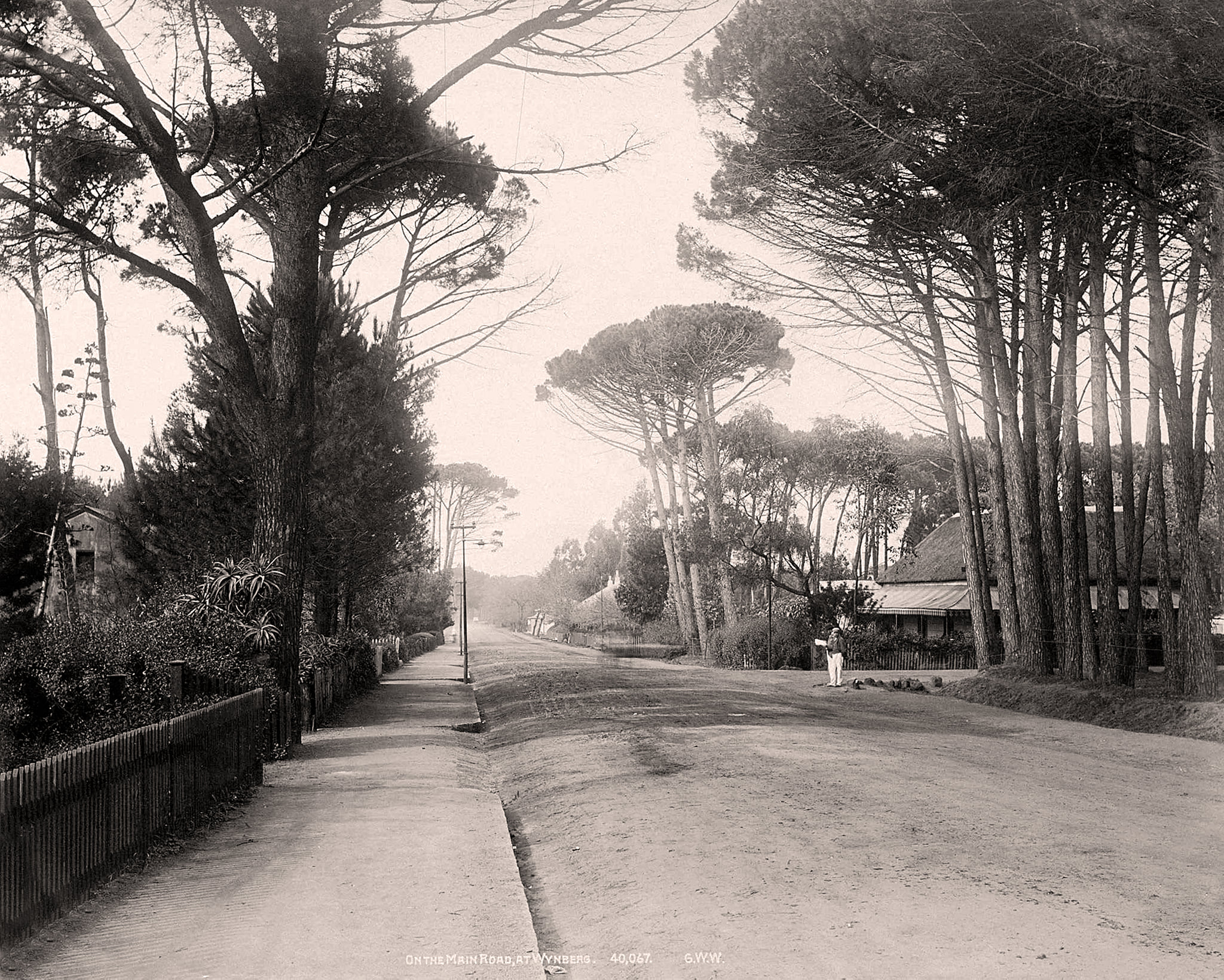
A view down Main Road, Wynberg around the year 1900

=== Merger into Cape Town ===
The municipality of Wynberg was merged into the City of Cape Town following a local referendum on 11 June 1927. The merger was prompted by complaints from community members in outlying areas of the municipality, such as Diep River and Plumstead, that their areas were being neglected and that much needed urban upgrades to roads, sanitation, and the provision of electricity were not being met.

Additionally, the municipality had accrued a large debts amounting to £650,000 (R205,137,000 in 2018). At the time Wynberg was the largest municipality bordering Cape Town in terms of the number of registered voters in the area (4,250) with only Claremont (3,226) and Sea Point (3,601) being comparable; the municipality included the modern day Cape Town neighborhoods of Plumstead, Diep River, Retreat, Heathfield, Tokai, Constantia, Princess Vlei, Grassy Park, Southfield, Wynberg, and parts of Kenilworth.

== Geography ==
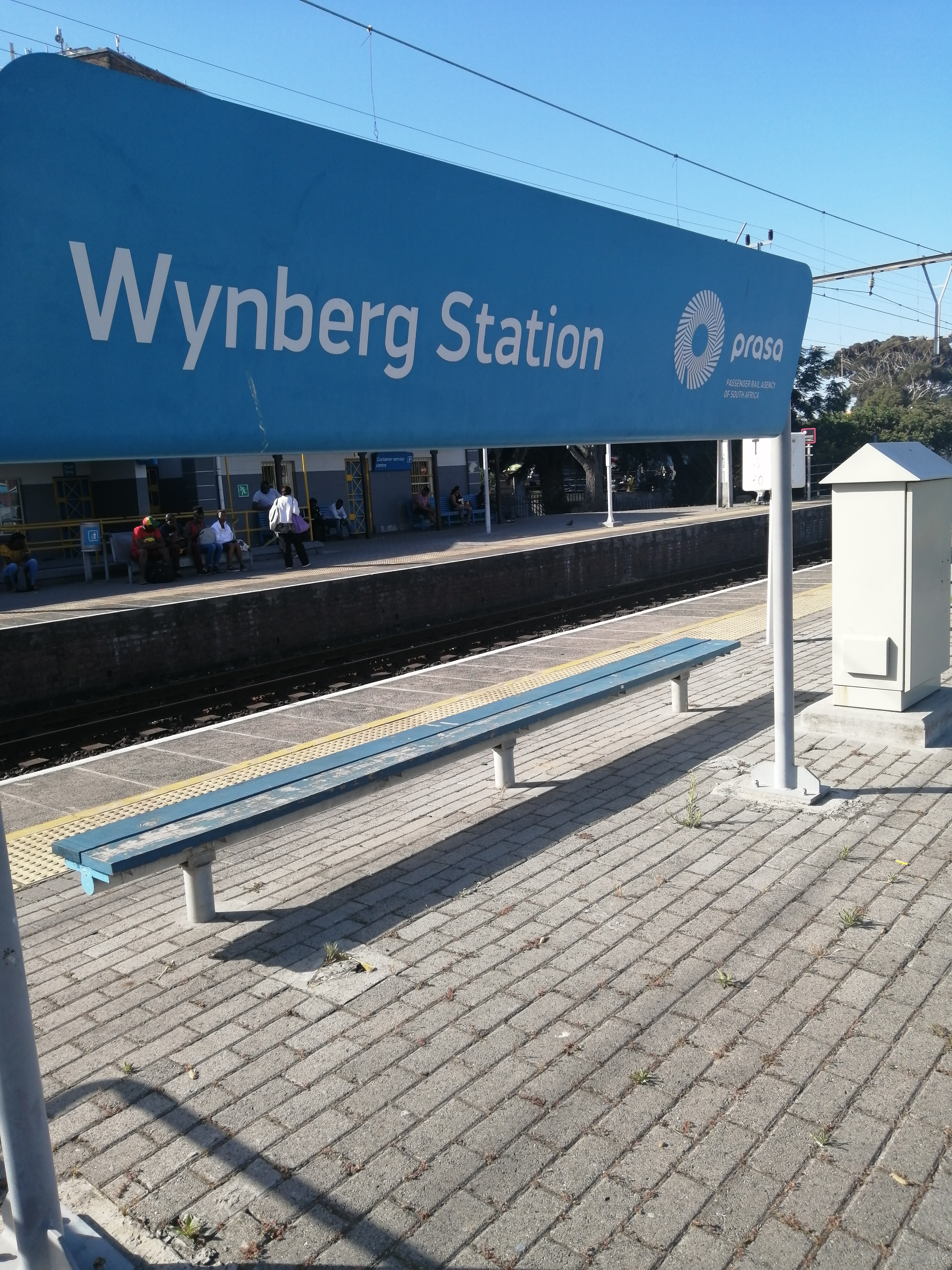
The Wynberg railway station located in Station Road

Wynberg is bordered by Kenilworth to the north and Plumstead to the south east, Constantia is situated to its west. The Wynberg railway station is on the Southern Line from Cape Town to Simon's Town. Main Road (which runs from Central Cape Town through to Simon's Town) runs through Wynberg, and the suburb can also be accessed from the M3 freeway which skirts the west of the Neighborhood close to the Wynberg Military Base.

Within Wynberg itself the area is often divided up into the Wynberg Village area in the west where many historic homes are located, the wealthier area of Upper Wynberg in the north west, the Wynberg commercial centre located along Main Road (M4), and Wynberg East on the eastern side of the railway where many historic landmarks and places of worship are located including the Yusuffia mosque.

== Demographics ==
According to the 2011 census the neighborhood had a total of 14,472 residents with 69.6% speaking English as their first language.

The 2001 the census recorded 4,417 households and 12,821 people residing in the suburb. The racial makeup of the suburb was 8.42% Black African, 49.82% Coloured, 11.93% Indian/Asian, 29.83% White and 0% from other races. In the suburb the population was spread out, with 24.67% under the age of 18, 29.94% from 18 to 34, 25.65% from 35 to 54, 8.74% from 55 to 64, and 11.00% who were 65 years of age or older.

For every 100 females there were 85.44 males. 77.69% of the population spoke English, 15.34% Afrikaans, 4.45% isiXhosa, 1.59% another African language and 0.92% some other language as a first language.

== Arts and culture ==
The Maynardville Community Chest Carnival takes place annually, during the first half of the year.

== Attractions and amenities ==
- Dutch Reformed Church
- Maynardville Open-Air Theatre, annual host venue to Shakespeare in the Park productions.
- Victoria Hospital, a district hospital with over 200 beds, at which a Thuthuzela Care Centre is situated for victims of rape
- Wynberg Park

== Education ==
Wynberg Boys' High School, on the hillside above the main village, is the second oldest school in South Africa, having been established in 1841. It is located on Hawthornden Estate alongside the former stately home of Prince Labia. The Junior School is housed in Victorian buildings in Cape Town designed by acclaimed architect Sir Herbert Baker. There are two prominent all-girls schools in the area: Wynberg Girls' High School is located near the village, whilst Springfield Convent School, founded by Irish Dominican Sisters from Cabra, Dublin in 1871, serves as a Catholic school situated close to Wynberg Park.

== Sports ==
The Royal Cape Golf Club, South Africa's oldest club, had its beginning on 14 November 1885 when Lt Gen Sir Henry Torrens, Governor of the Cape Colony chaired a meeting at the Cape Town Castle "for the purpose of introducing the game of golf and starting a club for the same". It was on Waterloo Green at the Wynberg Military Camp that the club established its first home. The layout of the course is not known and it is certain that playing conditions at their best were rough and ready.

== Military base ==
The military base was established in 1804 following the report of a commission appointed to find a suitable base for the 'Hottentot Corps'. The farm of Alexander Tennant, De Oude Wynberg, was selected. From 1804 the military took increasing interest in this strategic location. Tennant sold 78 morgen to the Cape government in March 1809; while the British Secretary at War acquired a further 54 morgen in June 1886. December 1921 saw the transfer of all the land, property and buildings to the government of the Union of South Africa.

A rock behind 2 Military Hospital bears an inscription recording the dates when the 59th Regiment (2nd East Lancashire) formed part of the Cape garrison: 1806, 1859–61, 1911–14. The Officers' Mess was declared a Provincial Heritage Site.

== Coat of arms ==
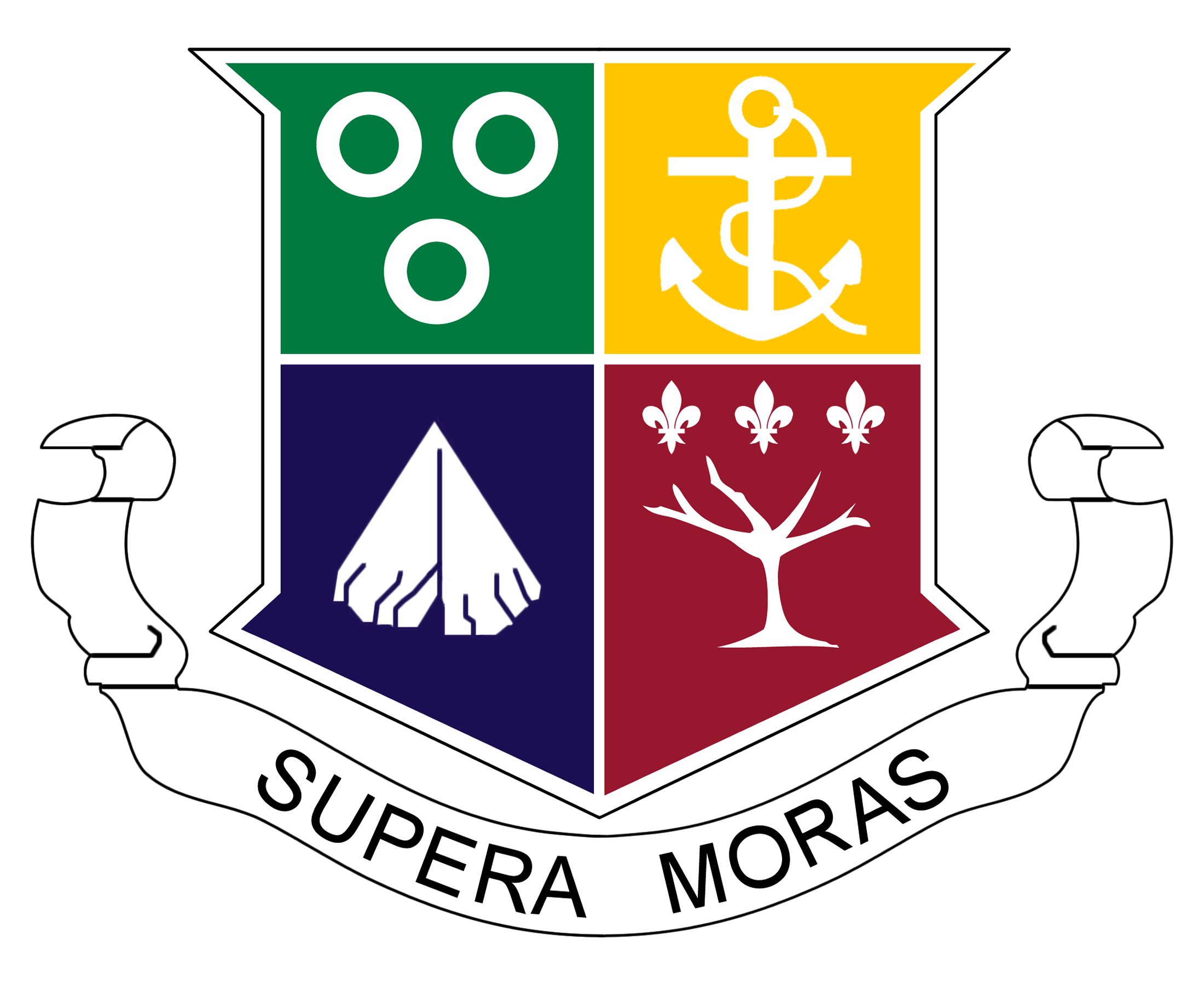
The coat of arms is very similar in appearance to the crest of Wynberg Boys High School.

Wynberg was a municipality in its own right from 1886 to 1927. The town council adopted a coat of arms, designed by councillor Stanley Ponder, on 17 June 1895.

The shield was quartered. In the first quarter were three golden rings on a red background (the arms of Jan van Riebeeck). In the second quarter was a black anchor on a golden background, representing the Cape Colony. The third quarter was black, showing a white tent with a pennant flying (to represent the military garrison). The fourth quarter depicted a golden vine and three fleurs de lis against a green background. The motto was Vivit crescat floreat vitis.

Variants of these arms were later adopted by Wynberg Boys' High School, the Wynberg Bowling Club, Wynberg Sports Club, Wynberg Club and South Peninsula Rugby Football Club.

== See also ==
- List of heritage sites in Wynberg, Cape Town

== Notable residents ==
- Alexander Tennant (born 1772), businessman.
- James Bisset (1836 – 1919), engineer and politician, was the town's mayor.
- Martha Grey (1838 – 1916), educationalist and philanthropist.
- John de Villiers, 1st Baron de Villiers (1842–1914), lawyer and judge, became "Baron de Villiers, of Wynberg."
- Thomas Upington (1844–1898), Administrator and former Prime Minister of the Cape Colony, who lived his final years and died in Wynberg.
- Olive Schreiner (1855–1920), author and activist, died in Wynberg in 1920
- Hasie Versfeld (1866 – 1941), South African international rugby union player. Born in Wynberg.
- Charles Warburton Meredith (1896 – 1977), Royal Air Force and South African Air Force officer. Born in Wynberg.
- Frank Osborne (1896 – 1988), English international footballer who played for Fulham and Tottenham Hotspur. Born in Wynberg.
- Reg Osborne (1898 – 1977), English footballer who played for Leicester City. Born in Wynberg.
- Paul Sauer (1898 - 1976 ), South African politician and cabinet minister. Born in Wynberg.
- Tikvah Alper (1909–1995), radiobiologist, was born in Wynberg.
- Jack Watermeyer (1911 – 2003), Former Chief Justice of South Africa. Born in Wynberg.
- Robin Pare (1919 – 1942), South African World War II flying ace. Born in Wynberg.
- Rob Louw (born 1955), former Springbok rugby union player. Born in Wynberg.
- Gillion Bosman (born 1987/8), politician, currently resides in Wynberg
- Kirsten Pearce (born 1991), New Zealand Olympic field hockey player. Born in Wynberg.
