= 1858–59 Cape Colony parliamentary election =

- 8 September 1858 – 2 March 1859

All 46 seats in the Assembly (lower house) 24 seats are needed for a majority All 15 seats in the Council (upper house) 8 seats are needed for a majority
	Majority party	Minority party	Third party
Leader	Rawson W. Rawson		John Paterson
Party	Administration	Western Liberal group	Eastern separatist group
Seats won	Appointed (Colonial Secretary)		Eastern Province (council)
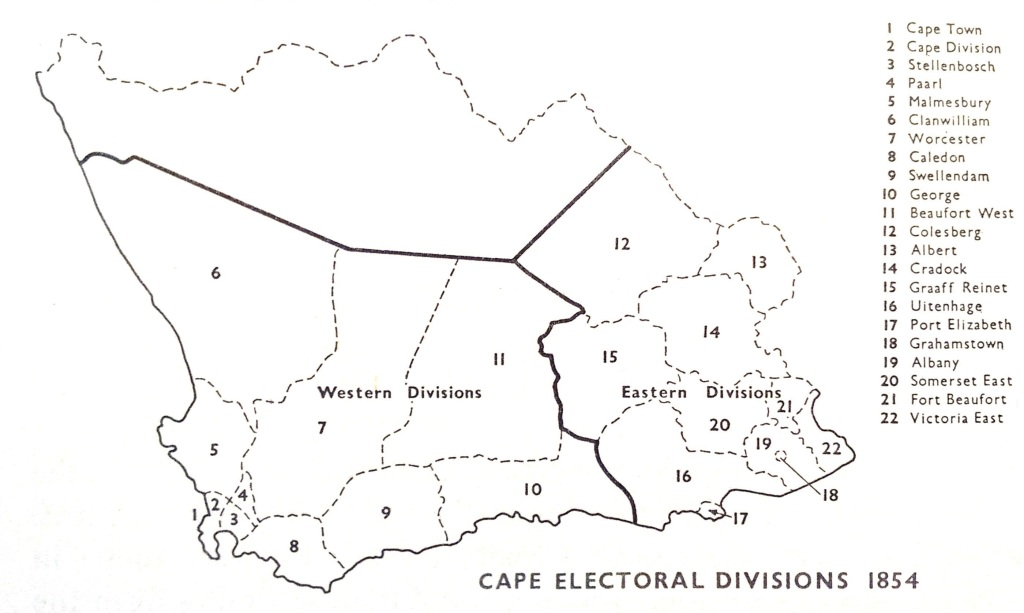
- Provinces and electoral districts.

The 1858–59 Cape Colony parliamentary election was conducted between September 1858 and early March 1859. This was the second election for the Cape parliament, which had been established in 1854.

Despite the election, the parliament was weak and executive power remained firmly in the hands of the Governor, Sir George Grey, who was appointed from London. Rawson W. Rawson continued as the colony's Colonial Secretary. As Colonial Secretary, Rawson could speak in both the Assembly and Council, but held no voting rights.

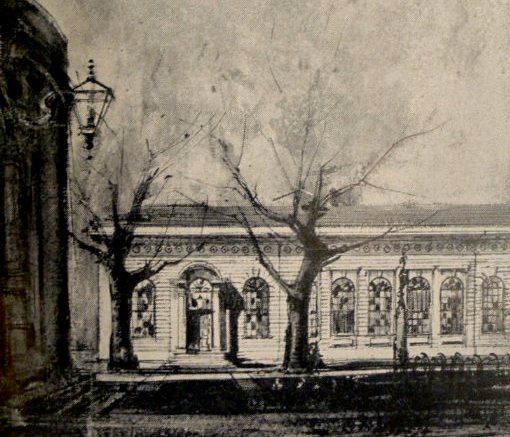
Since the previous election, the parliament had moved to a new building: the Goede Hoop Masonic Lodge buildings.

In the Eastern Province, the assembly elections saw little excitement, with some constituencies had difficulty even finding willing candidates. In the Assembly constituency of Albany, which returned 2 members of the Assembly, only 4 people voted. Andries Stockenström and Robert Godlonton, both representatives for the Eastern Division in the council, chose not to seek re-election.

== Constituencies ==
For elections to the House of Assembly, the Cape was divided into 22 electoral divisions, returning a total of 46 members. The electoral division boundaries corresponded with the existing Cape Colony fiscal divisions. The only exceptions to this were for Albany, and the urban areas of Cape Town-Green Point and Grahamstown, (which were not included in the Cape electoral division), which had their own electoral divisions.

== Members elected ==
=== Assembly ===
Constituency	Member	Party
Albany	Henry Calderwood	
Albany	SLATER	
Albert	KRUGER	
Albert	HOPLEY	
Beaufort West	John Charles Molteno	
Beaufort West	Dr James Christie	
Caledon		
Caledon		
Cape Town	J. D. Thompson	
Cape Town	M. J. Louw	
Cape Town	Saul Solomon	
Cape Town	Petrus Kotzé	
Cape Division	BLAKE	
Cape Division	Johan Conrad Silberbauer	
Clanwilliam		
Clanwilliam		
Colesburg		
Colesburg		
Cradock	Charles Scanlen	
Cradock	CALDECOTT	
Fort Beaufort		
Fort Beaufort		
George	PRINCE	
George	WALTERS	
Graaff-Reinet	MEINTJES	
Graaff-Reinet	Jeremias Ziervogel	
Grahams Town		
Grahams Town		
Malmesbury	LEEDOLFF	
Malmesbury	DUCKITT	
Paarl	J. J. Proctor	
Paarl	HAUPT	
Port Elizabeth	John Ross Philip	
Port Elizabeth		
Somerset	BOWKER	
Somerset	KRUGER	
Stellenbosch	Christoffel Brand	
Stellenbosch	BOSMAN	
Swellendam	John Fairbairn	
Swellendam	WHITE	
Worcester	MINNIK	
Worcester	LE SUEUR	
Uitenhage	BILLINGHAM	
Uitenhage	KROG	
Victoria East		
Victoria East		

=== Council ===
Constituency	Member	Party
Eastern Province	Joseph Cawood	
Eastern Province	Charles Pote	
Eastern Province	John Paterson	
Eastern Province	William Southey	
Eastern Province	Julius Mosenthal	
Eastern Province	Ludwig Johan Frederick von Maltitz	
Eastern Province	James Henry Greathead	
Western Province	Joseph Barry	
Western Province	John Stein	
Western Province	Petrus Emanuel Roubaix	
Western Province	Jan de Wet, LLD	
Western Province	Hercules Crosse Jarvis	
Western Province	Johan Hendrik Wicht	
Western Province	Dirk Gysbert van Breda	
Western Province	Francis William Reitz	
