= Charles Hutton (disambiguation) =

Charles Hutton (1737–1823) was an English mathematician.

Charles Hutton may also refer to:

- Charles Hutton Gregory (1817–1898), English civil engineer
- Charles William Hutton (1826–1905), South African politician
- Charles Hutton (politician) (1861–1949), Canadian politician
- Charles Hutton (architect) (1905–1995), English architect
