= William Hume (Cape politician) =

South African politician (1837–1916)

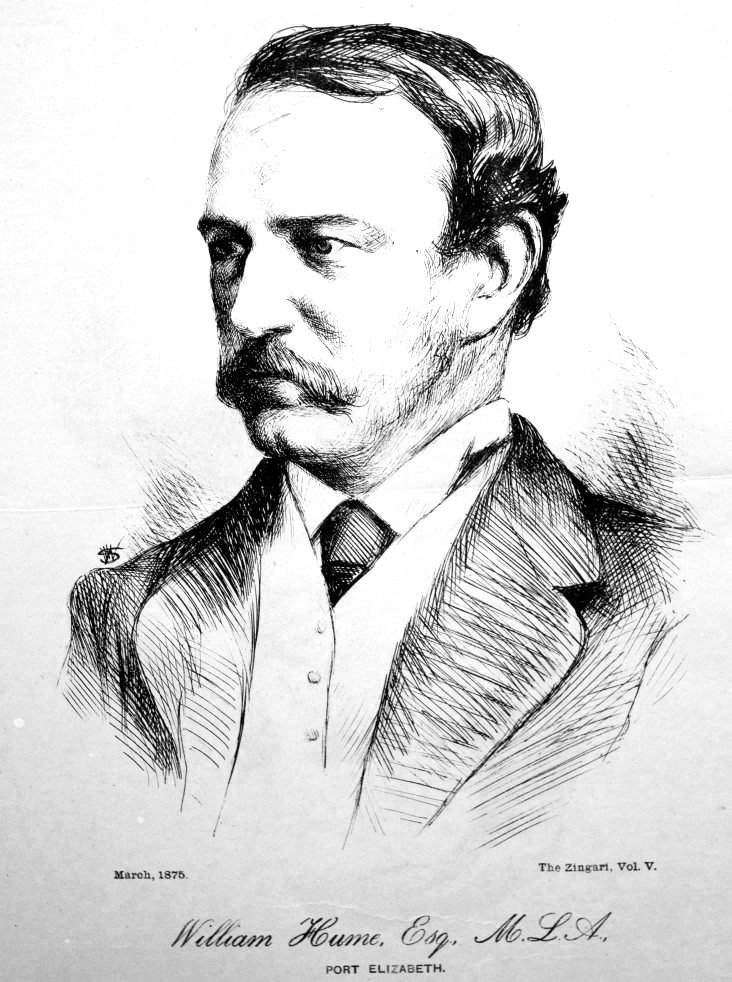
William Hume. A sketched portrait from the Zingari newspaper

William Arthur Hume (June 1837 – 2 Mar 1916) was a prominent politician of the Cape Colony and the Member for Port Elizabeth in the Cape Parliament.

== Early life ==
Born in Grahamstown in 1837, Hume became a citrus farmer in the Sundays river valley and moved to Port Elizabeth, where he settled.

He married Louisa Mary Carlisle in 1871.

== Politics (1874-75) ==
A merchant who was successful in business, he entered politics and was elected as the MLA for Port Elizabeth from 1874 until only the next year.

=== Separatism ===
Hume was a member of the "Eastern Cape Separatist League", that strove for a separate Colony for the white settlers of the Eastern Cape. This movement later split between those who supported Grahamstown as a future political centre, and those who supported Port Elizabeth. Both factions were defeated by a strong liberal coalition based in Cape Town in the western half of the Cape Colony, which strongly opposed any racial or regional divisions.

=== Confederation ===
When Lord Carnarvon of the London Colonial Office attempted to strengthen imperial control over southern Africa, by drawing all of the region's states into a British "Confederation", the remnants of the separatist league saw in this policy a means of reviving the movement for a separate British Eastern Colony.

Hume was unique, among these leaders, in that he rejected the Confederation plan, foreseeing that it would lead to war and instability. He was also notable for remaining unmoved by the speeches and arguments of the imperial agent James Anthony Froude, unlike the majority of his colleagues. In addition, he joined the majority of the Cape's elected representatives in defending the Cape's democratic independence, under the current system of "responsible government", and rejecting outside interference from London.

The end result was that he sided with the locally elected Cape government, in opposing the imperial moves to enforce confederation, and was widely reviled by separatist leaders like Jock Paterson as having betrayed his political allies.

== Later life and family ==
He was the first president of the Port Elizabeth Club, Chair of the city's Chamber of Commerce, and Chair of the Harbour Board. The Port Elizabeth suburb of Humewood (founded on Harbour Board land in the 1890s) was named after him.
