= Silberbauer =

Silberbauer is a surname. Notable people with the surname include:

- Johan Conrad Silberbauer (1826–1897), South African politician
- Karl Silberbauer (1911–1972), Austrian SS Sergeant who arrested Anne Frank
- Michael Silberbauer (born 1981), Danish footballer and manager
