= Eastern Province Herald =

The Eastern Province Herald is a newspaper, founded in 1845 and based in Port Elizabeth, South Africa.

== John Paterson, founder of the Eastern Province Herald (1822-1880) ==
John Paterson was born in March 1822 in Aberdeen, Scotland, the son of a vintner/farmer/stone-mason, John Paterson Snr. and his wife Barbara. When John was six years old his father died as a result of an accident in a stone quarry. After John Snr's death, Barbara undertook to educate the boy but in 1832 she was persuaded to send him to Aberdeen Grammar School which he attended until 1836. While there he studied mathematics under Dr James Gordon of the Mathematical Public School of Aberdeen. In November 1836, he went to Marischal College, applied for a bursary and won one which saw him through the next four years of his University training. In his first year there he came third in Greek. The following year he studied Natural Philosophy, Higher Greek and Latin. During his third year he came second in Mathematics. On October 6, 1840, he was awarded his M.A. When Professor James Rose-Innes returned home to Aberdeen from the Cape Colony to recruit teachers for the senior government schools planned by Sir George Napier and Sir John Herschel.

== The founding of the Eastern Province Herald ==
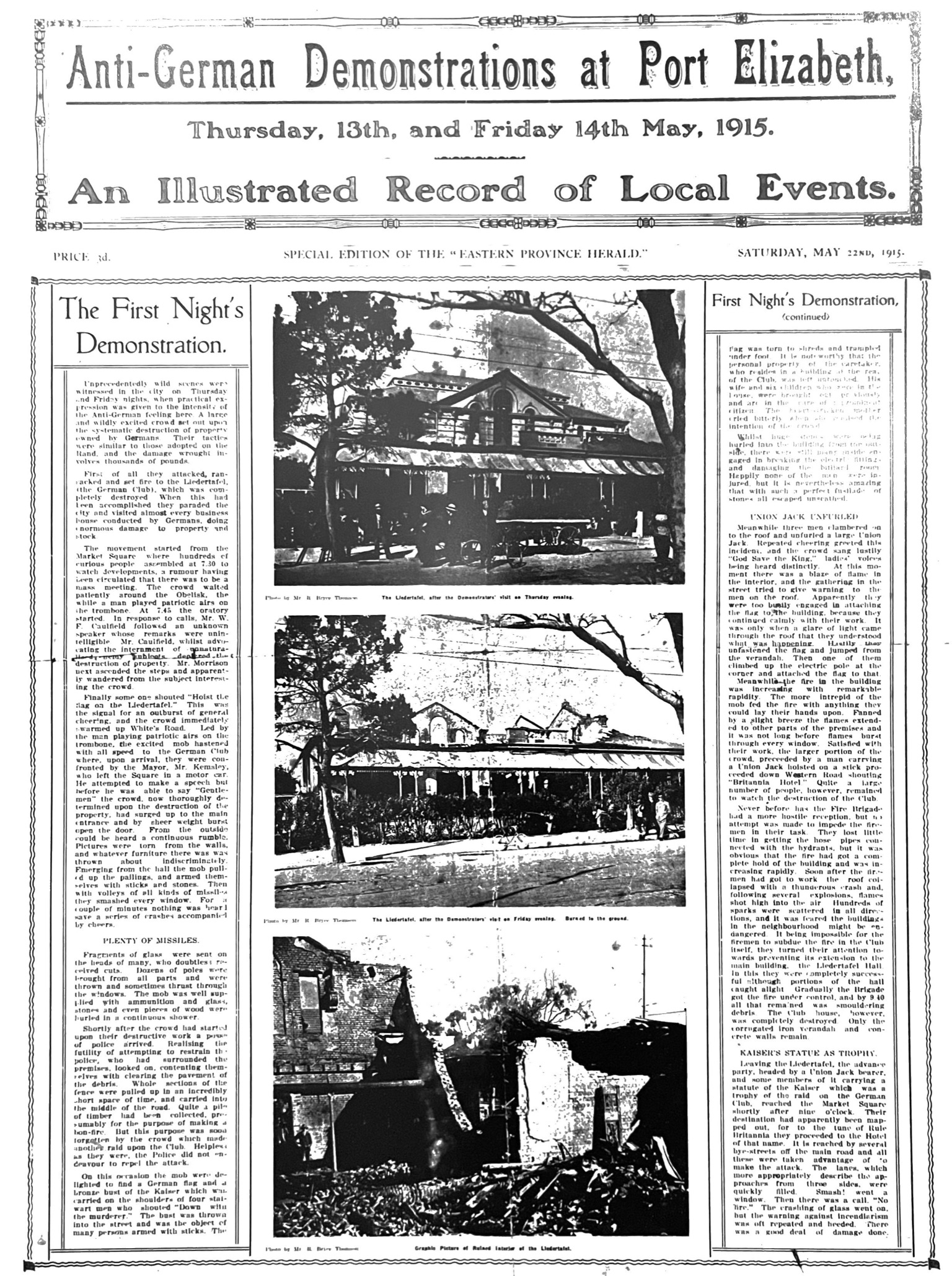
Special edition 1915.

The paper was founded by Scottish immigrant John Paterson (Cape politician - Jock Paterson) on May 7, 1845. In 1841 Paterson was contracted by the Cape Government to become a teacher at the free school in Port Elizabeth. His contract forbade him to hold two jobs so he registered the newspaper in the name of his business partner, John Ross Phillip, son of missionary John Philip. After an argument with his business partner regarding the printing of the newspaper, Paterson temporarily ceased publication of the Eastern Province Herald but after a few months, he resumed publication. In 1857 he sold the Eastern Province Herald to his friend Robert Godlonton, owner of the Grahamstown Journal. Philip opened the competing Port Elizabeth Mercury newspaper shortly after the split with Paterson.

In the mid-1870s the Cape Colony underwent a massive economic and social growth, and the paper finally became a daily paper in 1878, as well as a full printing company.
