= Stockenström baronets =

Extinct baronetcy in the Baronetage of the United Kingdom

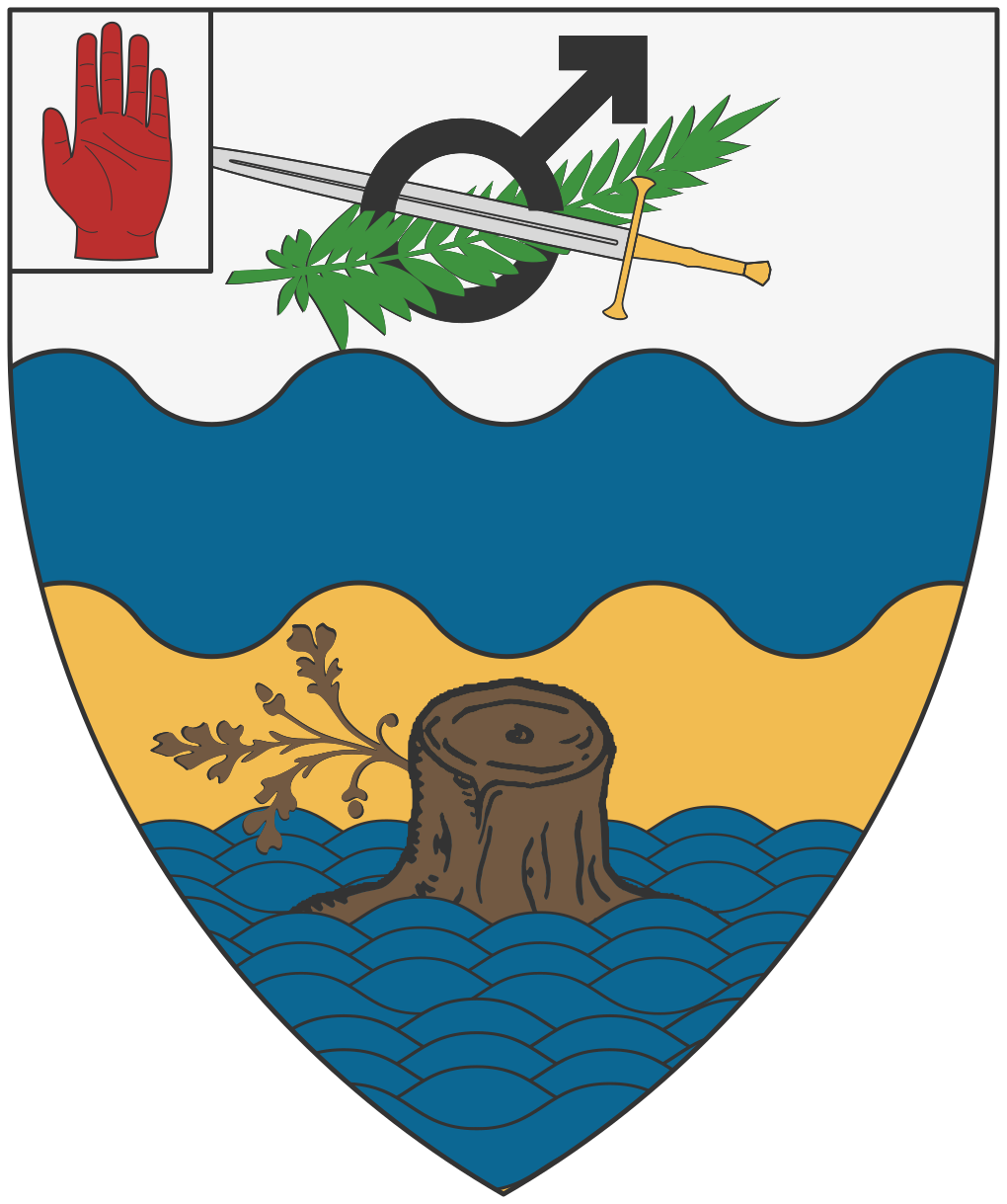
The coat of arms of the Stockenström baronets.

The Stockenström Baronetcy, of Maas Ström in the Cape of Good Hope, was a title in the Baronetage of the United Kingdom. It was created on 29 April 1840 for Andries Stockenström, Lieutenant-Governor of British Kaffraria between 1836 and 1838. The title became extinct on the death of the fourth Baronet in 1957.

== Stockenström baronets, of Maas Ström (1840) ==
- Sir Andries Stockenstrom, 1st Baronet (1792–1864)
- Sir Gysbert Henry Stockenstrom, 2nd Baronet (1841–1912)
- Sir Andries Stockenstrom, 3rd Baronet (1868–1922)
- Sir Anders Johan Booysen Stockenstrom, 4th Baronet (1908–1957)
