= William Matthew Harries =

Member of legislature in Cape Colony (1797–1865)

William Matthew Harries MLC MLA (17 July 1797 – 10 April 1865) was an influential member of both houses of the Parliament of the Cape of Good Hope.

A British settler, Harries was early on involved in politics in the Cape, and he was appointed an unofficial Member of the Legislative Council (at the time a relatively powerless institution) from 1848 until 1849.

He was elected to the Cape Parliament in 1858, to represent Port Elizabeth. In the 1860s, he led the "Eastern Cape Separatist League" in parliament, which fought for a separate settler colony in the Eastern Cape.

In 1863, he successfully fought one of the early moves by parliamentary leader John Molteno and his allies Saul Solomon and Frank Watermeyer, to institute "responsible government" (i.e. locally elected democratic government). In the same year, Harries fought to have the country's capital and seat of government moved away from Cape Town, to a new location in the centre of the country.
