= Cape Qualified Franchise =

Southern Africa voting system, 1853–1968

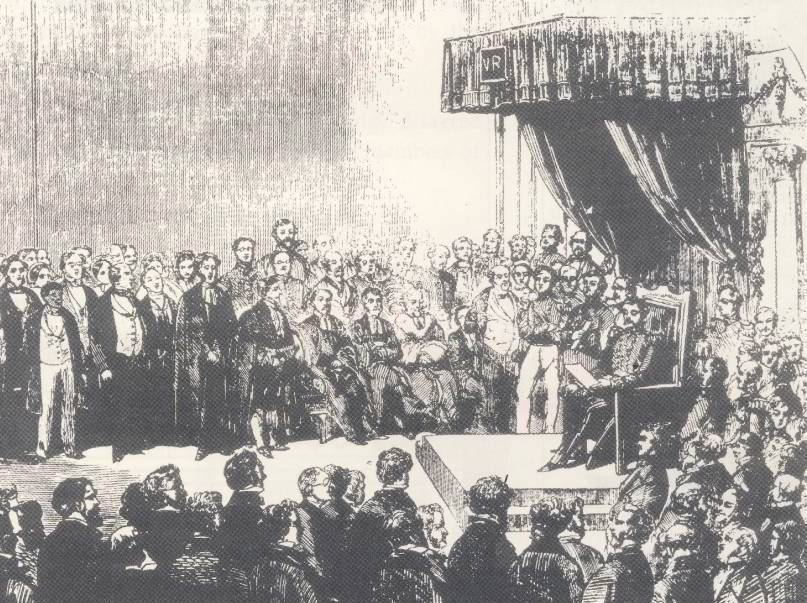
Engraving of the first opening of the Cape Parliament in 1854. The new constitution barred discrimination on the basis of race or colour and, in principle at least, the Parliament and other government institutions at the time were explicitly colour-blind.

The Cape Qualified Franchise was the system of multi-racial franchise that was adhered to in the Cape Colony, and in the Cape Province in the early years of the Union of South Africa. Qualifications for the right to vote at parliamentary elections were applied equally to all men, regardless of race.

This local system of multi-racial suffrage was later gradually restricted, and eventually abolished, under various National Party and United Party governments. In 1930 white women were enfranchised, and in 1931 property qualifications for white voters were removed. In 1936 black voters were then removed from the common voters' rolls and allowed only to elect separate members in 1936, and subsequently denied all representation in the House of Assembly in 1960. Coloured voters similarly followed in 1958 and 1970, respectively.

== Provisions and early history ==
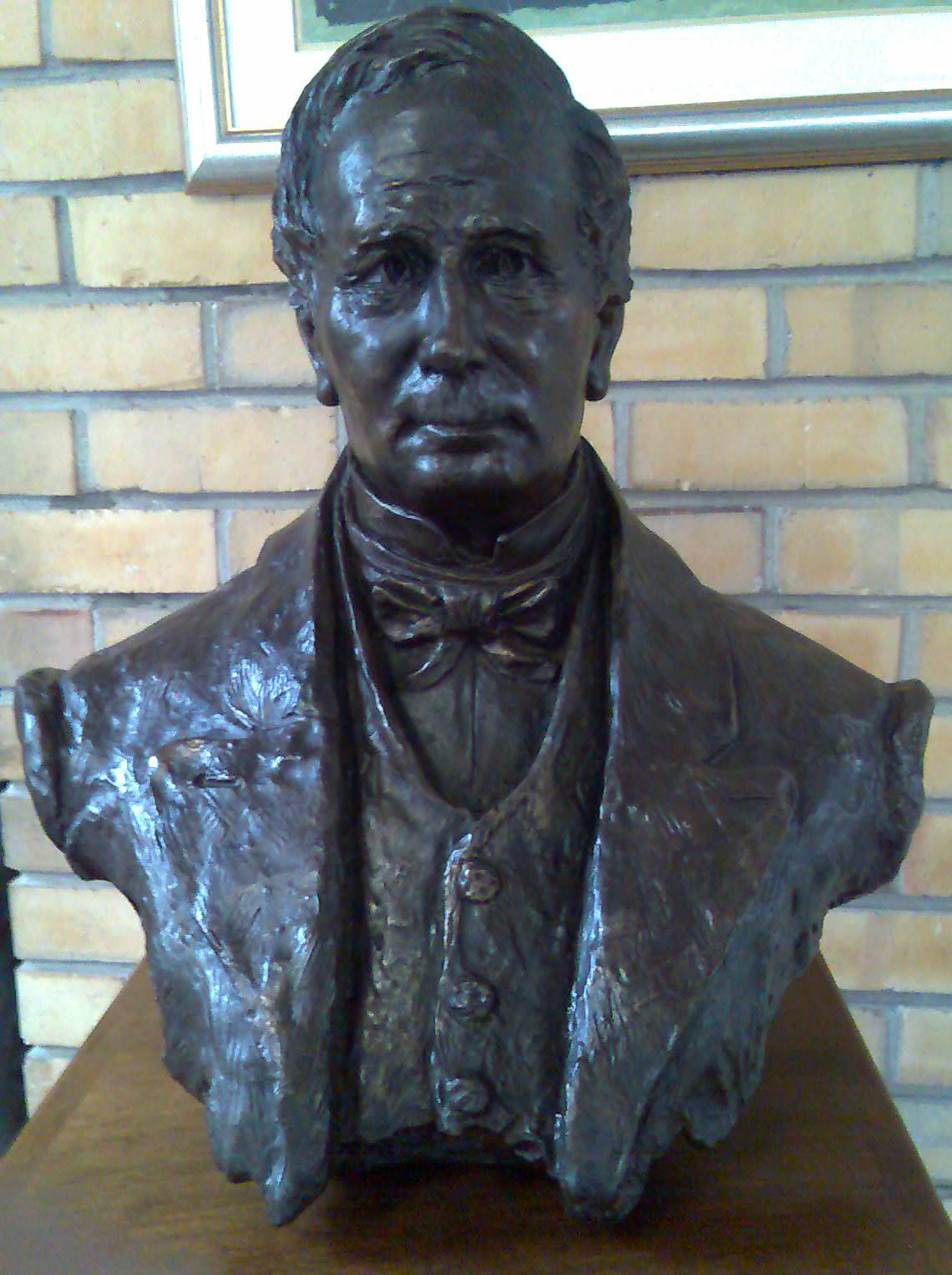
Bust of John Fairbairn, politician, educator and one of the principal architects of the Cape's first, non-racial constitution

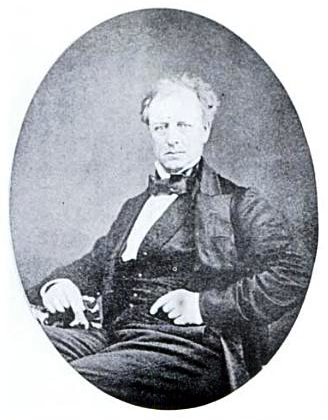
William Porter, Attorney-General, liberal statesman, writer of the Cape Constitution and a proponent of the Qualified Franchise

=== Representative government (1853) ===
The Cape Qualified Franchise first appeared in 1853, when the Cape Colony received representative government and elected its first parliament. This was done without regard to race, and a non-racial voters roll became part of the Cape's 1853 Constitution.

There was a range of motivations for the creation of this early non-racial political system. Many powerful members of the Cape's political elite in the 1850s, leaders such as John Fairbairn, Saul Solomon, John Molteno and William Porter, genuinely seemed to believe that it was the only fair way to run a society, and that racial distinctions counted as unjust discrimination. In 1838, it had already been ruled in the Cape Colony that the law was not to discriminate on the basis of race or colour. On the other hand, there was an additional pragmatic motivation, in that enfranchising the non-white population was seen as a way to bring peace to the Cape's frontier and social harmony to its cities. As such, political inclusiveness was also seen as a way of pre-empting and forestalling black resistance in the future.

When queried by worried white voters on the issue of black citizens voting, William Porter, the Cape attorney-general famously responded:

Why should you fear the exercise of franchise? This is a delicate question but it must be touched upon. I do not hesitate to say that I would rather meet the Hottentot at the hustings, voting for his representative, than in the wilds with his gun upon his shoulder. Is it not better to disarm them by granting them the privileges of the constitution? If you now blast all their hopes and tell them they shall not fight their battles constitutionally, do not you yourselves apply to them the stimulus to fight their battles unconstitutionally? (quoted in Simons and Simons, 1983: 23)

A minimum property ownership of £25 qualified the male Cape citizen to vote or to stand in parliament. As this included all forms of property ownership, including traditional African communal land tenure, it was very low, relative to the suffrage qualifications that applied elsewhere in the world at the time. In fact, it was widely considered to be excessively low, and there were several political movements that tried to have it raised. The system was known as the "£25 vote". Decades later, literacy was added as an additional criterion to qualify for suffrage. The existence of voter qualifications was a standard feature of early democracies, and women's suffrage was virtually unknown in the world at the time. However while the Cape shared these restrictive features, its explicitly colour-blind political system was unusually inclusive.

=== Responsible government (1872) ===
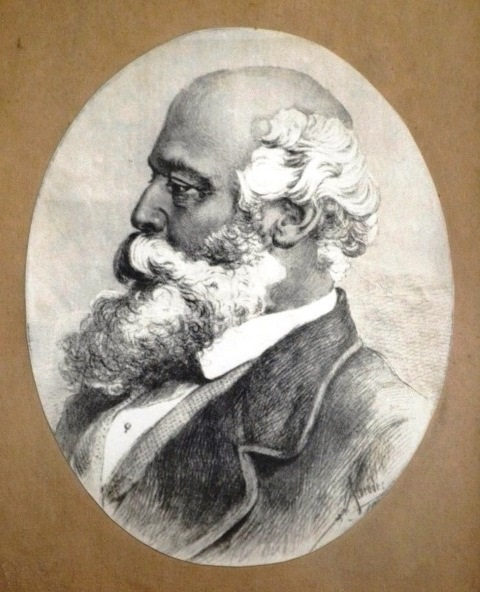
John Molteno, first Prime Minister and a fierce proponent of non-racialism.

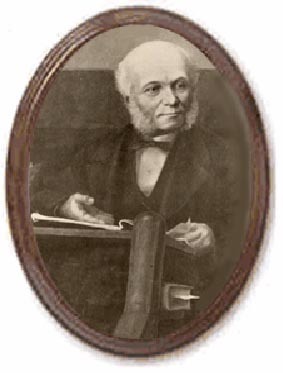
Saul Solomon, strongest proponent of the franchise through the 1860s and 70s.

In spite of its elected legislature, the Cape was still under the direct control of the colonial governor, until 1872, when the colony attained "responsible government" under the leadership of its first Prime Minister, John Molteno. This act brought all three branches of the state's government under local control, made the Executive democratically accountable (or "responsible" as it was known), and thus gave the Cape Colony a degree of legislative independence from the British government. It also stimulated a new political awareness among Cape residents of all backgrounds, with the most notable immediate growth being in Black political consciousness.

The new ministry held the non-racial nature of its institutions to be one of its core ideals, and enshrined it into its new constitution. The commitment to treat Black African and Coloured people as "fellow subjects with white men" was explicitly reaffirmed by the new government, which struck down opposition motions to restrict voting qualifications in 1874, and again in 1878. Campaigns also began in the Eastern Cape frontier region, to register the rural Xhosa peasant farmers as voters, with early, mission-educated Xhosa activists at the forefront. Educational associations and Xhosa language political newspapers such as Isigidimi samaXhosa were founded, which assisted with political mobilisation. Overall the Cape's Black electorate grew rapidly during the 1870s, especially in urban areas. In addition, traditional Xhosa forms of communal land tenure were fully recognised by the Cape government. This made the parties in such traditional property arrangements fully eligible as voters. Consequently, the first Black African political groupings such as Imbumba yama Nyama ("Unity is Strength") also had their origins in this era.

This renewed commitment to non-racial government was not unopposed. Some English settlers in the Eastern Cape felt threatened by it, and their parliamentary representatives, such as John Paterson and Gordon Sprigg, consequently pushed for the disenfranchising of their Xhosa neighbours. The Eastern Cape Separatist League gradually became the pro-imperialist Progressive Party, which later came to power under Cecil Rhodes and Leander Jameson. In addition, the predominantly Afrikaans-speaking Western Cape began to see the birth of rural Cape Dutch groups such as "Onze Jan" Hofmeyr's Afrikaner Bond which also had mixed opinions about African franchise. Right wing media outlets such as the Zingari and the Lantern began the habit of disparagingly labelling MLAs who were elected by the Cape Coloured electorate as "Malays", regardless of their own ethnicity.

However the Western Cape's predominantly English-speaking political elite was still strongly in favour of the "£25 vote", with many liberals such as Saul Solomon even supporting its expansion into total universal franchise. This liberal Cape Town elite was the origin of what became known as the "Cape Liberal Tradition" and also formed the core of the later South African Party.

== Erosion and abolition ==
=== Early restrictions ===
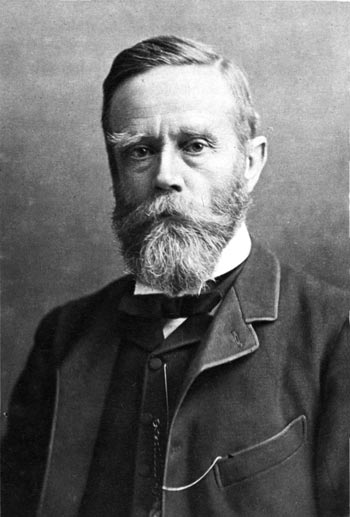
Prime Minister Gordon Sprigg, whose government imposed the first serious legal restrictions on the multi-racial franchise in 1887

The low wealth qualification of the "£25 vote" meant that nearly all owners of any form of property could vote. In addition, the Cape's liberal laws recognised traditional Black land tenure and communal property rights, making such forms of ownership equally valid as voter qualifications. However originally the bulk of the Black population did not exercise their suffrage, partially because most lived in the rural frontier mountains where lack of infrastructure and information made it rare for Blacks to register or to travel to the widely dispersed voting stations.

During the late 19th century, as an increasing number of Black South Africans living in the Cape exercised their voting rights, the pro-imperialist white political bloc in the Eastern Cape led by Rhodes and Jameson moved to roll back the political rights granted to the Black inhabitants in the colony. After coming to power, the nascent Progressive Party, led by Rhodes and fellow politician Sprigg, began enacting legislation to curb Black voting rights.

==== Cape Parliamentary Registration Act (1887) ====
This bill excluded "tribal forms of tenure from the property qualifications for the vote" (Davenport 1987: 108). Prime Minister Gordon Sprigg passed it to prevent communal/tribal land-owners from voting and thus to disenfranchise a large proportion of the Cape's Black citizens who implemented traditional forms of land ownership. This was intended to counter the growing number and influence of Black voters, especially in the Eastern Cape where Sprigg's home constituency was. The act was justifiably controversial and faced fierce opposition in parliament. The Cape's constitution forbade discrimination on the basis of race, and many liberal MPs argued that this act was simply disguised discrimination.

The Cape's Xhosa politicians labelled the act "Tung' umlomo" ("Sew up the mouth"), and responded by greatly intensifying their efforts to register the many thousands of rural Blacks who nonetheless still qualified as potential voters, but who had yet to register. Through their efforts, the number of active Black voters reached its former level again by 1891, and continued to climb.

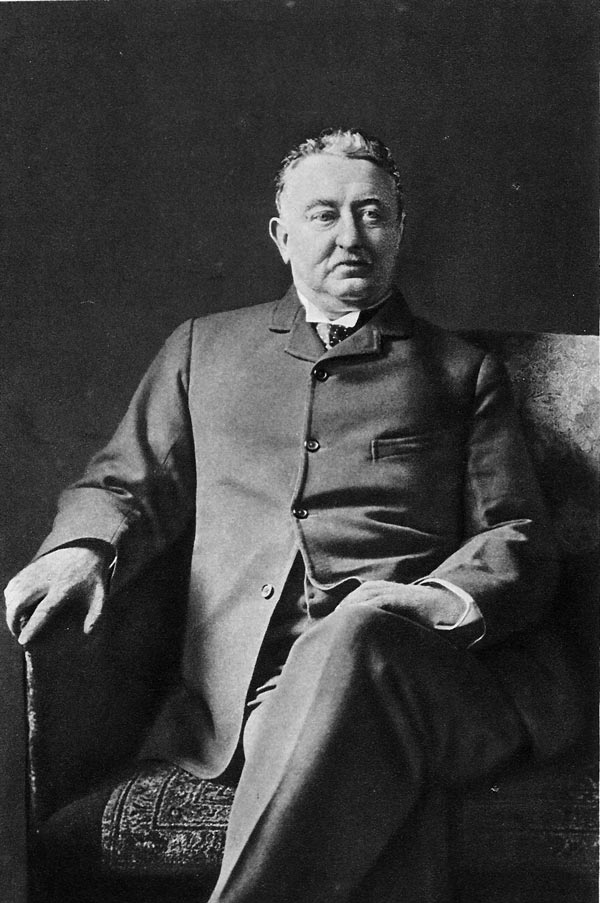
Cecil John Rhodes, as Prime Minister, did much to roll back the effects of the Cape Qualified Franchise and disenfranchise the Cape's Black African citizens.

==== Cape Franchise and Ballot Act (1892) ====
Cape Prime Minister Cecil Rhodes was concerned that, as more and more Black men exercised their constitutional right to vote, many Cape constituencies were becoming controlled by the Black vote. He had earlier voiced his views on Black political empowerment in a speech in the Cape Parliament in June 1887 in which he stated:

"My motto is equal rights for every civilized man south of the Zambezi. What is a civilized man? It is a man who has sufficient education to write his name, and has some property or works, not a loafer. We will treat the Natives as long as they remain in a state of barbarism".

"The native is to be treated as a child and denied the franchise. We must adopt a system of despotism, such as works in India, in our relations with the barbarism of South Africa" (Magubane 1996, citing Verschoyle [Vindex] 1900:450).

However the Cape's 1872 "responsible government" constitution still explicitly prohibited any discrimination on the basis of race or colour. Rhodes's Franchise and Ballot Act of 1892 got around this by raising the franchise qualifications, from the very low £25, to the significantly higher £75, disenfranchising the poorest classes of all race groups, but affecting a disproportionately large percentage of Black voters. Thus while some poor whites lost the vote, the even poorer Black and Coloured voting blocks suffered disproportionately. (Simons & Simons 1969: 50). The act also added an educational qualification, namely that voters needed to be literate. This was intended to disenfranchise the Cape's Xhosa electorate as, coming from a culture with an oral tradition, the majority of Xhosa voters were as yet illiterate.

As in 1887, the act faced strong opposition from parliamentary defenders of the original Cape constitution.

==== The Glen Grey Act (1894) ====
The Glen Grey Act was passed by the government of Cecil Rhodes in 1894 and stipulated a system of individual land holding for Black areas. It also complemented Sprigg's earlier discriminatory legislation by completely excluding property held under this new "Glen Grey title" as a voting qualification. (Davenport 1987: 108).

=== Union and the Cape Province (1910–1937) ===
The percentage of non-white voters by electoral district in the Cape Colony in 1908 on the eve of Union.

The successive restrictions of the preceding decades meant that by 1908, when the National Convention on Union was held, only "22,784 Native and Coloured persons out of a total of 152,221 electors" were entitled to vote in Cape elections, even though the franchise system was, at least in principle, still non-racial.

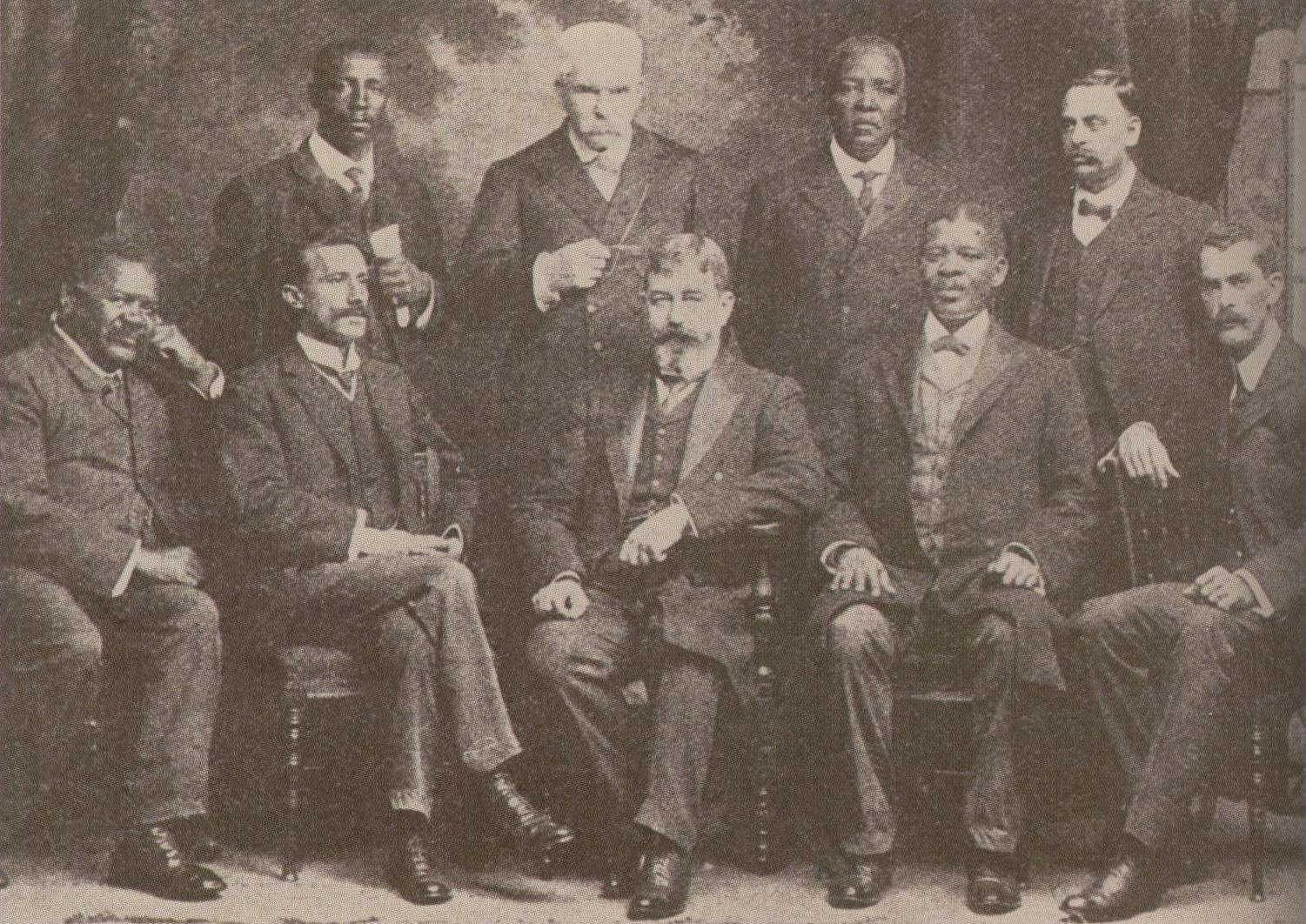
The Cape opposition delegation which lobbied the London Convention on Union for the multi-racial franchise. Present are prominent Cape politicians such as John Tengo Jabavu, William Schreiner, Walter Rubusana and Abdullah Abdurahman.

==== The South Africa Act (1909) ====
During the negotiations which drafted the South Africa Act on Union, the last Cape Prime Minister, the liberal John X. Merriman, fought unsuccessfully to have this multi-racial franchise system extended to the rest of South Africa. The attempt failed in the face of opposition from the white governments of the other constituent states, which were determined to entrench white rule. The final version of the South Africa Act permitted the Cape Province to keep a restricted version of its traditional franchise, whereby qualifications limited the suffrage of all citizens according to education and wealth. This led to the Cape being the only province in South Africa where coloureds (mixed-race people) and Black Africans could vote. The act also permitted the Parliament of South Africa to prescribe all other voting qualifications.

However, according to the Act, Parliament was given the power to change the Cape's voting requirements by a two-thirds vote. Overall the Act did little to protect black Africans, and ultimately enabled the later apartheid government to gradually whittle away and eventually abolish the Cape franchise.

==== Apartheid rule ====
Over the following years, legislation was passed by Parliament to slowly erode the remaining colour-blind voters roll. The 1929 and 1930 extensions of white voting rights were not granted to the non-white majority of the population. In 1931, the restricting franchise qualifications were removed for white voters, but kept in place for Black and "Coloured" voters. The white share of the vote was further augmented by the enfranchising of white women, as this was not extended to Black African or Coloured women. The result was a system in the Cape whereby the white population enjoyed universal adult franchise while the non-white population was still restricted by sex-, education-, and wealth-based qualifications.

By 1937, only a small number of black Africans in the Cape Province still remained on the common voters' roll. Under the Representation of Natives Act, 1936, three white members were elected to represent black voters in the province, with the voters' roll being limited to only 11 000. These seats were later abolished.

Similarly the coloured voters in Cape Province were removed from the common/general roll, under the Separate Representation of Voters Act, 1951. Although as the Act was challenged in what is known as the Coloured vote constitutional crisis, and not completely enforced until the later 1950s, the last year to see non-whites participate in a general election was in 1953. Coloured electors complying with qualifications were subsequently given four white MPs between 1958 and 1970. These seats were abolished in 1968 through the Separate Representation of Voters Amendment Act, 1968, enacted on behalf of Prime Minister B. J. Vorster.

This erased the last remnant of the Cape Qualified Franchise, and thus of any political representation for non-whites in South Africa.

== The Cape liberal tradition ==
The values of the early Cape constitution, of which the Cape Qualified Franchise was merely a result, became known in later years as the Cape Liberal tradition. After the fall of the Cape's political system, the severely weakened movement survived as an increasingly liberal, local opposition against the Apartheid government of the dominant National Party.

Principles such as a colour-blind political system, enforceable civil rights and an independent judiciary (as well as a growing belief in gender equality) became central features of this political tradition.

In their fight against Apartheid, the remaining proponents were progressively sidelined as organisations that more fully represented the Black African majority took the lead in the struggle for multiracial democracy. However, as effective allies against the growing Nationalist movement, there was a degree of collaboration and exchange of ideas between the remaining Cape liberals and the growing Black African liberation movements, especially in the early years of the struggle. Thus while the Cape liberals' own role became less relevant in the direction of the liberation movement, their non-racial values were successfully propagated by the political ancestors of the ANC, and came to reside at the centre of South Africa's post-Apartheid Constitution.

== See also ==
- Eastern Cape Separatist League
- Cape Independence
- Reconstruction era in the United States
  - Disfranchisement after the Reconstruction era
