= Robert Godlonton =

The Hon. Robert Godlonton
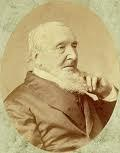

Member of the Legislative Council for the Eastern Division
- In office 1860s–1878 (also 1854 - 1858)

Personal details
- Born: 24 September 1794 London, Great Britain
- Died: 30 May 1884 (aged 89) Grahamstown, Cape Colony
- Party: Eastern Cape Separatist League (1854 to mid 1870s)
- Spouse(s): Mary Ann (died 1844); Sarah Richards (married 1845)
- Occupation: Printer, politician, businessman

Robert Godlonton (1794–1884) ("Moral Bob") was an influential politician of the Cape Colony. He was an 1820 Settler, who developed the press of the Eastern Cape and led the Eastern Cape separatist movement as a representative in the Cape's Legislative Council.

== Early life ==
Robert Godlonton was born in London on 24 September 1794. He was a weak and sickly child and after he was orphaned at the age of twelve he was apprenticed at a printing office.

He emigrated to the Cape as part of the 1820 Settlers, taking with him a small printing press. However, Governor Somerset, fearing the impact of a free press, confiscated the press and compensated the price.

== Business career and printing industry ==
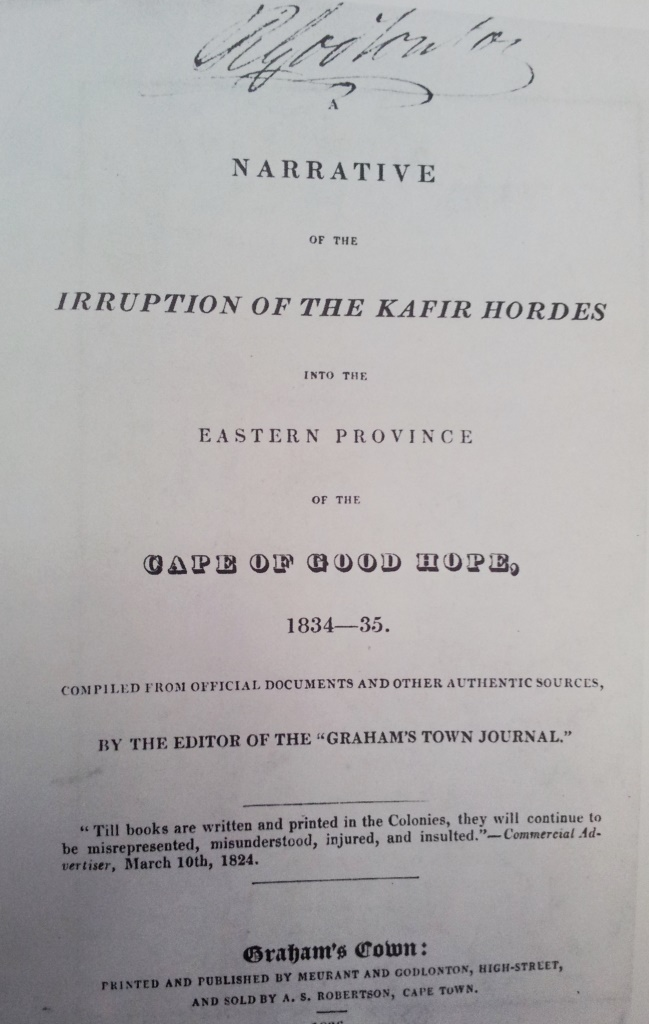
Signed copy of Robert Godlonton's publication in defence of settler grievances against the Xhosa and their liberal defenders in Cape Town.

After unsuccessful attempts at farming, he became a clerk at a landdrost's office and was gradually promoted over the next ten years.

The Cape was finally given freedom of the press in 1828, due largely to the efforts of the journalist and politician John Fairbairn. In 1834 Godlonton became partner in the Grahamstown Journal and in 1839 he took over the business. The firm, now renamed Godlonton & White, became the leading newspaper in the Eastern Cape. He eventually developed a wide range of business interests, but his primary activity remained newspapers and the printing industry. He gained a controlling stake in the Kingwilliamstown Gazette, the Uitenhage Times, the Queenstown Free Press, the Eastern Province Herald, the Eastern Province Monthly Magazine, the Friend of Bloemfontein, and Het Grahamstads Register en Boeren-vriend.

With the time and resources of his business success, he able to concentrate on additional personal publications, such as "Narrative of the Irruption of the Kafir Hordes (1836)" and "Notes on the Separation of the Eastern from the Western Province", proposing a stronger colonial policy against the neighbouring Xhosa and calling for more British immigration to the Eastern Cape to bolster its European population.

== Political career ==
Godlonton began to involve himself in politics soon after he arrived in the Cape. He took an active role in the frontier wars as member of the board of defence and, although never elected a municipal commissioner, he diligently attended town and committee meetings in the area. Later, as his business enterprises grew, he began to take a much stronger role in Cape politics.

=== Confrontation with Lieut-Governor Stockenström ===
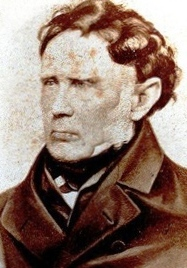
1st Baronet Sir Andries Stockenström, military leader and architect of a system of peace treaties with the neighbouring Xhosa Chiefs.

Godlonton's early political career was taken up by a long campaign against the Lieutenant-Governor of the Eastern Cape, Andries Stockenström.

Stockenström, who professed considerable respect for the Xhosa, had developed a completely new frontier policy that involved the exchange of diplomatic agents as reliable "ambassadors" between the Cape Colony and the Xhosa Chiefs. This system was underlain by formal treaties to guard the border and return any stolen cattle from either side. Importantly, Stockenström forbade colonial expansion into Xhosa land. With this key provision, the treaty system soon brought a degree of peace to the frontier.

However many frontier colonists resented Stockenström's restrictions on their expansion into Xhosa land. As one settler ominously remarked of the Xhosa lands: "The appearance of the country is very fine, it will make excellent sheep farms."

Godlonton swiftly came to the forefront as the leader of this Eastern Cape settler movement. He used his newspapers to condemn Stockenström's treaty system and advocate seizing the Xhosa lands. He also used his considerable influence in the religious institutions of the 1820 Settlers to drive his opinions, declaring that "the British race was selected by God himself to colonise Kaffraria". In the face of massive pressure and ruinous lawsuits, Stockenström was eventually dismissed and his treaty system was dismantled by Governor Maitland. A fresh wave of frontier conflicts soon broke out, eventually building up to the Amatola War which erupted in 1846.

Stockenström died soon afterwards but crucially, Godlonton's attacks on him and his treaty system made an opponent of Stockenström's friend and ally John Molteno, who would come to confront Godlonton's political movement decades later.

=== Leader of the Eastern Cape Separatists ===
From his leadership of the frontier settlers' attacks on Stockenstrom's treaty system, Godlonton had acquired a very prominent and powerful position in the Eastern Cape. In the 1840s he thus began to take on the role of self-appointed leader of the Eastern Cape separatist movement. This movement accused the Cape Town-based government of being overly lenient in its frontier policy, and called for the political capital to be moved to a city nearer the frontier or, barring that, for the Eastern Cape to be allowed to secede as a separate state. It also supported greater British imperial involvement in southern Africa.

In 1849 – 50 Godlonton took a controversial stand in support of Governor Smith's attempt to use the Cape as a penal colony. In the wake of this "Convict Crisis", the Governor appointed him to the Cape's Legislative Council, resulting in the other Council members resigning en masse in protest. Godlonton also unsuccessfully opposed the implementation of the multi-racial Cape Qualified Franchise in 1851/2.

In 1854, the Cape was granted its first parliament, with the old Legislative Council becoming an elected upper house – sharply divided between representatives of the Eastern and Western Cape. Godlonton represented the Eastern Cape in this new Legislative Council for the next 25 years.

In the new parliament, Godlonton led the separatist cause in the upper house of parliament, while his colleague John Paterson led the movement in the lower house.

=== Opposition to responsible government ===
Meanwhile, Stockenström's old protege, Molteno, claiming direct British rule in southern Africa to be unjust and inept, was leading a growing movement for "Responsible Government", to make the Cape's Executive democratically accountable (or "responsible" as it was known), and thus give the Cape a degree of independence from Britain. As this movement grew in power throughout the 1860s, Godlonton redirected his considerable resources towards opposing it. Finally, as a member of the Legislative Council, he chaired the 1871 Commission on Federal Devolution in a last-ditch attempt to split the Cape and weaken the Responsible Government movement, but the following year Molteno gained parliamentary control and became the Cape's first Prime Minister.

The new Prime Minister immediately included several representatives of the Eastern Cape into his government. This, together with the rising economic prosperity of the Cape and the Seven Circles Bill (May 1874) finally extinguished the separatist movement. Godlonton was permitted to retain his parliamentary seat until its dissolution in 1878.

== Legacy ==
Godlonton's role as the press advocate of Eastern Cape frontier opinion mirrored the powerful role that John Fairbairn (and later Saul Solomon) played as leading press advocates of Western Cape liberal opinion.

He was immensely influential for his work in elaborating on and immortalising the trials and grievances of the 1820 Settlers. His influence on frontier historiography was far greater than his effects on the affairs of his day. During his lifetime his political movement was largely thwarted, and he was eventually out-maneuvered by his Western Cape opponents, nonetheless in years to come his legacy was to survive and influence the expansionist policies of the later Progressive Party.

== Later life and family ==
Robert Godlonton was outspoken in his beliefs and earned the nickname "Moral Bob". He was a staunch Methodist, like a great many of the 1820 settlers of the Eastern Cape, who was strongly involved in Church and Missionary activity. He was a prominent leader of the Cape's Methodist community, friends with other powerful churchmen such as John Ayliff, Henry Hare Dugmore and Henry Calderwood among others and, together with such men, formed a powerful business clique. They also formed the majority of the municipal commissioners in the Eastern Cape.

His first wife, Mary Ann, died in 1844, and the following year he married his second wife Sarah Richards.

He died in Grahamstown on 30 May 1884.

== Publications ==
- A Narrative of the Irruption of the Kafir Hordes Into the Eastern Province of the Cape of Good Hope, 1834-35: Compiled from Official Documents and Other Authentic Sources. Meurant and Godlonton. 1836.
- Sketches of the Eastern Districts of the Cape of Good Hope: As They are in 1842. Office of the Graham's Town Journal. 1842.
- Memorials of the British Settlers of South Africa: Being the Records of Public Services, Held at Graham's Town and Port Elizabeth on the 10th of April, and at Bathurst on the 10th May, 1844 in Commemoration of Their Landing in Algoa Bay, and Foundation of the Settlement of Albany in the Year 1820. R. Godlonton, printer. 1844.
- Review of the Condition of the Frontier Hottentots from 1799-1851, and of the Incipient Stages of the Rebellion of the Latter Year. Godlonton & White.

== Notes and references ==
- Ross, Robert (1999). Status and Respectability in the Cape Colony, 1750–1870: A Tragedy of Manners. Cambridge University Press. ISBN 978-1-139-42561-2.
- Molteno, Percy Alport (1900). The Life and Times of Sir John Charles Molteno, K.C.M.G., First Premier of Cape Colony: Comprising a History of Representative Institutions and Responsible Government at the Cape and of Lord Carnarvon's Confederation Policy & of Sir Bartle Frere's... London: Smith, Elder & Co. ISBN 978-1-277-74131-5.
- Anon (2010). "A Quest for a Treaty Stockenstrom, Godlonton And Bowker". New History. Archived from the original on 16 March 2014.
