= Charles William Hutton =

Cape Colony politician

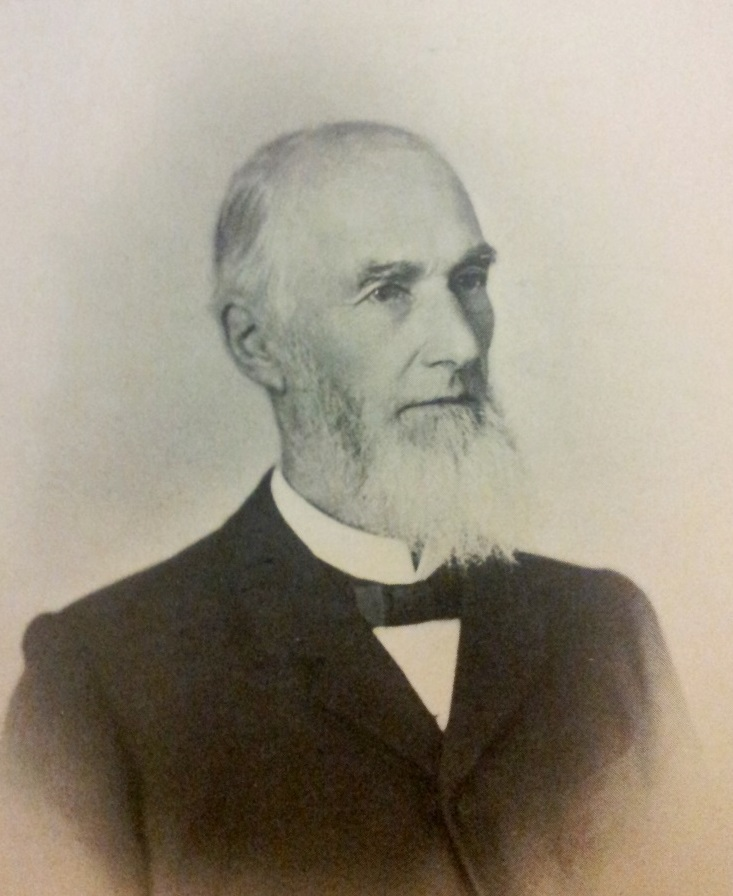
Charles William Hutton - Cape Colony Treasurer General

Charles William Hutton MLC (13 July 1826 – 1 February 1905) was a Member of the Cape Legislative Council and the country's Treasurer General during the Government of Prime Minister Thomas Scanlen.

== Early life ==
The second son of the Rev. Henry Hutton, sometime Rector of Filleigh, Devon, born on 13 July 1826, in Beaumont, Essex, Hutton left England and arrived in Port Elizabeth in March 1844 with his elder brother Henry. The two brothers intended to work as sheep farmers.

He first began work as a sheep-shearer, then found work on John Pringle's farm "Glen Thorn". He then managed the farm "Klip Kraal", near Cradock, which belonged to the great Baronet and frontier leader Sir Andries Stockenström. At this time he also became an overall assistant to Stockenström. It was there that he met Stockenstrom's eldest daughter Elizabeth Maria Henrietta, who was later to become his wife in 1852, when they married at St Saviours in Claremont, Cape Town.

In the 1850s he studied privately, whilst working, eventually becoming qualified as a notary public and sworn translator in Somerset East.

He moved to Bedford in 1856 to start a business as auctioneer. Then as Justice of the peace he eventually published several compilations of laws and legal reports - particularly pertaining to liquor laws. He eventually became Esquire of Stockdale, Somerset East.

== Political career ==
=== Orange Free State ===
In the 1860s and 70s he served in the Volksraad (parliament) of the Orange Free State, which was at the time an independent republic. In 1869, he headed a commission that demarcated the Free State's borders with the Cape Colony. In 1870, he was deputed by the Volksraad, together with Johannes Brand, to argue the case of the Free State for possession of the diamond fields of Griqualand West.

=== Legislative Council and Treasurer (1879-1884) ===
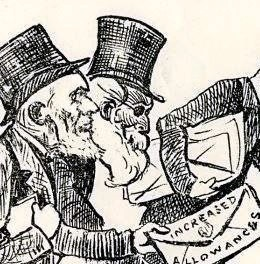
Hutton (far left) caricatured as Treasurer in 1882. Colonial Secretary Molteno is visible beside him in sunglasses.

He was elected to the Cape Parliament in 1878, as the Member for the North Eastern Circle (Province) in the upper Legislative Council.

On the fall of the disastrous government of Prime Minister John Gordon Sprigg, locally-born Thomas Charles Scanlen took over government of the Cape of Good Hope. In 1881, he selected Hutton as his Treasurer General, with the job of recovering the country's collapsed finances, devastated by the wars and mismanagement of the previous Ministry. Hutton was faced by a massive shortfall in government revenue and a large accumulation of debt. He worked closely with the architect of Responsible Government, the Cape's first Prime Minister John Molteno, who briefly came out of retirement to assist him and Scanlen. By the end of the following year the government's finances were overhauled and the deficit was largely under control.

In spite of his relative success as Treasurer, he lost his constituency seat in the Legislative Council at the end of 1883 and consequently his government position by February 1884. He was replaced by the young Cecil Rhodes, an ambitious imperialist who detested the cautious Hutton (referring to him in his letters as an "Old Woman").

=== Interlude ===
After retiring from government, Hutton edited the autobiography of his father-in-law Stockenstrom in 1887. He also became a trustee for Gill College in Somerset East. At this time he also moved permanently to Cape Town, where he bought and built up the property "Sandown Lodge" in Rondebosch.

=== Legislative Assembly and Opposition (1886-1898) ===
He was re-elected in 1886, this time to the Legislative Assembly (lower house) representing the district of Fort Beaufort, and was one of the chief critics of the government of Cecil Rhodes in the 1890s. Hutton was a strong and consistent advocate for expanded rights and representation for the Black African citizens of the Cape. In fighting Rhodes, and particularly Rhodes's discriminatory "native policy", he joined a small but powerful group of liberal leaders, comprising John X. Merriman, JW Sauer, James Rose Innes, John Molteno and William Hay. Hutton was a frequent speaker, known as a reasonable moderate. He gave up his seat when he decided not to stand in the 1898 election.

== Later life ==
Hutton died in 1905, leaving a portion of his estate to become a scholarship at Lovedale College (the "Hutton Scholarship")
