= Seven Circles Act =

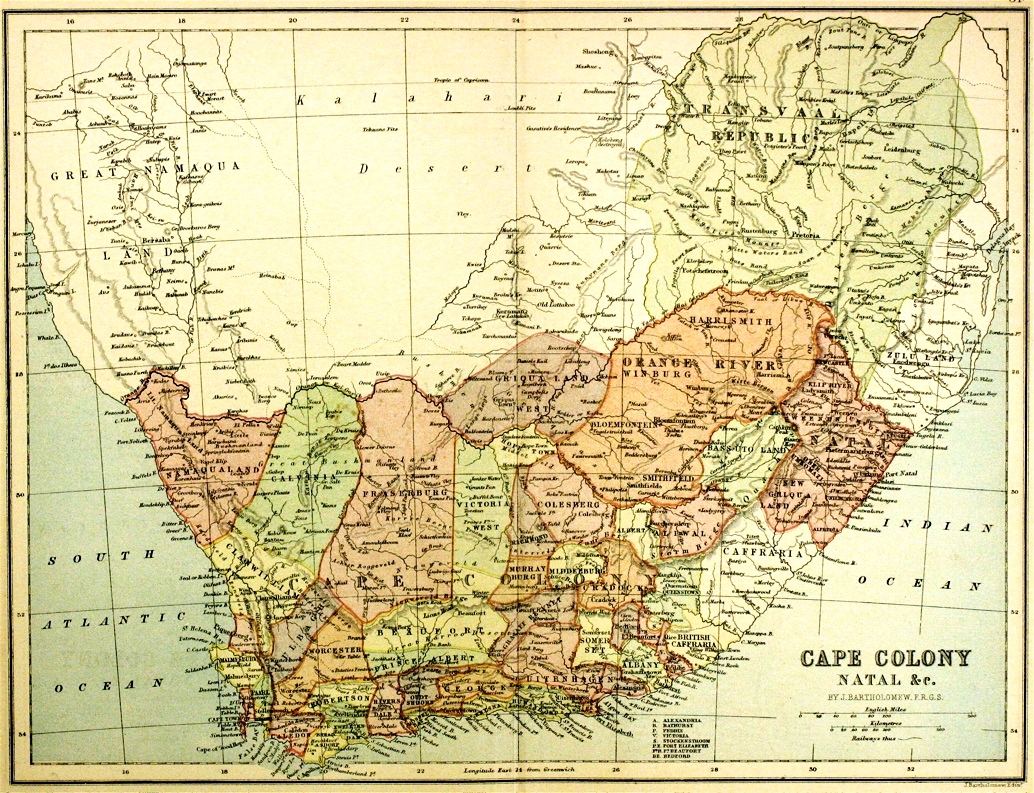
1876 map of the Cape Colony, showing the new electoral divisions or "circles".

The Seven Circles Act, 1874, was an act of the Cape Parliament that divided the Cape Colony into seven provinces (or "circles") for the Legislative Council elections.

Previously, the country had been divided into two large provinces, the Western and the Eastern Provinces, which had led to decades of polarisation and competition. The act was important in that it ended the bitter political schism that had divided the Cape for much of the 19th century. It formed part of the 1874 Constitutional Amendment Bill.

== Background ==
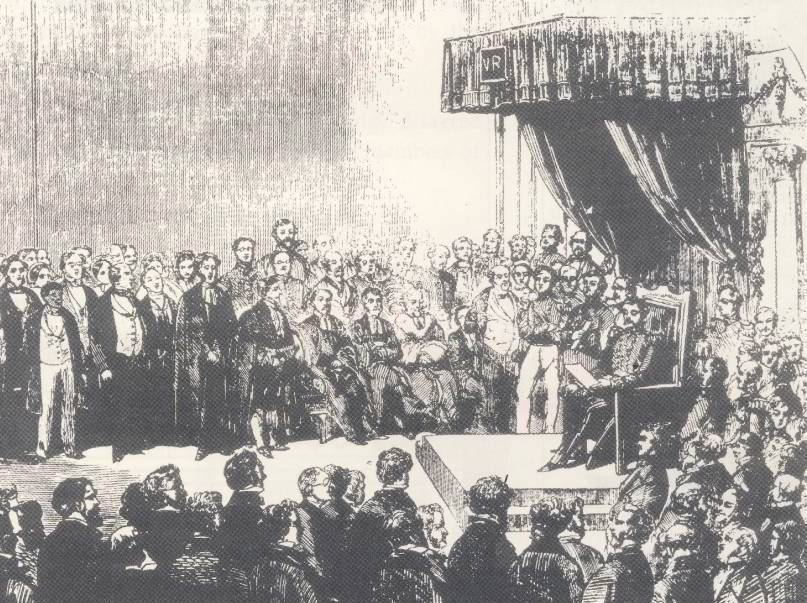
The Cape Parliament, 1854.

The Parliament of the Cape of Good Hope was bicameral, with a lower house (Legislative Assembly) and an upper house (Legislative Council). The latter had considerable power and influence on the lower house, and was elected according to two large provinces:

- The Western Province, centred on Cape Town
- The Eastern Province, centred on Port Elizabeth

=== The Western Province ===
The Western Province was larger, and was the seat of the country's capital city, Cape Town, however the electoral system gave the two entities near equal political power. (The Western province had only two more seats than the Eastern, though its voting population was very much larger.) The result was political competition, which gradually evolved into growing regional political parties, and then into severe polarisation between the two provinces. The instability of the system often paralyzed government.

=== The Eastern Province ===
In fear of dominance by Cape Town, the Eastern Province leaders came to demand greater British Imperial control, and a long-running separatist movement arose. Persistent disputes included frontier issues, with the Eastern Province leaders favouring a far harsher and more expansionist policy towards the neighbouring Xhosa people. The Western Province was dominated by liberals who were less expansionist and were accused by Eastern leaders of favouring the Xhosa in their frontier policy. The deadlock and regional polarisation was complicated by the division between the Eastern towns of Port Elizabeth and Grahamstown, which began competing for political dominance within the Eastern Province.

== Earlier political developments ==
=== Representative government (1854–1872) ===
The Cape at the time ran a system of representative government, whereby the legislature was elected, but executive power remained firmly in the hands of an unelected British Governor, who was appointed by the British Colonial Office. A resulting lack of accountability led to budget mismanagement and economic stagnation. Distrust of the Governor also led to a deadlock between the elected parliament and the unelected executive. Popular distrust also scuppered Governor Wodehouse's prior attempt (1869) to redraw the electoral districts (this was to be done by abolishing the lower house and establishing a system of alternating councils with 6 electoral districts and greater British control of nominations).

=== Responsible government (1872) ===
A movement began in the Western Province to make the Executive elected and therefore accountable (or "responsible") to the local electorate. This movement for "Responsible Government" was opposed by the Eastern leaders who feared Western Province domination (as well as by conservatives in the West). However, the split in the Eastern Province party between Grahamstown and Port Elizabeth, together with the mobilisation of small but growing electoral minorities such as Black African voters (who generally supported the Western Province party), allowed the Western-based leader John Molteno to institute Responsible Government in 1872.

== Factors favouring the change ==
From the outset, a serious problem was that the two constituencies were geographically so enormous, that it was practically impossible for any candidate to canvas the electorate across a significant area of their province. Such impracticalities, as well as irregularities that caused just two cities (Cape Town and Grahamstown) to account for over 50% of the electoral strength in their respective provinces, meant that interest in the Council elections was minimal.

Therefore, while the Council wielded significant power in the country, it was correctly perceived to be remote and far-removed from the electorate. It was also widely seen as unaccountable.

In addition, the demographics of the country had substantially changed since the original provinces were constituted, in size, in economic development, and in distribution. The two provinces were therefore even more impractical as electoral districts.

However the primary reason that the change was proposed, was the aforementioned polarisation which resulted from having only two provinces of near equal power.

== Passing of the bill (1873–74) ==
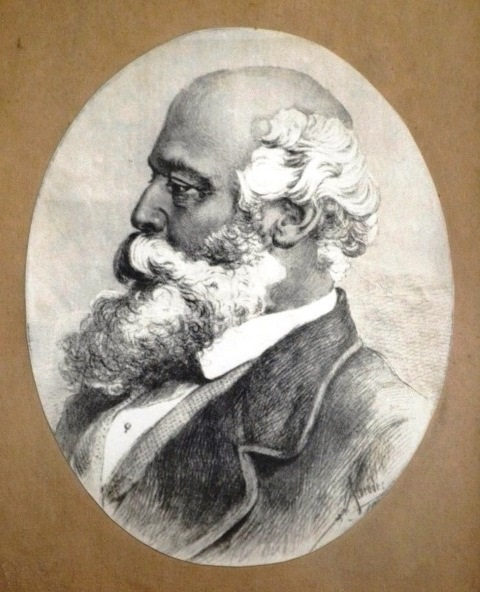
The new Prime Minister, John Molteno

In April 1873, Molteno (now the country's first Prime Minister) put forward the Seven Circles Bill for the first time. His government's declared policy of fighting racial and regional divisions in the country led it to believe that the only way to dilute the two-way regional polarisation was to re-draw the country's electoral divisions. The inadequacy of the current system was widely acknowledged and the act passed in the Legislative Assembly with a large majority. However in the upper house the Council's president used his casting vote to throw the bill out.

In May 1874, the act was reintroduced. The Easterners were led by "Jock" Paterson in the Assembly, and by "Moral Bob" Godlonton in the Council. Both fought the bill unsuccessfully. It was once again carried by a large majority in the Assembly and, on reaching the upper house, was passed with a comfortable majority this time.

The final objection raised by the remaining Eastern Province leaders was that the resulting upper house would in no way resemble the British Westminster House of Lords model. The government's response was that the Cape did not possess, nor should it strive to possess, Lords or any other form of hereditary aristocracy. Molteno himself argued that the Council had a very real authority and power over the country, and that "...it is a serious danger for a body with so much power to be out of touch with the people." It was therefore necessary to build a connection with the electorate "…so real as to excite the interest of the masses of the people." For "…the greater the interest of the people in their representatives and the closer they are in touch with them, the more valuable are the results of representative institutions likely to prove."

Though the act passed into law in 1874, the first election to take place under the new system was only in November 1878.

== Provisions ==
The act divided the Cape of Good Hope into seven electoral provinces (or "circles"), with each being entitled to elect three representatives to the Legislative Council. The seven electoral divisions were (a) the Western electoral province consisting of the electoral divisions of Gape Town, Cape Division, Stellenbosch and Paarl; (b) the North Western province consisting of Worcester, Malmesbury, Piquetberg, Namaqualand and Clanwilliam; (c) the South Western province consisting of Swellendam, Caledon, Riversdale, Oudtshoorn and George; (d) the Midland province consisting of Graaff-Reinet, Richmond, Beaufort West and Victoria West; (e) the South Eastern province consisting of Port Elizabeth, Uitenhage, Grahamstown, Albany and Victoria East; (f) the North Eastern province consisting of Somerset East, Fort Beaufort, Craddock, Colesberg and Albert and (g) the Eastern electoral province consisting of King Williamstown, East London, Queenstown, Aliwal North and Wodehouse.

In subdividing the country, Molteno had decided that seven was a sufficiently high number to allow for stable disagreement between the divisions, without causing lasting polarisation. He had insisted on an uneven number so as to avoid political deadlock, and had rejected an earlier suggestion of three, as it would allow for a persistent marginalisation of one of the three. A proposal for five was worked out in details but more minor objections were raised, and in the end it was decided that seven was the ideal number so as to ensure stability.

The change, together with the overall rising prosperity of the country, finally ended the regional rivalry between East & West, and put an end to the ongoing Separatist movement of the Eastern Province. In effect, it also ended the Western Province's political hegemony over the country, by dispersing the electoral entities.

The effects were also to eliminate the previous disproportionate advantage which the towns of Cape Town and Grahamstown had wielded under the previous system, whereby they had secured an unfairly large proportion of the votes, relative to their population.

In electing members, the voter was given three votes, which could be all given to one candidate, or distributed to three candidates. This was intended to secure the representation of minorities.

Representatives were elected for seven years (as opposed to the ten years under the previous system) and were to be voted in simultaneously at one time. The Presidency of the Legislative Council was still to be taken by the country's Chief Justice.
