= Calderwood, South Africa =

Calderwood
- Location within Eastern Cape Location within South Africa
- Coordinates: 32°51′25″S 26°43′43″E
- Country: South Africa
- Province: Eastern Cape
- District: Amathole
- Municipality: Raymond Mhlaba

Area
  - Total: 0.24 km^{2} (0.093 sq mi)

Population (2011)
  - Total: 197
  - Density: 820/km^{2} (2,100/sq mi)

Racial makeup (2011)
  - Black African: 100.0%

First languages (2011)
  - Xhosa: 94.4%
  - English: 3.6%
  - Sotho: 1.0%
  - Other: 1.0%
- Time zone: UTC+2 (SAST)

Calderwood is a village in Amathole District Municipality in the Eastern Cape province of South Africa.

Settlement some 12 kilometres (7.5 mi) south-east of Fort Beaufort and 16 kilometres (9.9 mi) south-west of Alice. It was named after Henry Calderwood of the London Missionary Society, author of Caffres and Caffre Missions.
