= Andries Stockenström =

British colonial administrator (1792-1864)

Sir Andries Stockenström 1st Baronet
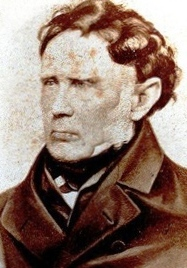
- Sir Andries Stockenström, 1st Baronet

Lieutenant governor
- In office 13 September 1836 – 9 August 1838
- Succeeded by: Col. John Hare
- Constituency: Eastern Province of Cape Colony

Personal details
- Born: 6 July 1792 Cape Town, Western Cape, South Africa
- Died: 16 March 1864 (aged 71) London, England
- Resting place: Kensal Green Cemetery

Sir Andries Stockenström, 1st Baronet, (6 July 1792 in Cape Town – 16 March 1864 in London) was lieutenant governor of the Eastern Province of the Cape Colony from 13 September 1836 to 9 August 1838.

His efforts in restraining colonists from moving into Xhosa lands served to make him immensely unpopular among the settlers of the Cape Colony frontier. As a historical figure, he long remained controversial in South Africa for supposedly hindering colonisation, and pro-imperialist histories have traditionally vilified him. However his relatively far-sighted and respectful policies towards the Xhosa have increasingly gained recognition in modern South Africa.

On Stockenström's legacy, historian Christopher Saunders concluded: "No man in the 19th century Cape had greater breadth of vision, none gained the respect of a wider constituency, black as well as white."

== Early life ==
The eldest son of Anders Stockenström (1757-1811), a Cape landdrost of Swedish ancestry, he received an elementary education in Cape Town and in 1808 took up an appointment as clerk in his father's office at Graaff-Reinet. En route he met up with Lt-Col R Collins and accompanied him as a Dutch interpreter on a journey that took them to the Orange River and into the Xhosa country. Inclined to pursue a military career, Andries accompanied the expedition sent in 1810 to inform Ndlambe, the Rharhabe paramount chief, of the government's aim to expel him from the Zuurveld.

== Military career ==
In the 19th century, the Cape frontier was afflicted by a recurring series of Frontier Wars, between the Cape Colony on the one side, and the Xhosa chiefs on the other. Stockenström's military career additionally saw growing disagreement between the leadership of the local Cape forces (the Burgher commandos) and the settlers on the frontier who supported greater imperial control.

While the young Stockenström was a great and sometimes ruthless soldier in the frontier wars, in the coming years he came to develop a growing sympathy with his Xhosa opponents. The frontier policy of the colonial government at the time was the so-called "Reprisals System", whereby frontier settlers were permitted to cross the border to reclaim stolen cattle from any Xhosa settlement to which the cattle-tracks led – even if the stolen cattle were not in fact there. Stockenström was fiercely opposed to this system. His opinion that the Cape Colony colonists of the frontier were unfairly treating of their Xhosa neighbours led to his later conclusion that a strictly enforced system of treaties must be enforced on both sides in order for peace and mutual respect to develop.

=== The 4th Frontier War (1811-1812) ===
In 1811 he was commissioned as an ensign in the Cape Regiment, took part in the 4th Cape Frontier War (1811–12), and in the campaign against Ndlambe. During this time, Andries served as aide-de-camp to his father, Anders Stockenström.

When his father was ambushed and killed, the young Andries rode from Bruintjieshoogte with 18 mounted burghers. He hunted down and overtook a number of the killers near Doringnek, slaying 13 of them.

Upon returning from Doringnek, Andries was appointed to his father's position in command of the burgher forces. Following Ndlambe's expulsion, he assisted Colonel John Graham in fortifying the Fish River frontier. Governor Sir John Cradock then appointed him as assistant landdrost of Graaff-Reinet, stationed initially at Van Stadensdam on the (upper) Fish River, and afterwards at the newly founded town of Cradock. Andries retained his commission as his duties remained mostly of a military nature.

In a rapid and successful campaign in 1813, he struck across the Fish River against Xhosa tribes that had violated the new frontier, and in May 1814 he was appointed a lieutenant in the Cape Regiment. He rose through the ranks rapidly after fighting in the fourth frontier war.

=== The 5th Frontier War (1818-1819) ===
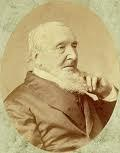
Robert Godlonton ("Moral Bob") led a legal and press campaign against Stockenström that would continue for much of the remainder of his career.

Due in part to overcrowding, a civil war broke out between the amaNgqika (Ngqika Xhosa) and the amaGcaleka (Gcaleka Xhosa). As the Cape had signed a defence treaty with Ngqika, it was legally required to respond to Ngqika's request for military assistance in 1818. Stockenström was thus ordered to lead his commando, as an ally of Ngqika, against Ndlambe's amaGcaleka.

After swiftly intercepting and defeating the Gcaleka army, he withdrew his commando and stationed his Graaff-Reinet burghers to defend the left flank at the Kat River. However, after the Cape withdrawal, the amaGcaleka regrouped in 1819 and this time invaded the Cape Colony itself, attacking Grahamstown.

Stockenström thus took to the field again. He was first ordered to position his Graaff-Reinet commando to meet any attack across the northern section of the frontier. Then while the Cape, Stellenbosch and Swellendam commandos advanced against the main amaGcaleka army, Stockenström's Graaff-Reinet commando was ordered to clear insurgents from the dense bush in the Fish River area – previously regarded as impenetrable. After successfully implementing this supposedly impossible campaign, Stockenström was promoted to captain in the Cape Regiment.

The war ended in October 1819, when Gcaleka agreed to recognise Ngqika's independent leadership of the Western Xhosa, and the area between the Keiskamma and Fish rivers was declared a neutral zone, closed off from both black and white settlement.

From about this period, Stockenström's relationship with Governor Lord Charles Somerset declined, in part because of his "outspoken criticism of Somerset’s frontier policy or his refusal to allow the settlement of the 1820 Settlers in his district and his opposition to their location on the frontier", Duminy suggests, and in part because of a quarrel with the Governor's son, Col. Henry Somerset. In addition, Stockenström was friendly with Acting Governor Sir Rufane Donkin, and since Grahamstown editor Robert Godlonton was a staunch supporter of Col. Somerset, this "meant that the remainder of his public career was characterized by personal and political feuds".

His military career ended in July 1820 when he was transferred to the Corsican Rangers. The Graaff-Reinet district's involvement with the frontier was also reduced by the creation in 1821 of the separate district of Albany (out of Uitenhage) and in 1826 of the district of Somerset East (out of Graaff-Reinet). However Stockenström remained landdrost until the reform of 1828 which abolished his office.

In his final year as landdrost, he played a significant role in the Cape by lobbying for Ordinance 50 (1828) to grant the right to own land to the Khoikhoi and all other free black inhabitants of the Cape. A project that led to his later establishing of the Kat River Khoi Settlement.

=== Commissioner-General for the Eastern Province (1829-1833) ===
In 1827 the Council of Advice was enlarged to include two unofficial members, and in June that year Stockenström was appointed to fill one of these positions. Early in 1829 Major-General Richard Bourke, who had arrived in the colony in 1826 as lieutenant-governor of the Eastern Province, but instead became acting governor when Lord Charles Somerset departed, appointed Stockenström to the new post of commissioner-general for the Eastern Province.

==== The Kat River Khoi Settlement ====
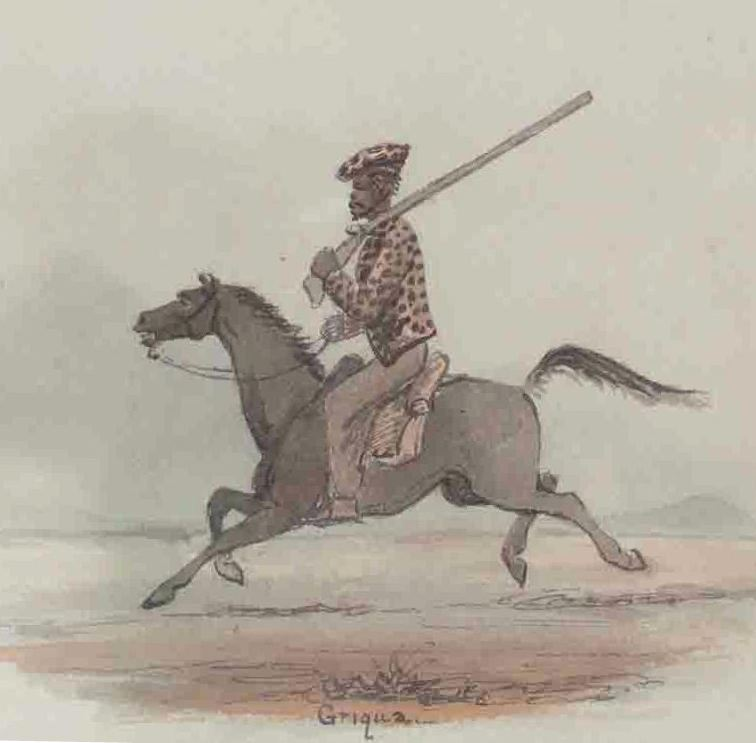
A Khoikhoi gunman from the frontier wars.

In spite of the many political hindrances to his actions, Stockenström nonetheless set to work to reach an agreement for peace on the frontier and to stabilise the Ceded Territory between the Fish and Keiskamma rivers.

He decided to set aside this extensive and very fertile area for settlement, not by the white settlers of the frontier, but by the Cape's extensive Khoi and Griqua population. Some of Stockenström's top commanders were Khoi; he had long fought alongside Khoi soldiers in the frontier wars, and claimed to hold their bravery and loyalty in high esteem. He granted this displaced and marginalised people full and equal rights of land ownership and facilitated the establishment of their settlement, in what became known as the "Kat River Khoi Settlement".

The settlements expanded, and the Kat River Settlement became a region of the Cape that functioned largely autonomously from the rest of the country. Stockenström later described the creation of this settlement as his primary achievement.

==== Frontier policy ====
Cattle raiding across the frontier, by both sides, was a persistent cause for frontier violence. For this reason, Stockenström promulgated new regulations dealing with the recovery of stolen stock. The previous "Reprisals System" of the frontier meant that the reaction to a cattle raid was simply to launch a counter-raid. Stockenström ruled that armed parties were only permitted to cross the frontier and recover stolen stock by force if the civil authorities gave permission.

This policy nonetheless proved to be very problematic because, when deciding whether to authorise punitive action, Stockenström depended on information from sources which were often unreliable. In 1830 Stockenström permitted settlers to launch a punitive expedition against Tyali, having been shown evidence that this Xhosa chief was led raids across the border. However, the expedition resulted in the shooting of another chief, Zeko, which caused considerable controversy. Based on false information, Stockenström had at first commended Field Commandant Erasmus for his conduct, but later investigations showed that reports of Zeko being armed and removing livestock were false.

Faced with growing demands for punitive expeditions, Stockenström became increasingly suspicious of the motives of Col Somerset and the frontier settler group. The issue became critical in June 1831, when the colonial government directly authorised Somerset to launch an attack on the Xhosa, without Stockenström's permission and in spite of his objections.

Stockenström became increasingly critical of the frontier policy implemented, both in his reports from Graaff-Reinet and in the proceedings of the Council of Advice. After Lord Stanley, Secretary for the Colonies, requested his resignation from the council, Stockenström left the Cape in 1833 and traveled to London where he resigned as Commissioner-General, after having failed to persuade the Colonial Office to give him more independence in his frontier work.

He moved from London to Sweden – his ancestral home – in 1834 and, at roughly the same time, the Sixth Frontier War broke out in the Cape.

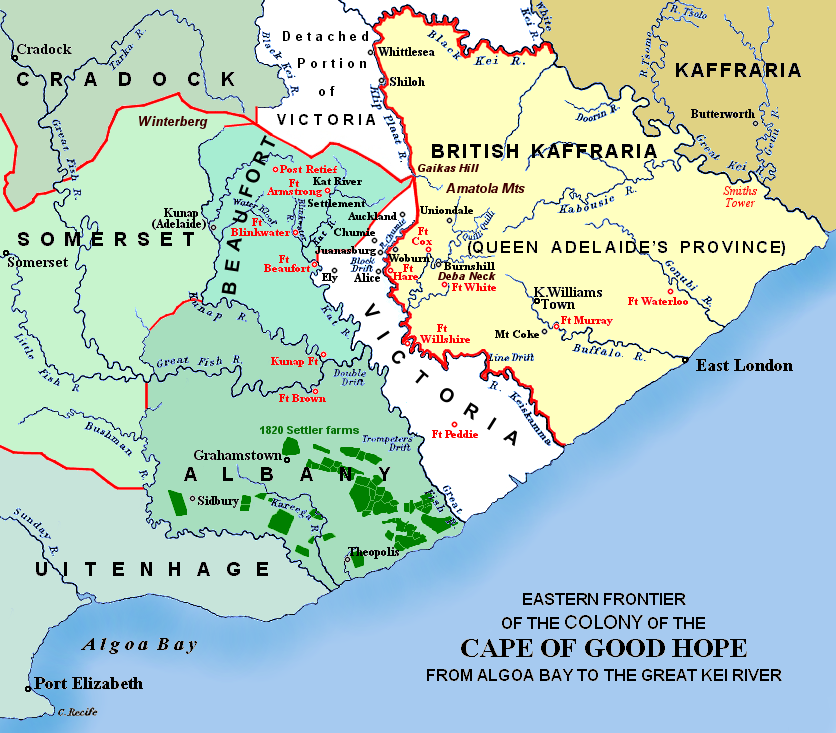
The Eastern Frontier, ca 1835

=== Lieutenant-Governor of the Eastern Province (1836-1838) ===
In August 1835 he travelled to London to give evidence to the House of Commons on relations with the Xhosa in Southern Africa. In a hugely influential testimony, he blamed imperial policies and the frontier settlers' behaviour for causing repeated outbreaks of war with the Xhosa. In particular, the settlers' use of raids into Xhosa territory, to attack suspected cattle thieves.

His opinions – though hugely controversial – impressed the new Secretary for the Colonies, Lord Glenelg, who appointed him Lieutenant-Governor of the Eastern Province.

==== New frontier policy ====
As lieutenant-governor, Stockenström now had the ability to construct a completely new policy for Cape-Xhosa relations.

He began by returning the recently annexed "Province of Queen Adelaide" to the Xhosa. He then instituted his own unique treaty system, recognising the Xhosa chiefs as independent and equal authorities in his diplomacy.

This system involved the exchange of diplomatic agents as reliable "ambassadors" between the Cape Colony and the Xhosa chiefs. The diplomatic agent system was underlain by formal treaties to guard the border and return any stolen cattle from either side. Importantly, Stockenström forbade colonial expansion into Xhosa land. With this key provision, the treaty system soon brought a degree of peace to the frontier.

In his frontier policy, Stockenström was also in disagreement with the liberals and philanthropists of the Cape, in that he believed that the authority of the chiefs must be preserved, and that the relations of the borderlands needed to be strictly regulated and policed.

==== Legal pressure and decline of the treaty system ====
However many frontier colonists resented Stockenström's restrictions on their expansion into Xhosa land. The Eastern Cape settler movement, which advocated dismantling Stockenström's treaty system and annexing the Xhosa land, was led by Godlonton and Col Somerset. This movement increasingly conducted a virulent and libellous campaign against Stockenström and his treaty system.

Godlonton had control of the most influential newspapers of the frontier region, and used them to advocate for his campaign. Godlonton also used his considerable influence in the religious institutions of the 1820 settlers to drive his opinions, declaring that the settlers were "selected by God himself to colonize Kaffraria".

Officially, Stockenström was also beset by the problem that, as lieutenant-governor, he was still legally dependent on Sir Benjamin d’Urban, the overall Governor of the Cape, who resented the fact that he had been overlooked when the British parliament authorised Stockenström to take over the frontier. An additional problem was that he also still lacked authority over the military.

Under immense pressure from the frontier settlers' press campaign, Stockenström became increasingly drawn into a series of bitter legal battles. In February 1838 he started a libel action, after being publicly accused of murder, and requested the new governor, Sir George Napier, to launch a full inquiry. Stockenström was exonerated by the court of inquiry in June 1838, but nonetheless felt his position hopeless, and travelled to Britain to consult Glenelg. Glenelg refused to accept Stockenström's resignation, but his successor, Lord Normanby, dismissed Stockenström in August 1839.

Dispirited, Stockenström returned to the Cape in May 1840 and retired to his farm Klipkraal (in the Swaershoek Valley near Somerset East), making only occasional trips to Uitenhage and Cape Town.

In 1842, a severe drought affected the region, causing an increase in cross-border cattle raiding. This, together with the growing neglect of Stockenström's treaty system, began to lead to growing violence along the frontier.

In 1844, the new governor of the Cape, Sir Peregrine Maitland, abolished Stockenström's treaty system altogether, imposing instead a unilateral system of more severe treaties. Certain provisions of the new treaty system, such as those allowing frontier settlers to counter-raid their Xhosa neighbours if they believed that cattle had been stolen, led to a sharp increase in violence. Maitland's system also involved building a system of military fortifications on Xhosa lands so as to secure the frontier militarily.

The new governor also began to settle Mfengu in frontier Xhosa territory, and opened parts of it up for permanent white settlement.

Aware of impending war, in 1845 Stockenström moved to his farm Maasström, at the foot of the Kaga Mountains, where he remained until April 1846 when the Seventh Frontier War broke out.

=== The 7th Frontier War (1846-1847) ===
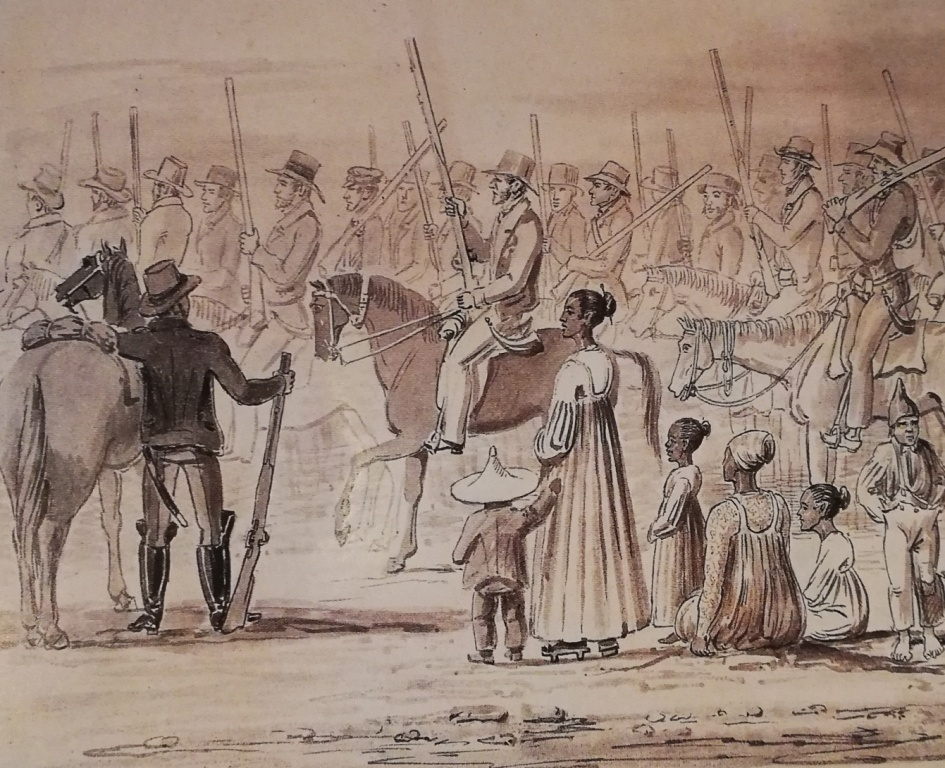
A Cape Mounted Burgher commando assembling for action in Seventh Frontier War.

When the Seventh Frontier War (the "Amatola War") erupted, the conventional imperial troops soon suffered setbacks in the rough frontier terrain. Their long troop columns were slow and easily ambushed by the elusive Xhosa gunmen. Faced with increasing losses and a full-scale invasion of the Xhosa armies across the frontier, the British Governor Sir Peregrine Maitland called upon the local Cape Burgher Commandos. The Cape burghers were mounted frontier gunmen, recruited locally from Boer, Mfengu, settler, Khoikhoi and Griqua populations, and fiercely loyal to Stockenström. They objected to serving under an imperial commander, so Governor Maitland promoted Stockenström to colonel, so as to place him in command of the local mixed commandos.

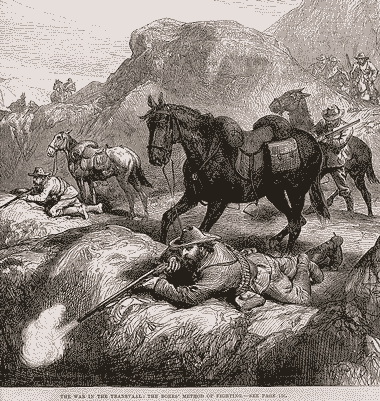
Stockenström's use of mobile mounted local commandos was shown to be highly effective in the mountainous frontier terrain.

Stockenström's burgher force first cleared the south-western part of the Eastern Province up to the Fish River, inflicting a string of defeats on the amaNgqika, and then advanced to Fort Beaufort, where it was initially ordered that he would invade the Xhosa country. Instead of launching a military invasion to destroy the Xhosa armies, Stockenström selected a small group of his mounted commandos, crossed the Colony's border and rapidly rode deep into the Transkei Xhosa heartland, directly towards the kraal of Sarhili ("Kreli"), the paramount chief of all the Xhosa. Due in part to the speed of their approach, they were barely engaged by Xhosa forces and rode directly into Sarhili's capital.

Paramount Chief Sarhili and his generals agreed to meet Stockenström (with his commandants Groepe, Molteno and Brownlee), unarmed, on a nearby mountain ridge. The meeting was initially tense - the fathers of both Sarhili and Stockenström had been killed whilst unarmed. Both men were also veterans of several frontier wars against each other and, while they treated each other with extreme respect, Stockenström nonetheless made the extreme demand that Sarhili assume responsibility for any future Ngqika attacks. After protracted negotiations, Sarhili agreed to return any raided cattle & other property and to relinquish claims to the Ngqika land west of the Kei. He also promised to use his limited authority over the frontier Ngqika to restrain cross-border attacks. A treaty was signed and the commandos departed on good terms.

However, Governor Maitland rejected the treaty and sent an insulting letter back to the Xhosa paramount-chief, demanding greater acts of submission and servility. Furious, Stockenstrom and his local commandos resigned and departed from the war, leaving the imperial troops and the Xhosa - both starving and afflicted by fever - to a long, drawn-out war of attrition.

Andries, his health ruined by this expedition (he remained in poor health the rest of his life), called on the British government to institute an inquiry into the war, maintaining that it had been prolonged needlessly but the new governor, Sir Harry Smith, ostentatiously blamed the Stockenström treaty system for being the cause of the war. In a meeting with the Xhosa chiefs, the Governor famously tore up a piece of paper in front of the chiefs and announced: "No more treaties". Historian Piers Brendon described "Smith, placing his foot on the neck of the Xhosan ruler and proclaiming, 'I am your Paramount Chief, and the Kaffirs are my dogs!'"

Sir Andries publicly condemned Governor Smith's policies, and warned that they would precipitate a further crisis, but Earl Grey, the Secretary for the Colonies, declined to take action.

== Political career ==
=== Campaign for Representative Government ===
Stockenström's response to what he perceived as the incompetence of direct imperial control was to back calls for the Cape Colony to get greater local control over its affairs, through the institution of elected representative government. Stockenström, who had been created a baronet in 1840, used his military pension to support his drive for an elected parliament.

When Governor Smith called an election in 1850 (the only one of its kind) to get around the difficulty of finding suitable people to serve on the legislative council, Sir Andries received the most votes cast for any candidate from the Eastern Province. However, Robert Godlonton led several Legislative Council members in denying that the elections represented popular opinion, and Sir Andries and the other popularly elected members resigned in September.

In 1851 he and John Fairbairn travelled to Britain in the hope of persuading the British government to introduce representative government in the Cape. But as a result of his call for an inquiry into Governor Harry Smith's policies, Sir Andries was in turn made the scapegoat for their failure, and was additionally blamed for the Kat River rebellion during the Eighth Frontier War of 1850. Instead of a commission of inquiry, a select committee was appointed. Duminy writes that it "neither recommended an inquiry nor prepared a report".

During his absence, his opponents destroyed his farm, Maasström, in 1851.

=== Member of Parliament ===
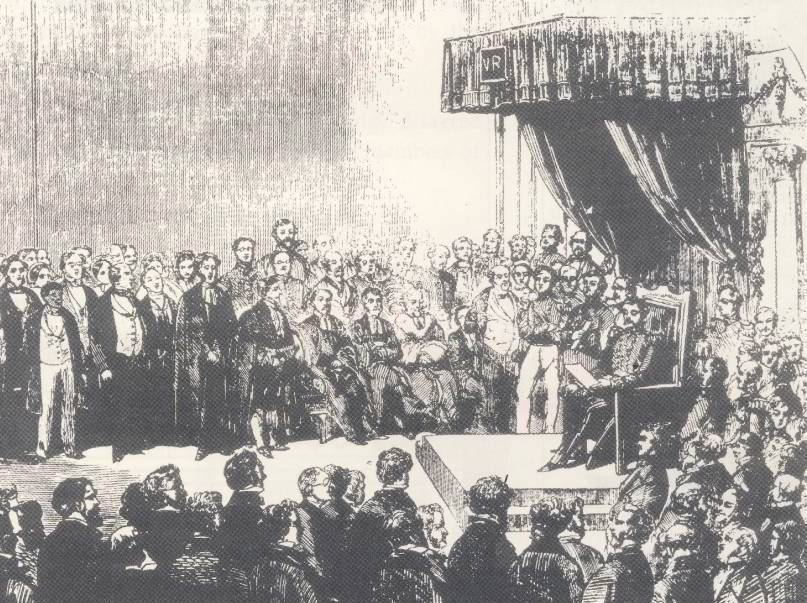
Stockenström was elected to the first Cape Parliament in 1854.

Representative government was nonetheless instituted in 1853, and Sir Andries was approached to run for election to the new Cape Parliament to represent the Eastern Divisions. To meet the expenses of the campaign and of the destruction of his property, he arranged for the subdivision of a part of Maasström (one-third of the 4 985 morgen) as a township, which was named Bedford, after Sir Andries's friend, the 8th Duke of Bedford.

Following a heated electoral campaign, Sir Andries defeated his old enemy, Godlonton – despite renewed publication of all the old accusations against him in Godlonton's newspaper, the Graham's Town Journal.

As a member of the Cape legislative council, Sir Andries piloted the passage of the Divisional Councils Act, which in his view restored a link between the government and the governed, which had been broken in 1828 (with the abolition of landdrosts). He also supported the passing of the Burgher Force Bill, which placed the local Cape commandos on an equal footing with the already-established military garrison.

In one of his final political acts, he gave his support to the infant movement for "Responsible Government" in the Cape, as a way to curtail what he saw as the ineptitude of direct imperial control in Southern Africa.

In other respects, he was frustrated. The Khoikhoi settlement on the Kat River was broken up, and little was done to rein in frontier warmongers and land speculators.

== Retirement and later life ==
Failing health saw him resign his seat in March 1856, and he left the colony the following month. He lived for a while in Nice, Naples and England, returned to the Cape in 1860, and again went to London in 1862, where he would die in 1864 aged 71 of bronchitis that had plagued him for years. He was interred in Kensal Green Cemetery, London.

== Family ==
Anders Andersen Stockenström (*1707 †1764), inspector of mines and mayor of Filipstad x Caterina Margarita Ekman (*1723).

1. Anders Stockenström *6 January 1757 Filipstad in Värmland, Sweden x 1 June 1786 Maria Geertruyda Broeders (baptised 11 March 1764), daughter of Peter Caspar Brodersen (or Broders), from Rantrum, a North Frisian town in Schleswig, and Elsabe Cornelia Colijn. The couple had four sons and four daughters.
  1. Sir Andries Stockenström, 1st baronet x 8 December 1828 Elsabe Helena Maasdorp (1808-1889), daughter of Gijsbert Henry Maasdorp. The couple had six children, of whom the firstborn died as a baby.
    1. Sir Gijsbert Henry Stockenström (1841-1912), 2nd baronet - no issue
    2. Elizabeth Maria Henrietta Stockenström x 1852 farmer and politician Charles William Hutton (13 July 1826 – 1 February 1905), who in 1887 edited Sir Andries's autobiography in two volumes, and was Cape Colony treasurer from 1881 to 1884.
      1. Ella Elizabeth Hutton *1 February 1853 x Christian Maasdorp - 6 children
      2. Andries Stockenström Hutton x Blanche Giddy
      3. Charles Henry Hutton d.1897 x Elizabeth Leonard - 3 children
      4. Edward Drummond Hutton d.1941 x Sara Maria Nel - 2 children
    3. Maria Susanna Stockenström d.1870 x 1864 Sir Sidney Godolphin Alexander Shippard (1838/40-1902), lawyer and administrator
    4. Justice Andries Stockenström (22 April 1844 – 22 March 1880) x 24 December 1867 Maria Henrietta Hartzenberg, of Graaff-Reinet
      1. Sir Andries Stockenström, 3rd baronet (1868-1922)(only son), advocate of the Transvaal Supreme Court and a member of the Transvaal and Union parliaments.
        1. Sir Anders Johan Booysen Stockenström, 4th baronet (1908-1957)
          1. Andrée Mabel Stockenström (only child, owner of Maasström) x James Norman Pringle Gardiner

=== Anders Stockenström ===
In September 1781 Anders Stockenström sailed from Texel as a quarter-gunner aboard a VOC ship, 't Zeepaard. Scurvy broke out in the fleet when it reached the Equator, and when it reached Table Bay in December 1782, 1,202 of the 2,753 passengers and crew had died, and 915 were ill. Four of the most heavily armed ships, including 't Zeepaard, sailed for Batavia, after four weeks, to assist in defence of the city against an expected British attack. It is not known whether Anders sailed with the fleet, but two years later he was working as an assistant in the goods office in Cape Town, where he remained for some years. He also served on a vessel carrying slaves for the VOC from Madagascar to the Cape, and was afterwards, until 1795 with the British occupation of the Cape, bookkeeper to the fleet. In March 1796 General J H Craig appointed Anders secretary to Landdrost A A Faure, of Swellendam.

Following the takeover of the Cape by the Batavian Republic, Anders was appointed landdrost of Graaff-Reinet by both Governor Jan Willem Janssens and Commissioner-General Jacob Abraham Uitenhage de Mist. The latter swore him in on 14 February 1804, at which time Graaff-Reinet had been without a permanent landdrost since 1801.

During his eight years as landdrost – under Batavian rule until 1806, and then under British rule – the district experienced Bushman raids in the north and north-west, and an unsettled frontier with the amaXhosa. Public buildings were in need of restoration following the Khoikhoi/Xhosa invasion of 1802-03 (the Third Frontier War). While commandos were sent against the Bushmen, Anders also tried to reconcile the Bushmen by having game shot for them, and periodically giving them cattle.

When steps were eventually taken against the Xhosa in December 1811, Anders, in command of the burghers of Graaff-Reinet, occupied Bruintjieshoogte to protect the area north of the Zuurberg. The commandos of George, Uitenhage and Swellendam, together with the Cape Regiment, gathered at the Sundays River mouth and after Christmas, crossed the river to drive the Xhosa from the Addo bush.

On 27 December Col John Graham of Fintry sent orders to Stockenström to join the rest of the force at Coerney, where Col J G Cuyler (landdrost of Uitenhage) was in charge. Realising that this would leave the area north of the Zuurberg vulnerable to Xhosa attack, Anders went to discuss the matter with Graham.

He set out at sunset on 29 December 1811 with 24 men. About five hours later he encountered a number of Xhosa of the Imidange clan under Kasa on Doringnek, the watershed between the White and Coerney rivers, on the Zuurberg.

Relying on his popularity as the friend and benefactor of both colonists and indigenous peoples, Anders dismounted and went to meet the war party unarmed. He spent at least half an hour endeavouring to persuade Kasa to return to their country without bloodshed but when he returned to mount his horse, the Imidange had surrounded his party and attacked, killing eight burghers and an interpreter. Four were wounded but managed to escape.

=== Sir Gijsbert Henry Stockenström ===
Sir Andries's eldest surviving son (*1841 †1912) succeeded him as baronet and was a member of the Cape Legislative Council from 1891 to 1910. Sir Gijsbert died without issue, and the title passed to the offspring of his younger brother, also named Andries.

=== Justice Andries Stockenström ===
Justice Andries Stockenström (22 April 1844 Graaff-Reinet - 22 March 1880 Swellendam), second son of Sir Andries Stockenström (1st Baronet), was an influential judge and the Attorney-General of the Cape Colony.

His child, Andries (1868-1922), became the third and penultimate Stockenström baronet in 1912.

== Notes and references ==
Baronetage of the United Kingdom
New creation	Baronet (of Maas Ström); 1840–1864	Succeeded by Gysbert Stockenström
