= Johan Conrad Silberbauer =

Johan Conrad Silberbauer (14 March 1826 - 28 April 1897) was a Member of Parliament and businessman of the Cape Colony.

== Family and travels ==
Silberbauer was born on 14 March 1826 in Port Elizabeth, the son of an immigrant from Bleckede, Germany.

As a profession, he was an auditor of the Union Mining Company and a director of the Cape Commercial Bank. Silberbauer was recorded as having been exceptionally widely traveled, having traveled through countries across Europe, Asia and the Americas (Cape Argus 1897). He married Adamina de Smidt and had several children.

== Political career ==
He was recorded as one of Cape Town's Wardmasters in the 1850s.

He entered the Cape Parliament's House of Assembly in 1859, and stood until 1868, representing the constituency of Caledon. He was a fervent supporter of John Molteno's movement for "Responsible Government", but retired from parliament before it was successfully attained in 1872.
