= John Paterson (Cape politician) =

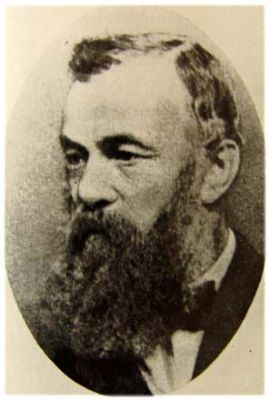
John Paterson, businessman and influential politician.

John Paterson (1822 – 1880) was a politician and businessman of the Cape Colony, and had a great influence on the development of Port Elizabeth where he was based. He ran newspapers, established the Grey Institute and played a significant role in founding South Africa's Standard Bank.

== Early life and business ventures ==
Born and raised in Aberdeen, Scotland, Paterson studied at Marischal university college and emigrated to Port Elizabeth in 1841 to take up a position as a school master. Later he successfully persuaded Sir George Grey, then the Governor of the Cape Colony, to take an interest in his proposals for new boys schools and Grey made land and funding available to Paterson for their founding.

On 7 May 1845, he secretly started his first business, the Eastern Province Herald newspaper, with his partner John R. Philip, son of Scottish missionary John Philip, as the official owner. As he was still contracted by the state this was an illegal activity so his involvement remained clandestine. After a disagreement, Paterson stopped publication in 1850 and started a new newspaper, the Eastern Province News which he soon renamed to the original name in 1854. He later sold the newspaper in 1857 to his friend Robert Godlonton who owned the Grahamstown Journal, though he continued to use the paper as a platform for his opinions. Philip meanwhile had opened the competing Port Elizabeth Mercury newspaper.

Paterson was however already a successful businessman. He had made a series of property investments on the outskirts of the expanding town of Port Elizabeth, and a range of other business enterprises. He also briefly served as the Consular Agent for the United States in Port Elizabeth, and gained much American business for his trading firm though this. He had a lifelong interest in boys schools, and founded several in his life, including Grey High School, an accomplished school for boys in Port Elizabeth that he founded in 1856.

== Political career ==
Paterson's success on both the Board of Town Commissioners and later Municipality, resulted in his accepting nomination and being elected to the House of Assembly. His early activity involved lobbying for increased European immigration, and the widespread anti-convict agitation of 1849.

=== First Parliamentary term and Eastern Cape separatism (1854–1858) ===
In 1854 he was elected to the first Cape Parliament as one of the two members for Port Elizabeth (together with Henry Fancourt White). From the beginning of his political career he made the secession of the eastern part of the Cape Colony a priority. He felt very strongly that the Xhosa people of the eastern Cape frontier were a severe threat to the colonists' safety and that this threat was not helped by the Cape government's relaxed attitude to the frontier.

His proposed solution was a view which he held for the remainder of his life – that the eastern Cape deserved a greater degree of separation, or to become the seat of the Cape's parliament and government. In this, he differed from the radical members of the "separatist league", who were based further east in Grahamstown, were led by Robert Godlonton, and who proposed absolute and immediate separation. He also angered Godlonton's Grahamstown clique by his blocking of their Kowie harbour proposal, which he saw as potentially taking shipping activity away from Port Elizabeth. The separatist movement began a gradual decline due to a growing fear in the Midlands around Port Elizabeth and Graaff-Reinett that if they attained separation then they would fall under the domination of Grahamstown.

He resigned from politics in 1858 due to his wife's fatal illness.

=== Business interlude (1859–1873) ===
In 1859 he made a business trip to Britain having moved his five children there after the death of his wife. He also had business connections and gave consideration to a bid for a seat in the British parliament, which he decided against. It was during this time that he paid a visit to the U.S.A. and also travelled to the Continent.

In 1862 he founded Standard Bank of South Africa now the largest bank in Africa. Soon after the South African Irrigation and Investment Company and the Eastern Province Railway Company followed. One of his favourite maxims was: "It is no good having grand ideas without the gold to back them". However, the death of a business partner while out of the country coupled to a declining economy resulted in several business failures and declared bankruptcy in 1867.

Between 1861 and 1862 John Paterson met Marizza Bowie who became his second wife. Marizza's mother, a Thurburn of Myrtle, Aberdeen was a direct descendant of David I King of Scotland. Between 1863 - 1880 Marizza presented her husband with eight children.

In 1872, the Cape attained self-rule (or "responsible government" as it was known) and an economic boom ensued as the new locally elected government began vast infrastructure projects across the country. Paterson, financially uplifted by the economic boom, re-entered politics.

=== Return to Parliament (1872–1877) ===
==== Separatist League (1872–1874) ====
Paterson was elected to the Cape Parliament again in 1873. The enormous growth in the economy was fueling a competition between the ports Cape Town and Port Elizabeth, for the expanding inland trade. Paterson therefore returned to his fight for a moderate form of separation – so as to avoid dominance by either Cape Town to the west, or Grahamstown to the east. In other developments, he put forward bills for a local government system, and for a division of public money according to customs and land revenue, but both bills were defeated.

Paterson and his political ally John Gordon Sprigg comprised the core of the opposition to the first Cape government, together with the renegade independent John X. Merriman (who soon joined the government). Paterson's strongest critic was the liberal Saul Solomon, who ridiculed Paterson's ideas.

Paterson's role in the "Eastern Cape Separatist League" also brought him into a direct showdown with the strong-willed Prime Minister of the Cape, John Molteno – a firm proponent of regional and racial unity in the Cape – who reacted in May 1874 by passing the Seven Circles Act. This re-drew the borders of the Cape's subdivisions, abolishing the last legal remnants of the East/West distinction. Together with Molteno's policy of drawing ministers from the Eastern Cape into his government, and the general rising prosperity of the whole country, this effectively crushed the separatist movement. Paterson fought the Bill bitterly, but nonetheless kept his seat in parliament as a member of the opposition once it was passed. He went on to become the primary critic of the Molteno Ministry over the following years, even when the official head of the opposition John X. Merriman joined Molteno's unity government.

Not always popular, Paterson's views, and especially the way in which he delivered them, often provoked considerable hostility in parliament. This all too frequently left him isolated and unable to do more than temporarily obstruct government projects.

==== Enforcement of Confederation (1874–1877) ====
Starting in 1874, the British Secretary of State for the Colonies, Lord Carnarvon, having recently federated Canada, began a project to impose the very same system of confederation on the very different states of southern Africa. This was to consolidate European control of southern Africa and bring about a united policy towards the Black African inhabitants. Lord Carnarvon also expressed an interest in making Paterson the next Cape Prime Minister, in order to bring this about.

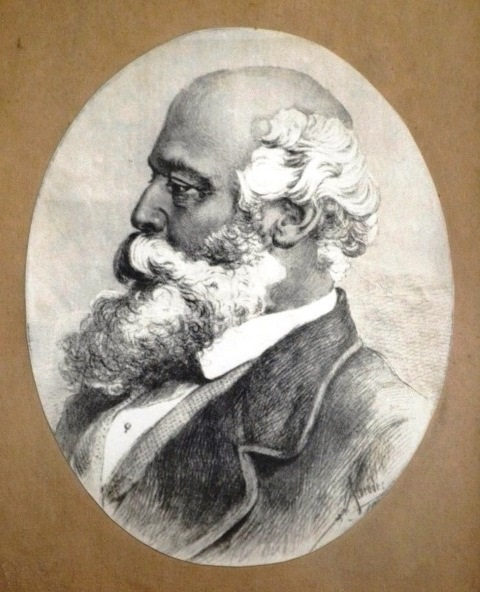
John Molteno, Cape Prime Minister and Paterson's lifelong political opponent.

There was little local enthusiasm for the project, and its timing was particularly unfortunate – coming when the various southern African states were still simmering after the last bout of British imperial expansion. However Carnarvon was determined, and appointed Henry Bartle Frere – an autocratic imperialist with little experience of southern African politics – as governor, with instructions to implement Carnarvon's confederation. Molteno turned the confederation idea down flat, saying it was impractical and badly timed, but Paterson saw an opportunity to ensure that his eastern province gained autonomy (albeit within the proposed confederation), and that he himself could win the position of leading it.

In a series of letters between him and Carnarvon (The Confederation Despatch, 1876), Paterson discreetly offered the Colonial Office his support against the Molteno government in exchange for vague promises of a future leadership position. Paterson also made a public call for an invasion and annexation of the Transvaal Republic, for the future confederation. When Molteno, by now furious with Paterson for what he saw as a betrayal of the Cape's independence and democracy, made it clear that he was willing to resign but not to endorse confederation, Frere used the authority of the Colonial Office to suspend the elected Cape government and assumed direct control in 1878 (appointing Gordon Sprigg as his puppet Prime Minister, instead of Paterson who was at the time considered too divisive a politician for the job). Paterson, disappointed, then travelled to London as a representative of the potential new Eastern Province, while Frere launched his invasion of Zululand in 1879 before being recalled to London to face charges of misconduct.

The confederation scheme was dropped, having by now spawned a trail of wars across southern Africa – including new frontier wars against the Xhosa and the Pedi people, the Anglo-Zulu war, the Basuto Gun War and later the First Boer War.

== Death ==
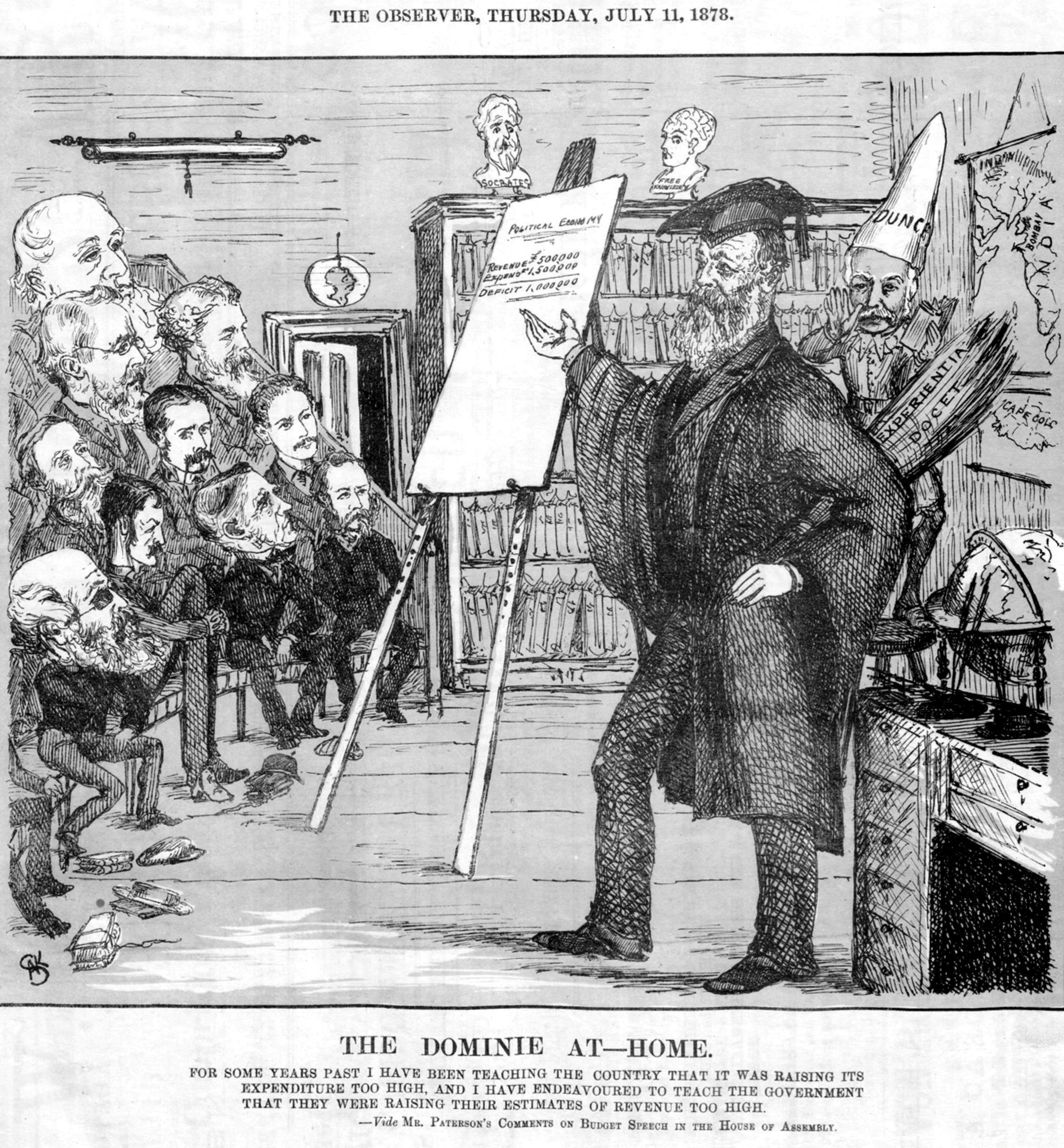
Paterson's "pedagogic" approach is alluded to in this 1878 cartoon by the Port Elizabeth Observer (a newspaper that supported him). Paterson is shown lecturing the MPs of parliament on budgeting and finance.

Paterson died suspiciously on his way back to the Cape in May 1880 in a bizarre double-shipwreck. He initially twice delayed his departure, missing ships, before he boarded the ship the Union R.M.S. American. The American was then dramatically wrecked off West Africa, when its propeller-shaft snapped, bent and tore open part of the ship's plating. The passengers evacuated the ship in an ordered way before it sank but, adrift in the Atlantic Ocean, the lifeboats became separated. The passengers were all later found and rescued. However, Paterson's lifeboat was separately picked up by the Senegal which then ran aground on the coast of Grand Canary Island. In the chaos following this second shipwreck, Paterson was reported to have been struck by a hard object (reportedly the ship's propeller) and killed. He was the only casualty from the two shipwrecks.

Upon news of Paterson's death, flags across the Cape were flown at half mast. His obituary in the Cape Argus, while acknowledging the political controversy and hostility he sometimes caused, paid tribute to his zeal for what he believed to be right, and to his enormous achievements. The village of Paterson in the Eastern Cape, South Africa was named after him.

Writer Stanley Little commented on Paterson's death and political style in his 1887 work on the Cape's political leaders.

He never attained to the position to which his ambition led him to aspire, but lost his life, in a sad manner, on his voyage out to the Cape. The American, in which vessel he took his passage, sustained shipwreck, but he escaped in the Senegal, which ship grounded a few days afterwards, and Mr Paterson went to the bottom. He represented Port Elizabeth in the Assembly, and was for some time the leader of the Opposition. He was an able man, but some severe things were said about him, which on the wholesome principle de mortuis nil nisi bonum, I shall not repeat. He was a firm Confederationist, and took the Eastern view of matters in the East versus West controversy. He could speak well, and would have been worth listening to, had it not been for a certain ugly mannerism. His delivery too, was dry and cold, and very trying, and he had moreover, been unsuccessful in his efforts to cure himself of the sing-song tin-kettle brogue of the bourgeoisie Scotchman. Mr Paterson had been a schoolmaster, and in good sooth, he retained a pedagogic style to the last.

— James Stanley Little, South Africa: A Sketchbook of Men, Manners and Facts (1887) Swan, Sonnenschein, Lowrey & Co. London. pp.333-334

== See also ==
- Eastern Cape Separatist League
- History of Cape Colony from 1870 to 1899
- Grey High School

Political offices
| New title | Representative of Port Elizabeth; 1854–1857 | Succeeded by ??? |
| Preceded by ??? | Representative of Port Elizabeth; 1873–1879 | Succeeded by ??? |
