= Griqualand West Annexation Act =

1877 unification of the British Cape Colony and Griqualand West

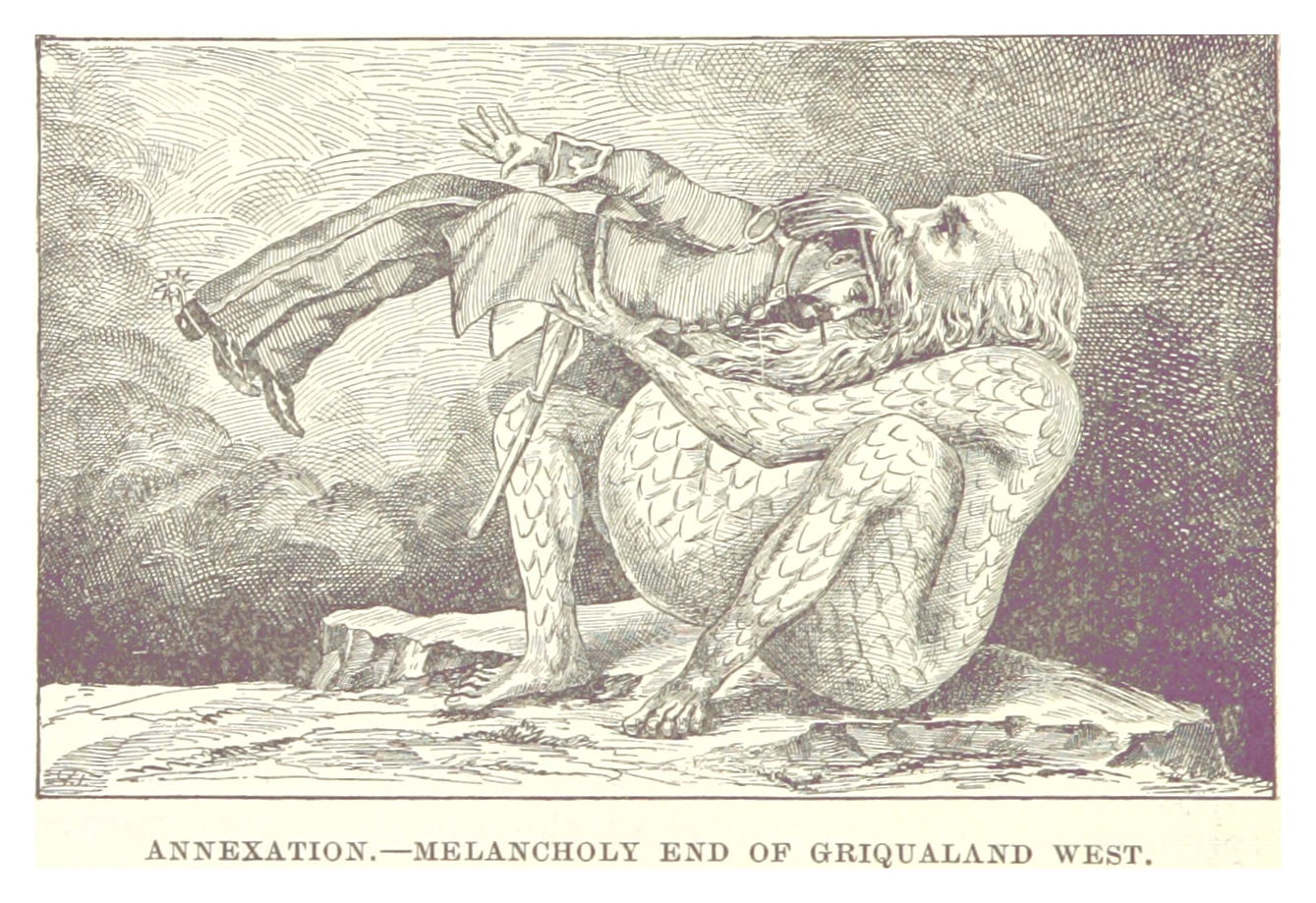
Caricature from "Incwadi Yami", showing Major William Owen Lanyon, the British imperial administrator of Griqualand West, being eaten by the Cape Colony.

In the colonial history of South Africa, the Griqualand West Annexation Act (Act 39 of 1877), was the act, passed in the Cape Colony Parliament on 27 July 1877, authorising the union of the Cape Colony with Griqualand West.

== Background ==
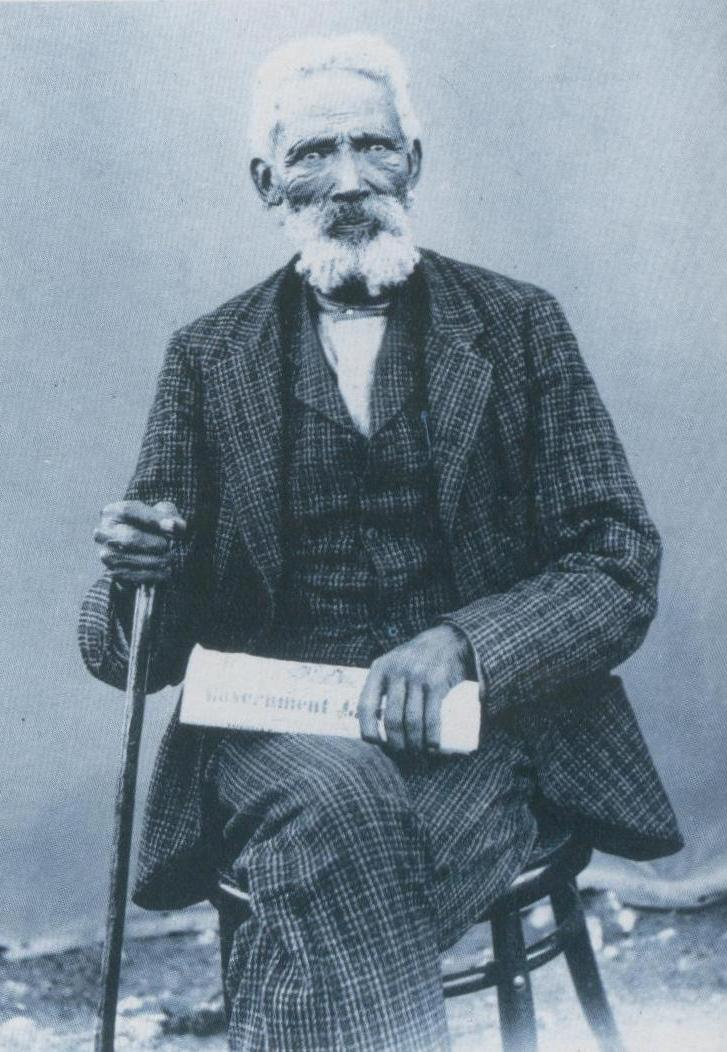
Nicolaas Waterboer, Griqua Kaptejn and leader.

Griqualand West, one of the states created by the semi-nomadic Griqua people, was brought under British rule, as a separate colony, on 27 October 1871. It contained the newly discovered diamond fields of Kimberley and was beginning to attract large numbers of prospectors. With possession of this land being claimed by the Orange Free State, and contested by the arriving diamond diggers, the Griqua leader Nicolaas Waterboer requested that the Cape Colony incorporate Griqualand West, as this would give his people representation in the Cape Parliament and a certain degree of political empowerment.

The Cape Colony, under Responsible Government from 1872, explicitly adhered to a policy of incorporating "natives" into the Cape's political and economic system. This was quite unlike the policy in the Orange Free State which was vying for control of the diamond fields and the other southern African states which generally segregated their populations and excluded non-white peoples from political participation. This factor no doubt influenced Waterboer's decision, however the Cape government initially decided against incorporating the territory, due primarily to objections from both the European settlers and from certain portions of the indigenous population.

Upon the Cape's initial refusal to incorporate it in 1873, Griqualand West became a separate British Crown Colony, with Sir Richard Southey as its Administrator and Lieutenant Governor. There followed bitter land disputes between the white diggers, the Griqua people and the Orange Free State. A land court was set up, under Judge Andries Stockenstrom, but this did little to resolve the disagreements. In 1875 Southey was replaced as Lieutenant Governor by Major William Owen Lanyon, who publicly professed a great dislike for the Griqua people and for Griqualand West overall, which he dubbed a "hideous and disgusting place". He oversaw a systematic dispossession of the Griqua people.

The Cape finally agreed to incorporate the territory four years later in 1877, following agreement by the British government on compensation to the Orange Free State for its competing land claims. The Cape Prime Minister John Molteno still had serious doubts about annexing the heavily indebted region, but, after striking a deal with the Home Government and receiving reassurances that the local population would be consulted in the process, he passed the Griqualand West Annexation Act on 27 July 1877.

== Provisions ==
Map showing the Cape Colony, with the Griqua and Boer states in green and pink respectively.

The act specified that Griqualand West would have the right to elect four representatives to the Legislative Assembly of the Cape parliament, two for Kimberley and two for the Barkly West region. It would also elect one representative to the Legislative Council, the smaller upper house. In the judiciary, the local Griqua attorney-general reported to the Cape Supreme Court, which got concurrent jurisdiction with the Griqualand West Supreme Court in the territory.

The act was not without controversy however. The seats were allocated according to population, but Kimberley representatives argued that the number should be increased to represent the relative wealth of the area. The Cape Government also enforced its non-racial Cape Qualified Franchise system. This meant that all resident males could qualify for the vote, with the qualifications for suffrage applied equally regardless of race. This was welcomed by the Griqua and Tswana majority, but rejected by the diggers, who comprised much of the white minority.

The promulgation of the act was set for 18 October 1880, when the last Lieutenant Governor, James Rose Innes stepped down and direct British imperial rule over the territory ended.

Many spent (obsolete) sections of the act were repealed on 19 May 1934 by the Cape Statute Law Revision Act, 1934. Another section was repealed on 14 June 1967 by the Pre-Union Statute Law Revision Act, 1967, and the remainder of the act was repealed on 2 September 1970 by the Pre-Union Statute Law Revision Act, 1970.
