= Southey =

Southey may refer to:

== Places ==
- Sotby, Lincolnshire, England, called "Southey" in the Domesday Book of William the Conqueror
- Southey, South Yorkshire, England
- Southey, Saskatchewan

== Surname ==
- Caroline Anne Southey (1786–1854), English poet; second wife of Robert Southey
- Richard Southey (colonial administrator) (1808–1901), South African colonial administrator and cabinet minister; father of Col. Richard Southey
- Richard Southey (British Army officer) (1844–1909), South African colonial military commander; son of Sir Richard Southey
- Reginald Southey (1835–1899), English physician; nephew of Robert Southey
- Robert Southey (1774–1843), English romantic poet
- Walter Southey (1897–1920), British flying ace

== See also ==
- Southie (disambiguation)
- South (disambiguation)
