= Richard Southey =

Richard Southey may refer to:

- Richard Southey (colonial administrator) (1808–1901), British-born South African colonial administrator and landowner
- Richard Southey (British Army officer) (1844–1909), his son, South African officer in the British Army and Cape Colonial Forces
