= Ebenezer John Buchanan =

South African judge

The Honourable Sir Ebenezer John Buchanan
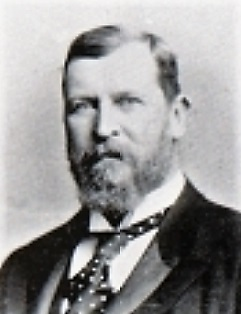

Judge of the Cape Provincial Division of the Supreme Court
- In office 1910–1920

Judge of the Cape Supreme Court
- In office 1892–1910

Judge of the Supreme Court of the Eastern Districts
- In office 1881–1892

Personal details
- Born: 8 March 1844 Tahiti, Pacific islands
- Died: 11 October 1930 (aged 86) Cape Town, Union of South Africa

Sir Ebenezer John Buchanan (8 March 1844 – 11 October 1930) was a journalist, politician and judge of the Colony of the Cape of Good Hope. He was knighted in 1901.

== Early life ==
Buchanan was the second son of the missionary Ebenezer Buchanan and his wife Jane Cowan. He received his schooling in Pietermaritzburg, after which he began his journalistic career with The Natal Witness. He also worked at The Times of Natal and The Natal Mercury, where he was the parliamentary reporter. In 1866, Buchanan moved to the Cape Colony and joined the staff of The Cape Argus.

== Judicial career ==
In the late 1860s, Buchanan went to London to read law. He entered the Inner Temple in 1869 and was called to the bar of the Inner Temple in 1873. Buchanan returned to Cape Town and was admitted as an advocate. He also entered politics, and in 1877 he became the member for the Worcester in the Cape Legislative Assembly.

In 1880, Buchanan was appointed an acting judge of the Eastern Districts Court and in 1881, he became a permanent judge. In 1892, he was appointed the first puisne judge of the Cape Supreme Court. On several occasions, when Lord de Villiers was not available, he acted as chief justice and in this capacity, he presided over the Cape Legislative Council in the parliamentary sessions of 1894, 1897, 1900, and 1905. After the Union of South Africa, he remained a judge of the Cape Provincial Division of the Supreme Court and also regularly acted as Judge President.

In the field of education, Buchanan was a member of the council of the University of the Cape of Good Hope from 1888 until 1918 and its vice-chancellor from 1901 to 1905.

== Honours ==
Buchanan was awarded the honorary degree of LLD by the University of Cambridge and by the University of South Africa.
