= R v Albert =

1895 South African legal case

Queen v Albert is an important case in South African criminal law, especially as it applies to the defence of superior orders. It was heard in the Supreme Court of the Cape of Good Hope on August 5, 1895. The case had been sent up for review by the Resident Magistrate of Somerset West, under Act 20 of 1856. It came before De Villiers CJ, as judge of the week.

De Villiers CJ held, and Upington J concurred that, a child under fourteen years of age who assists his father in committing a crime is presumed to do so in obedience to his father's orders, and is not punishable, even if he knew that he was doing a forbidden act—unless, in the case of a child above seven years of age, the crime was so heinous as obviously to absolve him from the duty of obedience.

== See also ==
- Defense of infancy
- South African criminal law
- Superior orders
