= Attorney General Jacobs =

Attorney General Jacobs may refer to:

- Simeon Jacobs (1839–1883), Attorney General of British Kaffraria
- Wilfred Jacobs (1919–1995), Attorney-General of Antigua and Barbuda
