= Black Flag Revolt =

19th century conflict in South Africa

The Black Flag Revolt in 1875 was a conflict between the white diggers and the British colonial government of Griqualand West in South Africa.

== Revolt ==
The British official administering the Griqualand West Colony was Sir Richard Southey, who wished to curb the diggers' independence. The revolt was led by Alfred Aylward. Other major players in the revolt were William Ling, Henry Tucker and Conrad von Schlickmann. The diggers were upset about high taxes, increased rent and coloured unrest. Aylward was pushing for a Republican form of government and preached revolution. He formed the Defense League and Protection Association and pledged action against taxation. Aylward inspired the diggers to take up arms in March and formed the paramilitary Diggers’ Protection Association. A black flag was the signal for Aylward's supporters to revolt.

William Cowie, a hotel owner, was arrested without bail for selling guns to Aylward without a permit. Aylward mounted the "black flag", the signal to revolt, in response to Cowies’ arrest. The rebels blocked the prison upon the arrival of Cowie. Cowie was eventually acquitted. Southey asked for British troops to be sent to help control the situation. Volunteers from the Cape assembled to assist. The rebels held control of the streets for ten weeks.

They surrendered upon the arrival of British troops on 30 June 1875. The rebel leaders were arrested and put on trial but were found not guilty by a jury. London was not happy with the way that Southey had handled the situation and the costs of sending troops, and he was removed from his position. The significance of the "Black Flag Revolt" was a victory for white interests, the end to independent diggers and signalled the rise of diamond magnates.

== Sources ==
- Meredith, Martin (23 September 2008). Diamonds, Gold, and War: The British, the Boers, and the Making of South Africa. PublicAffairs. ISBN 978-1-58648-677-8.
