= Andries Stockenström (judge) =

South African lawyer in the Cape Colony

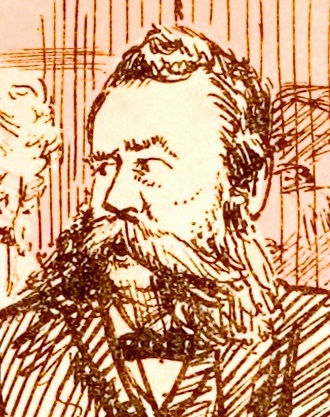
- Judge Andries Stockenström. Humorous 1878 sketch, from the Lantern newspaper

Attorney-General of the Cape Colony
- In office 1879–1880

Attorney-General of the Cape Colony
- In office 1877–1878

Justice Andries Stockenström (22 April 1844 Graaff-Reinet - 22 March 1880 Swellendam), second son of Sir Andries Stockenström (1st Baronet), was an influential judge in the Cape Colony. He was appointed Attorney-General of the Cape in 1877, but died soon after his appointment at the age of 36.

== Early life ==
The younger Andries Stockenström was born in Graaff-Reinet on 22-04-1844, the second son of the Sir Andries Stockenström, 1st Baronet and his wife Elsabe Maasdorp.

He received an education in law in England and Germany, was called to the English Bar at the Middle Temple in 1865, and in 1866 was admitted as an advocate in Cape Town. He soon moved to Grahamstown, where he built up a large and successful practice.

When his father died, his older brother Sir Gijsbert Henry Stockenström inherited the family's Baronetcy.

== Legal career and work with Griqualand West ==
Map of the Cape Colony and Griqualand West

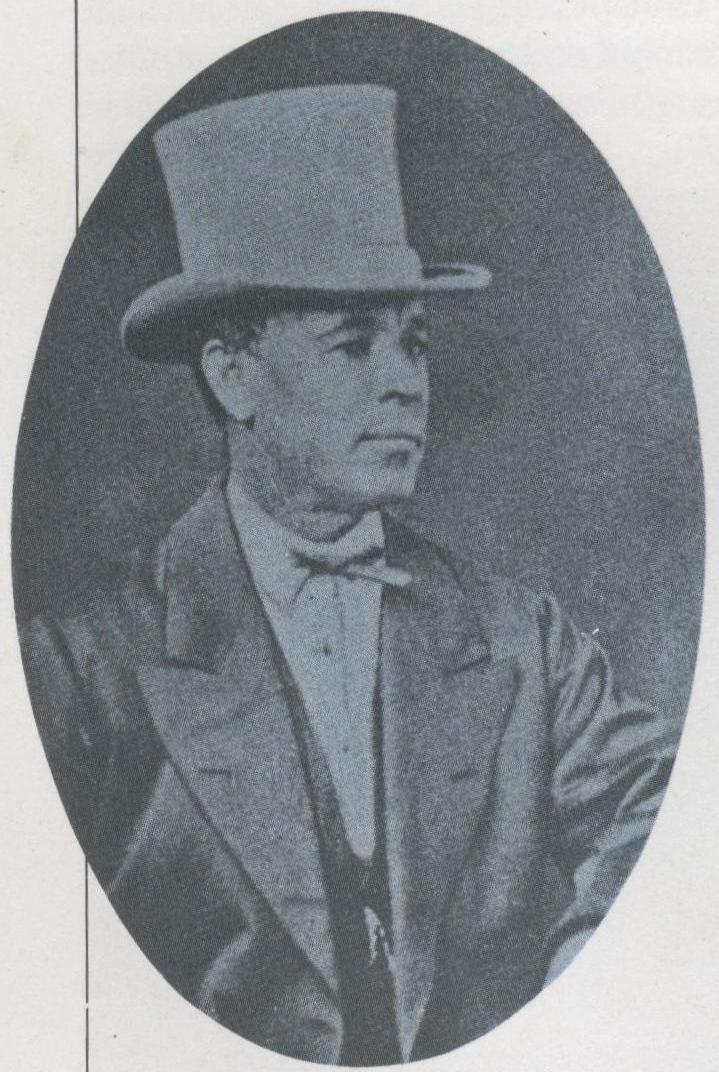
David Arnot, Griqua lawyer and diplomat

In 1875, he was named to act as a judge in the Griqualand West Land Court by High Commissioner Sir Henry Barkly. Griqualand West had recently been annexed by Britain and the Land Court was established to rule on questions of land title within the territory. This was controversial work, as the principal diamond fields lay within Griqualand West, and the rulings of the court would naturally influence the access that neighbouring states would have to this resource.

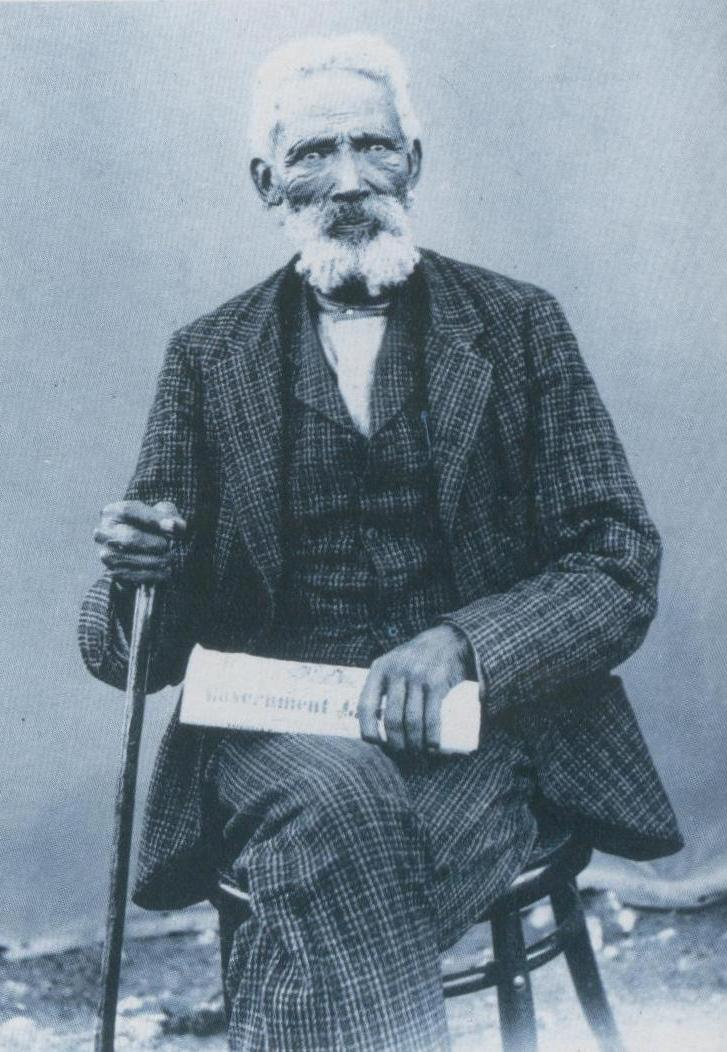
Griqua leader and Captain, Nicolaas Waterboer

In a crucial finding Stockenström ruled that, as the Griqua people were nomadic, the Griqua chiefs (or "captains") were rulers over a people, but not over a fixed territory. The Griqua people had also only arrived in this part of Southern Africa a little over 50 years before, in the early 19th century. The Griqua captains therefore did not automatically get the right to own and develop all of the land through which they moved, but only those areas in which they would settle. Other areas they could continue to move through, but were not given automatic title to own and develop.

This resulted in the denial of many of the titles issued by Cornelis Kok and other Griqua leaders. The land claims of the powerful Griqua Captain Nicolaas Waterboer, outside of his core areas around Griquatown and Albania, were also denied.

This decision also validated many of the official claims of the Orange Free State to the dry diamond diggings, but President Brand waived his country's rights in return for a payment of £90,000. These rulings were hugely controversial at the time and caused the over-worked Stockenström immense distress.

A common accusation, that Stockenström strongly denied, was that he was prejudiced against the Griqua agent David Arnot, and sympathetic towards Orange Free State President Johannes Brand.

The size of the furore that arose in the wake of the Land Court findings led Andries to plea for a full Royal Commission of Inquiry into his rulings, and Barkly's successor as Governor, Sir Henry Bartle Frere supported this request.

It was however declined on the grounds that the Crown had faith in his judgements.

Winifred Maxwell wrote in the DSAB (with reference to Andries): "To his chagrin Britain refused on grounds of ‘Mr. Stockenström's high reputation for the conscientious discharge of his official duties’. There was absolute confidence in his integrity."

== Political career and death ==
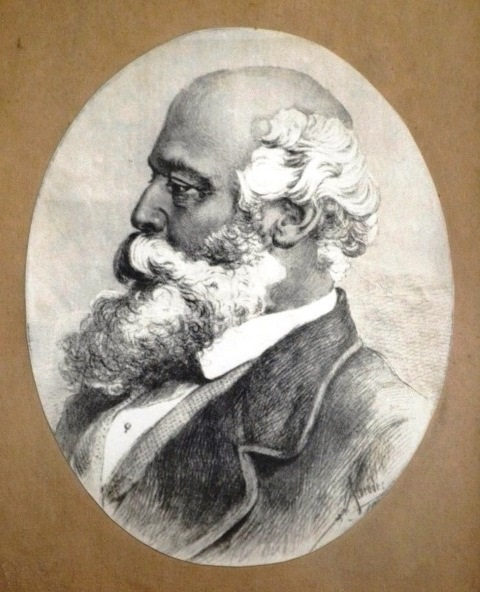
Cape Prime Minister Sir John Molteno

Like his father Andries had a keen interest in politics, and in the final few years before his premature death he became increasingly involved in government.

He initially contested the Grahamstown parliamentary seat in 1876, but lost it to Richard Southey.

He was appointed Attorney-General for the government of Prime Minister John Molteno in 1877, to replace Simeon Jacobs who had retired due to ill health. However he tendered his resignation in 1878, in support of Molteno's fight against British interference in the Cape's government.

Later in 1878, he succeeded in being elected MP for Albert (Burgersdorp), and was reappointed judge in 1879.

Although unwell, he undertook a circuit in 1880, but died that year at the age of 36.

Stockenström had married Maria Hartzenberg of Graaff-Reinet in 1867, and the couple had a single child, Andries (1868-1922), who became the third Stockenström baronet in 1912.

Political offices
Preceded by Simeon Jacobs	Attorney General of the Cape Colony; 1877–1878	Succeeded by Thomas Upington
Preceded by ???	Representative of Albert (Burgersdorp); 1878–1880	Succeeded by ???
