= 1894 Cape Colony parliamentary election =

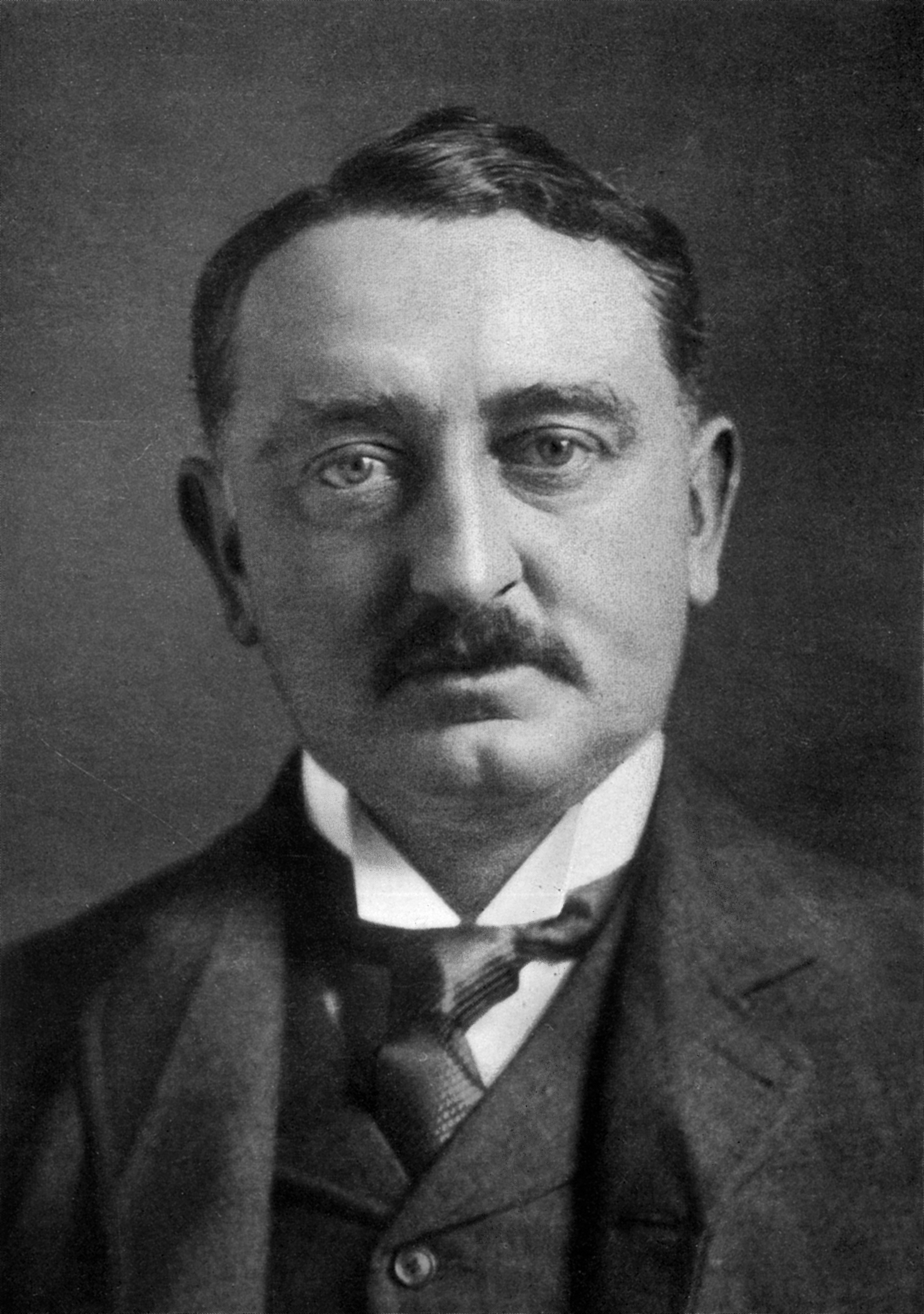
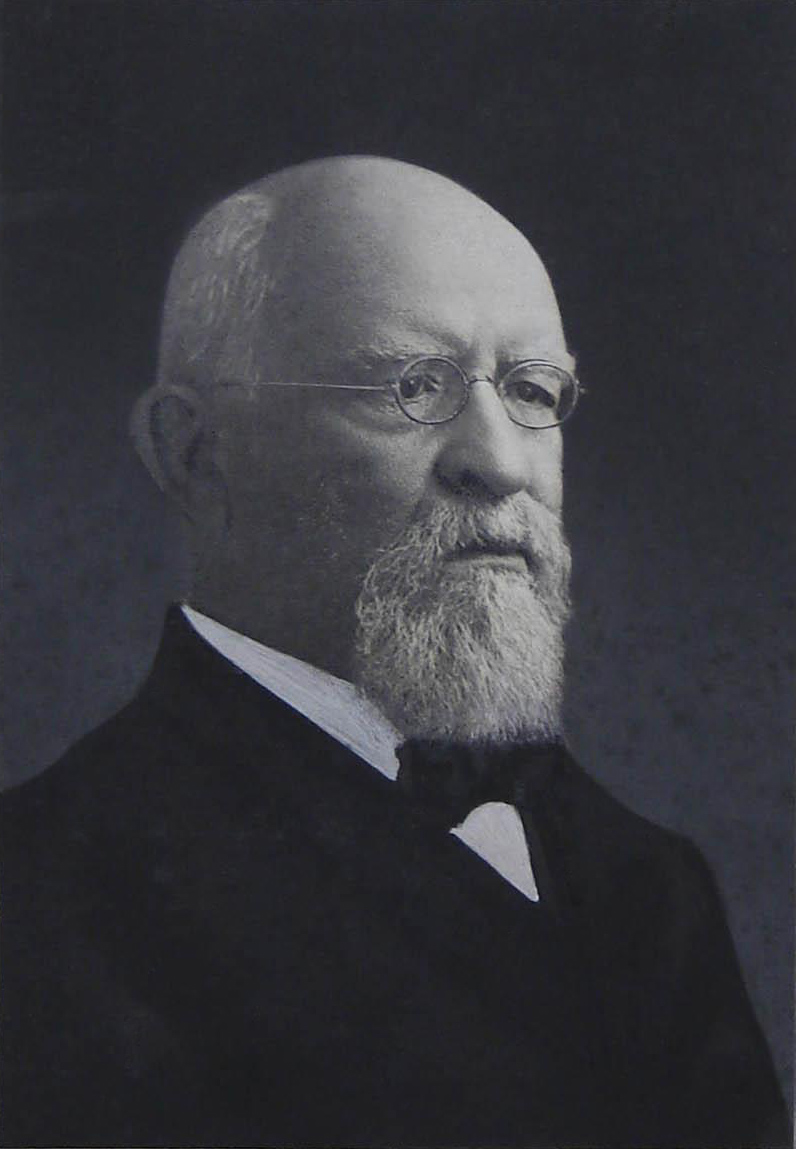
Cecil Rhodes (left), Prime Minister of the Cape since 1890, was again returned with the support of Jan Hendrik Hofmeyr (right), leader of the Afrikaner Bond.

Elections to the Parliament of the Legislative Assembly for the Colony of the Cape of Good Hope were held in early 1894, and saw the victory of the incumbent Rhodes-Afrikaner Bond alliance. It was the last election before the Glen Grey Act, and also before British Bechuanaland joined the Cape Colony.

== Results ==
Map of the results by constituency.

Parliament was dissolved on 19 December 1893. Turnout was 73%, an increase on the 67% seen in the last Assembly election in 1888.

The Afrikaner Bond won 35 of the 76 seats in the House of Assembly, which gave the Rhodes administration a comfortable majority when combined with Rhodes' 14 supporters in the Assembly. The core opposition, largely led by James Rose Innes, John X. Merriman, and JW Sauer had only around 18 seats.

Party	Seats
Rhodes-Afrikaner Bond alliance	49
Opposition	18
Others	9
Total	76

== 2nd Rhodes Ministry ==
Rhodes and his ministry would remain in office until its collapse following the Jameson Raid.

Portfolio	Minister	Term start	Term end
Prime Minister	Rt Hon. Cecil Rhodes (MLA, Barkly West)	17 July 1890	12 January 1896
Colonial Secretary	Pieter Hendrik Faure (MLA, Namaqualand)	4 May 1893	12 January 1896
Colonial Treasurer	Gordon Sprigg (MLA, East London)	4 May 1893	12 January 1896
Attorney-General	William Schreiner (MLA, Kimberley)	4 May 1893	12 January 1896
Commissioner of Public Works	John Laing (MLA)	4 May 1893	12 January 1896
Secretary for Native Affairs	Sir John Frost (MLA, Queenstown)	4 May 1893	12 January 1896
Secretary for Agriculture	Sir John Frost (MLA, Queenstown)	4 May 1893	12 January 1896
Source: The Old Cape House by Ralph Kilpin, pg.172
