= Melius de Villiers =

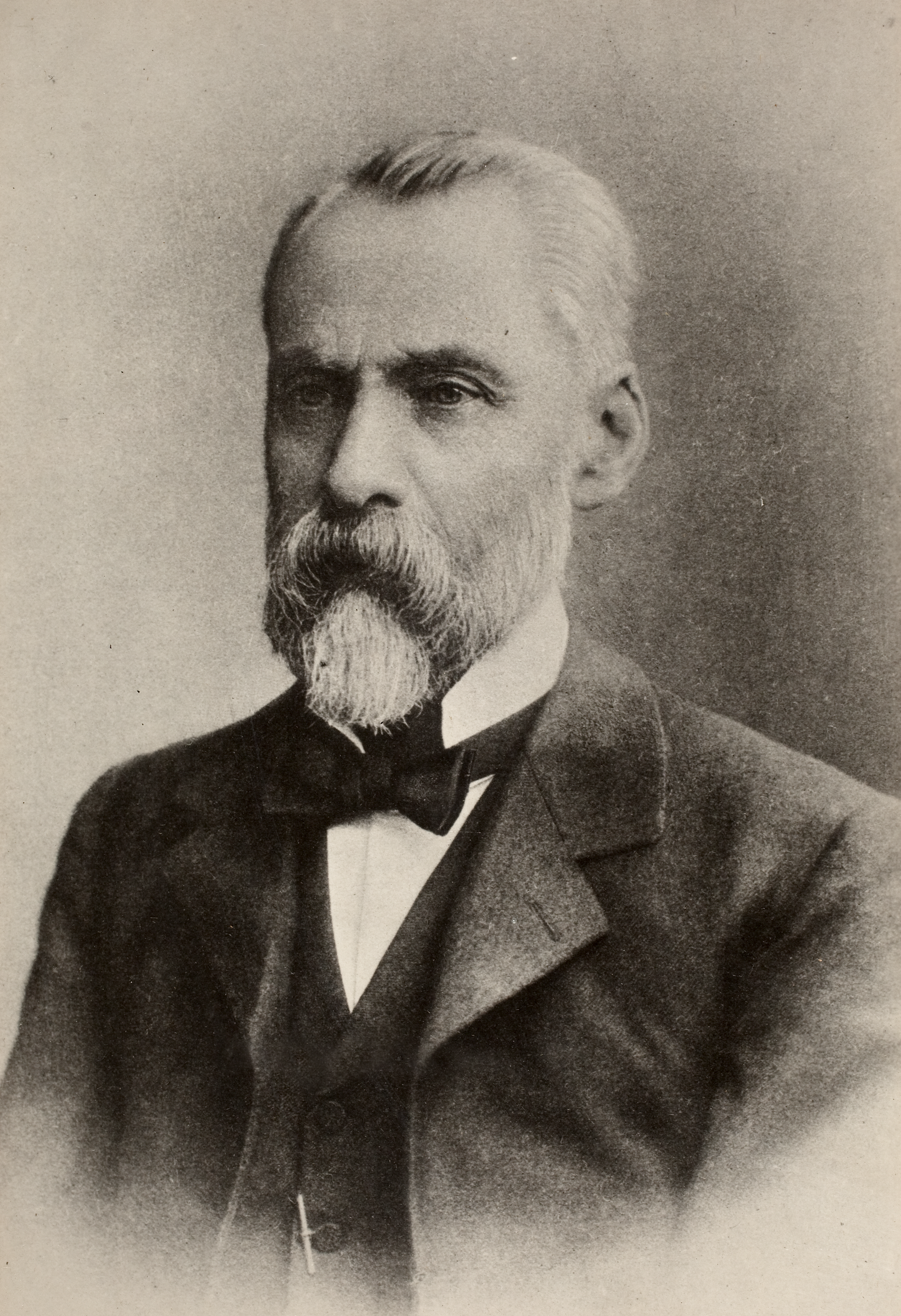

Chief Justice of the Orange Free State
- In office 1889-1901
- Appointed by: F. W. Reitz
- Preceded by: F. W. Reitz

Judge of the High Court of Justice of the Orange Free State
- In office 1876-1889
- Appointed by: Johannes Brand

Personal details
- Born: September 5, 1849 Paarl, Cape Colony
- Died: July 6, 1938 (aged 88) Kleine Zalze, Stellenbosch
- Spouse: Adelaide Holmes-Orr
- Relatives: John Henry de Villiers (brother)
- Education: Paarl Gymnasium; South African College Schools

Melius de Villiers (5 September 1849 – 6 July 1938) was a South African jurist, sometimes considered one of the country's most influential, and the last Chief Justice of the Orange Free State. His older brother was Chief Justice of South Africa John Henry de Villiers. Melius's book, The Roman And Roman-Dutch Law of Injuries, published in 1899, is an historically significant study of the actio iniuriarum and a foundational text in the South African law of delict.

== Life ==
De Villiers was born in 1849 in Paarl in the then Cape Colony and was educated at Paarl Gymnasium and SACS (later to become the University of Cape Town). After a period in Europe, he began practice as an advocate at the Cape Bar. In 1876, he became a judge of the Orange Free State, appointed by President Johannes Brand. His colleagues on he bench were James Buchanan and F. W. Reitz, whom he later succeeded as Chief Justice. During the Anglo Boer War, the British occupied the Free State, replaced its state institutions, and sent De Villiers to Cape Town as a prisoner of war. He and his family lived for a brief period in Bedford, England, and later in the Netherlands, after De Villiers was appointed the University of Leiden's first (and last) Chair of South African Law. He resigned from the Chair in 1912 for unknown reasons, moving back to Cape Town and then Kleine Zalze near Stellenbosch, where he died in 1938.

== Influence ==
De Villiers's book, The Roman and Roman-Dutch Law of Injuries, was published in 1899. It took the form of an annotated translation of Johannes Voet's commentaries on Book 47, title 10 of the Digest, but much of it was original. It is often regarded as one of the most influential works of scholarship in South African private law and is regularly relied upon by courts.

Particularly after his return to South Africa from Leiden, De Villiers became a prolific writer of journal articles, mostly in the South African Law Journal but also in the Law Quarterly Review and Yale Law Journal. In 1918, he wrote an article opposing the entry of women into the legal profession on the grounds that they should prioritise the "functions of Motherhood".
