= William Downes Griffith =

William Downes Griffith (18 July 1829 – 1908) was an Irish politician who served as the Attorney General of the Cape Colony (1866–72), the last British Attorney General there before the country attained self-government.

== Early life ==
Born in Kildare, Ireland, on 18 July 1829, he studied at Trinity College, Dublin, and was called to the bar at the Inner Temple, London, in 1855. He married Harriet Stokes on 1 October 1861.

== Attorney General (1866–1872) ==
Griffith, "literally saturated with law", emigrated to the Cape of Good Hope and served as Attorney General, succeeding the conciliatory and liberal William Porter on 20 March 1866, when that fellow Irishman retired.

Griffith was reputedly a highly pugnacious and imperious personality, with little tolerance of the locally elected parliamentary representatives and a "somewhat disagreeable manner" that alienated his colleagues. He was also repeatedly accused of knowing very little about the state and affairs of southern Africa. His term was therefore characterised by fierce antagonism with the spectrum of political interests in southern Africa.

While his relationship with the local electorate and their representatives soon became largely unworkable, much of his day-to-day labour was delegated to his quiet but over-worked subordinate, Simeon Jacobs. Jacobs, a liberal Anglo-Jewish solicitor, also ended up having to serve as acting Attorney General while Griffith traveled.

=== The rise of the "Responsible Government" movement ===
A movement supportive of self-government and local democracy was growing in the Cape, in response to what was perceived to be the ineptitude and injustice of direct imperial control. This "responsible government" movement was fiercely opposed by Griffith, who unsuccessfully worked to obstruct their bills in parliament.

Griffith drafted the most famous and prominent set of objections that were presented against the establishment of self-government in southern Africa. Among these, he pointed to the predicted effects of the Cape's multi-racial franchise and the "preponderance of the coloured races". He underlined the fact that the Responsible Government movement had strong support from the small but growing "coloured" electorate, which he predicted would soon mobilise in its entirety, and eventually comprise at least half of the Cape's voters. Griffith argued that without direct imperial control, this political change (which would almost certainly lead to responsible government) could not be countered.

After a long and bitter political struggle, the parliamentary majority of the local "Responsibles" caused the British Governor to authorise a Bill for self-government to be drafted. Griffith flatly refused to draft it, and took a strategic "leave of absence" to London. As the Attorney General was required for such a bill, Griffith's disappearance caused a serious hitch. However parliament sent for Mr Jacobs, who had long been Griffith's long-suffering right-hand man, and who was consequently very happy to travel from Grahamstown to draft the bill, outmanoeuvring the hated attorney general.

== Later life ==
After the Responsible Government movement of John Molteno gained power and instituted self-government, Griffith was quietly retired, given a pension, and replaced by the popular and locally born John De Villiers.

Griffith returned to Britain and became a county court judge (circuit no. 25) in 1877. He was the author of various legal papers, such as The Law of Bankruptcy 1868 and Practice under Judicature Acts 1875, 1877.

Political offices
Preceded by William Porter	Attorney General of the Cape Colony; 1866–1872	Succeeded by John De Villiers
