= Cape Monthly Magazine =

News journal in the Cape Colony

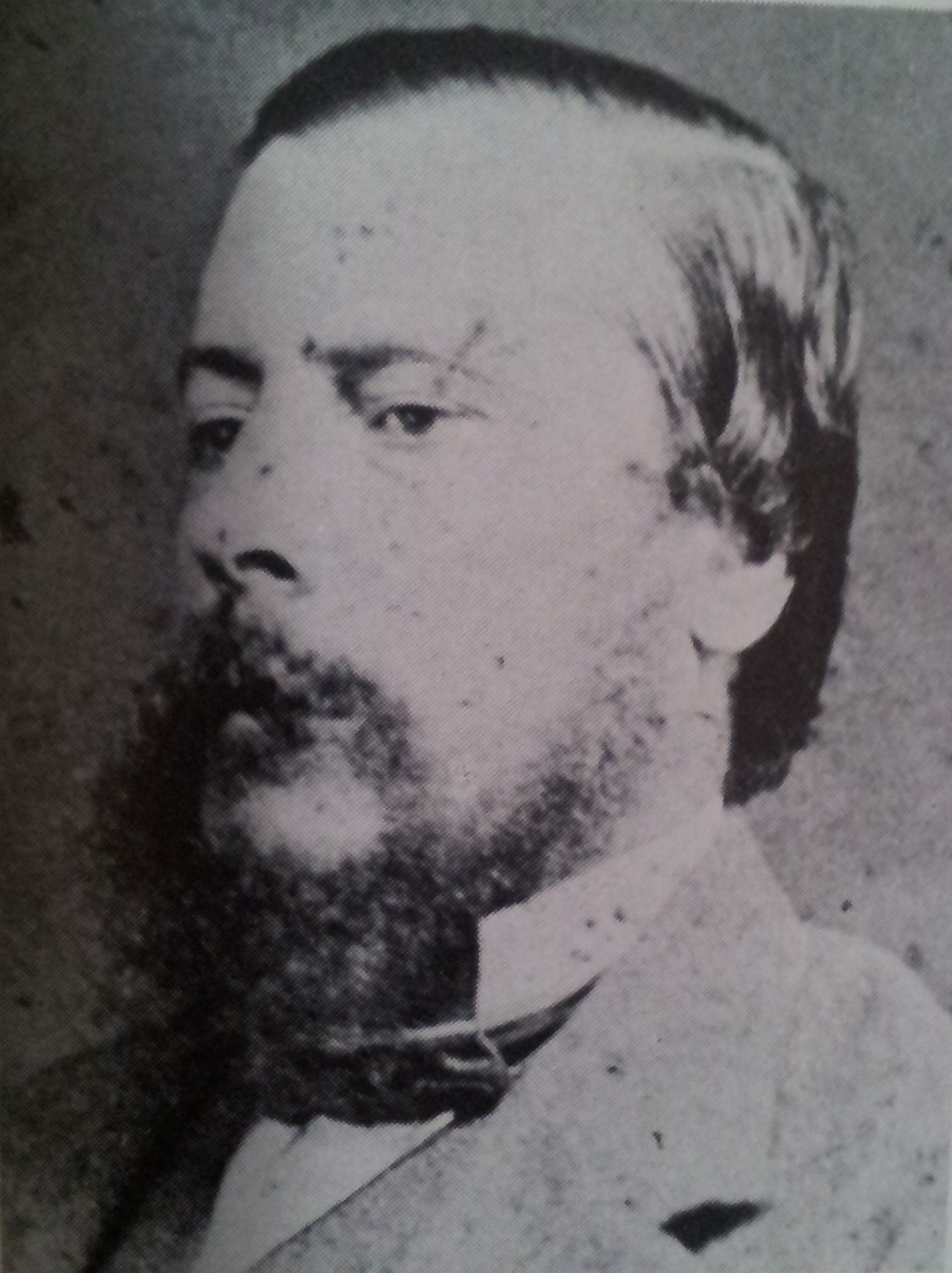
Prof Roderick Noble, editor and founder of the Cape Monthly Magazine

The Cape Monthly Magazine (1851–1881) was a news journal that was published monthly in the Cape Colony.

The most popular and famous of the Cape journals from the 1800s, it was founded in 1851 by Professor Roderick Noble (1829-1875), a Professor of Physical Science and English at the South African College from 1859, who originally hailed from Inverness, Scotland. Professor Noble co-edited the Cape Monthly with Alfred Whaley Cole (later a local Judge from 1888 until he was forced to retire due to his deafness). In 1862 Noble retired as editor. Noble was in turn also an editor with The South African Commercial Advertiser from 1864 (at the time owned by his brother John, a clerk of the Cape Parliament from 1865), and with the Cape Argus from 1872. He also returned to editing the Cape Monthly Magazine from 1870 until his death.

After Professor Noble's sudden death in 1875, aged only 46, the journal was taken over by his brother John Noble, who then served as editor until 1879.

The journal frequently took a liberal stance and a wide range of leading Cape intellectuals contributed to it - from the entire range of the political spectrum. It also included scientific articles, such as early writings on Darwinism, and studies from Joseph Orpen on San languages and rock art.
