= Andries Waterboer =

Captain of Griqualand West
- In office 20 December 1820 – December 1852
- Succeeded by: Nicholaas Waterboer

Personal details
- Born: c. 1772
- Died: December 1852
- Children: Nicholaas Waterboer

Andries Waterboer (c. 1772 – 1852) was a leader ("kaptijn") of the Griqua people.

He founded the Waterboer dynasty of Griqualand West, and led to a split of the Griqua people, as the factions of the Kok and Barends dynasties migrated to the south east to later found Griqualand East.

== Early life ==
Unlike the majority of the predominantly mixed Griqua people, Waterboer was of pure Bushman (San) origin, and seems to have been born in the wilderness somewhere north of the Orange River. His birth date is contested, although most estimates place it between 1770 and 1790.

He joined the house of the powerful ruling family of the Griquas, the Koks, took the name of "Andries Waterboer" and learned to read and write. Fiercely ambitious, he rapidly rose in rank, eventually leading his followers in an armed revolt (the "Hartenaaropstand") against the rule of Adam Kok II and Barend Barends in 1815. By the next year, he had succeeded in defeating both leaders (who migrated with their people towards the south-east) and a few years later he finally became "Kaptijn" of the remaining Griquas in a fierce leadership struggle.

== Rule (1820-1852) ==
=== Consolidation ===
Map of the Griqua states (green-blue)

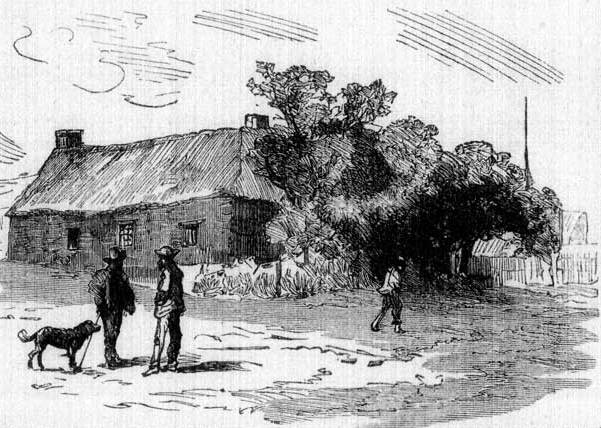
Sketch of Griekwastad

Waterboer was elected as Griqua Kaptijn (Captain) at the Kaptijns residence in Griekwastad, on 20 December 1820, but his rise to leadership had alienated a great many other powerful factions in the remaining Griqua nation. Many of these split off as separate nations, such as the fierce nomadic Bergenaars. Wars ensued, with both the Bergenaars and the Koranas. Waterboer formed an alliance with the Cape Colony to the south, however this alliance frequently faltered in the ensuing conflicts. Eventually Waterboer defeated the Bergenaars, Koranas and other Griqua factions, and consolidated his rulership.

He overhauled the administration of what was now Griqualand West (the defeated factions had moved eastwards to eventually found Griqualand East) and divided the state into four regions. His capital Griekwastad and surrounds were under his direct rule and were named "Waterboersland".

=== Regional wars ===
In 1823, in alliance with the Koks and Barends dynasties, he won the battle of Dithakong, and thereby diverted the great Mfecane migrations from Griqua territory. The next year, he fought and was victorious in a complex conflict near Fauresmith, between Cornelius Kok II and Adam Kok II, in which the Bergenaars were employed by Adam Kok.

Waterboer's territory was still threatened by marauding Bergenaar horsemen. In 1827, his capital came under siege, when it was attacked by an army of thousands of Bergenaars, in response to Waterboer's execution of 6 Bergenaar chieftains. Waterboer was eventually victorious but was much weakened by the conflict.

=== Later life ===
In 1834, he was the first neighbouring state that the Cape Colony concluded a formal treaty with. He was invited to Cape Town for the signing of the treaty, which stipulated that, in exchange for payment in money and weaponry, Waterboer would ensure peaceful relations among neighbouring states and that the Cape's border would be secured.

He was succeeded by his eldest son Nicolaas Waterboer after his death in December 1852.
