= Southie =

Southie may refer to:

- South Boston, a nickname for a predominantly Irish section of Boston, Massachusetts
- Southie (film), a 1999 film

== See also ==
- Southey (disambiguation)
- South (disambiguation)
