= Cape Mounted Yeomanry =

The Cape Mounted Yeomanry was a military force created on a militia basis by Act 5 of 1878 in the Cape Colony, with a strength of 3,000 in three regiments, to act in conjunction with the Cape Mounted Riflemen on the eastern frontier. About 600 men were put into the field for the Basuto Rebellion in 1880.

Lieutenant-Colonel Richard Southey commanded the Cape Mounted Yeomanry during the Basuto Gun War.

Twenty-six-year-old Surgeon John Frederick McCrea was a Surgeon in the 1st Cape Mounted Yeomanry during the Basuto Gun War. He was awarded the Victoria Cross for his actions on 14 January 1881, at Tweefontein, Basutoland.

In this action, the burghers had been forced to retire under a most determined enemy attack, with a loss of 16 killed and 21 wounded. Surgeon McCrea was the only doctor present and notwithstanding a serious wound on the breast bone, which he dressed himself, he most gallantly took the casualties into shelter and continued to attend to the wounded throughout the day. Had it not been for this devotion to duty on the part of Surgeon McCrea, there would undoubtedly have been much greater suffering and loss of life.

Eleven members of the 3rd Cape Mounted Yeomanry died as a result of enemy action at Morosi's Stronghold on 29 May 1879. Sixteen members of the 1st Cape Mounted Yeomanry were killed in action at Morosi's Stronghold 5 June 1879 along with seven members of the 2nd regiment.

Three hundred and six members of the unit received the Cape of Good Hope General Service Medal. Captain AL Chiapini and Trooper E McGuire received the medal with all three clasps i.e. Transkei, Basutoland and Bechuanaland.

The Cape Mounted Yeomanry was disbanded in 1881.

== See also ==
- Cape Colonial Forces
