= Joseph Orpen =

British colonial administrator (1828–1923)

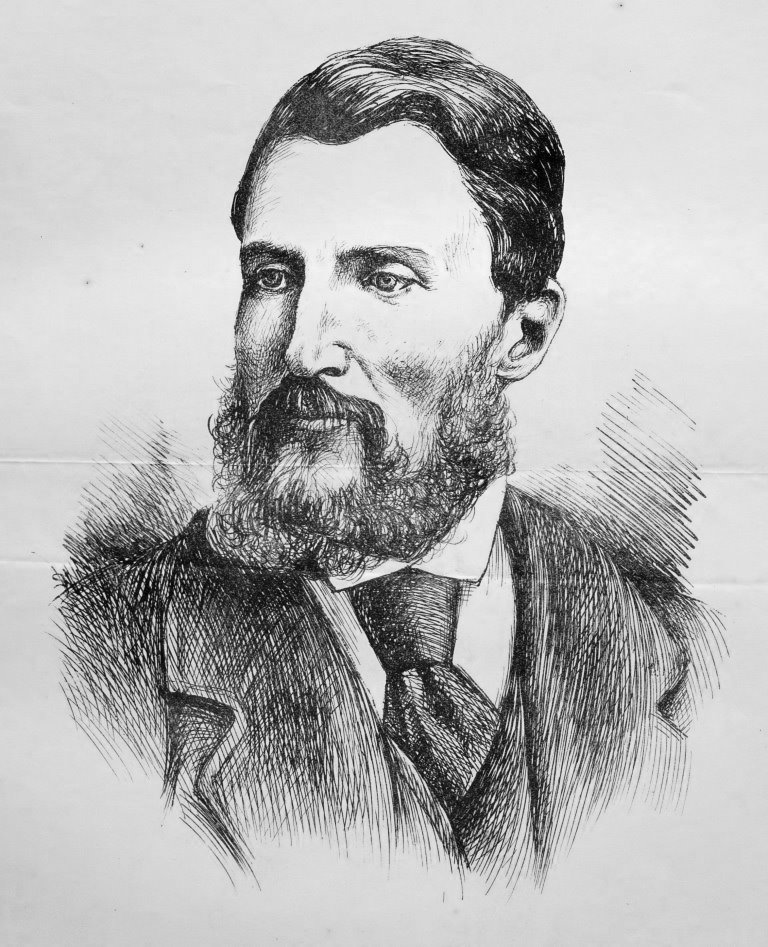
- Joseph Orpen, as MLA for Queenstown. 1872.
- Born: 5 November 1828; Dublin, Ireland
- Died: 17 December 1923 (aged 95)
- Occupations: colonial administrator, anthropologist

Joseph Millerd Orpen (5 November 1828 – 17 December 1923) was an influential colonial administrator for the British empire in southern Africa, as well as a local member of the Cape Parliament and the Orange Free State Volksraad. In addition, he was a self-taught anthropologist and a student of indigenous southern African cultures.

== Early life and politics in the Orange Free State ==
Orpen was born in 1828 in Dublin, Ireland and emigrated in 1846 to the Cape, as a land surveyor, with three of his brothers.

With his brother he moved to the Orange River Sovereignty for surveying work, and was elected in 1853 to stand against the departure of British control over the sovereignty. He then became a citizen (or "burgher") of the resulting Orange Free State. He was elected as a representative in the Volksraad (parliament) of the Orange Free State and wrote the country's constitution, influenced a great deal by that of the United States.

He served on the Free State Supreme Court and in the country's government he was for a while in charge of relations with the surrounding native African nations, and in this capacity he pursued relatively benign and peaceful policies.

As magistrate ("Landdrost") of Harrismith he founded the town of Kroonstad. This town he named in honour of a horse named "Kroon" that he had seen drown in a nearby ravine. While he was undeniably a gentle man, he also briefly commanded the Free State's military force of Boer commandos and was reputedly the first man to have shed blood in defence of the republic.

== Legacy ==
Orpen's daughter Madeleine Holland (Lee, Orpen) became a South African Poet, who studied briefly at Oxford University. Following Orpen's anthropological interests of the Native Africans, she researched the Bantu peoples of South Africa

Orpen's great grandson Andre S Holland continued Orpen's reported vocal support for Black Rights as a farmer and Politician in Rhodesia and modern day Zimbabwe.

== Politics in the Cape Colony ==
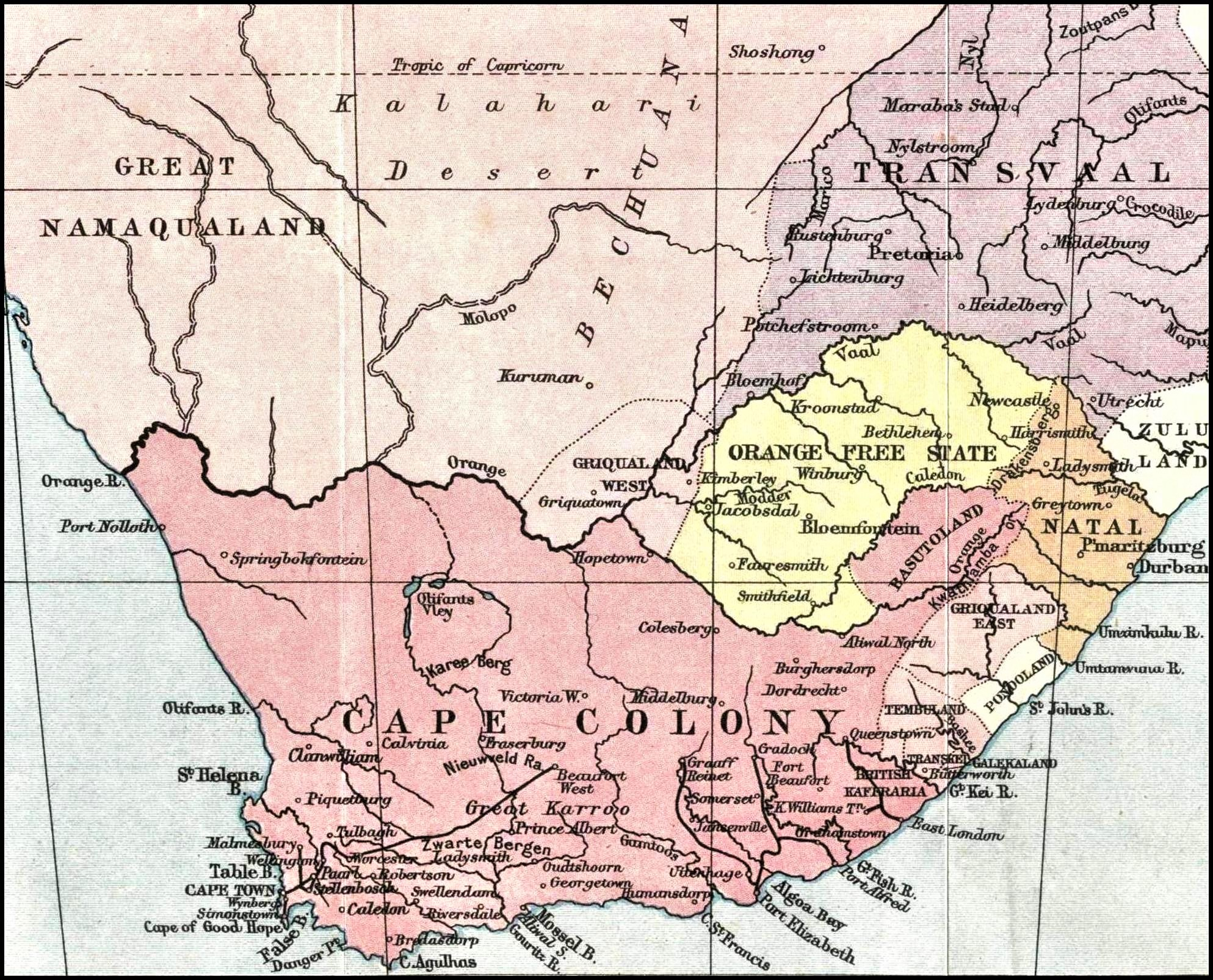
Southern Africa in 1878, on the eve of the Confederation Wars.

Orpen moved to the Cape Colony in the early 1860s. He worked again as a surveyor in the region of Aliwal North, and was commissioned by the British Imperial Government to travel to the seat of government of the Basotho King, Moshesh, in 1862. As Resident Magistrate he facilitated the annexation of Basutoland to the British Empire soon afterwards.

In 1872 he was elected to the Cape Parliament to represent the district of Queenstown. Under its new system of "Responsible Government", the Cape had just wrested a degree of independence from the British Empire. The first Cape Prime Minister John Molteno, having brought all three branches of government under local control, embarked on a policy of slowing territorial expansion, so as to concentrate on internal development of the country.

However Orpen was commissioned by the British Imperial Colonial Office, which still maintained a degree of control over the Cape, to oversee the expansion of British territory in southern Africa. British policy conflicted somewhat with that of the Cape Colony, and Orpen managed the focal point of that disagreement. The British policy at the time was to annexe the remaining independent African states, and persuade a reluctant Cape Colony to take them on, with the idea of eventually bringing the whole region into a British ruled Confederation. This put great pressure on the Cape government.

Orpen was an enthusiastic expansionist. He focused his attention on annexing to the British Empire, by peaceful means, the territories that lay between the Cape and Natal, extensive Xhosa tribal lands that comprise most of what was later to be known as the Transkei. While he disavowed violence as a means, favouring treaties, he nonetheless believed that British rule was in the best interests of all inhabitants of southern Africa. He was appointed British Resident and Chief Magistrate. He served as British Civil Commissioner for Griqualand West (1871–1873) and as British Resident for Nomansland (in Kokstad), Griqualand East (1873–1875). As the "Agent" of the British Governor, he was sent to raise and lead an army into Basutoland (then a part of the Cape Colony) in 1873, to apprehend and capture the rebellious Chief Langalibalele who had fled there from Natal.

In 1878 the Cape Colony government came into conflict with the British Governor, who overthrew its elected government to take direct control and force the Confederation plan onto the sub-continent. At around this time, Orpen left the service of the British Governor, and returned to the Cape Parliament to serve as an MP. He also reverted to his work as a surveyor. The Confederation scheme collapsed, as had been predicted, leaving a trail of destructive wars across southern Africa, that culminated in the first Anglo-Boer War.

In 1897 he retired and moved to Rhodesia as Surveyor General and became the territory's Minister of Lands and Agriculture.

In later life he was a strong opponent of the Union of South Africa, claiming it would be immensely damaging. He was also a strong opponent of the moves to restrict the political rights of Black South Africans.

== Studies of African culture and San rock-art ==
Early on, Orpen developed an intense interest in the indigenous peoples of southern Africa, of whose languages and culture he became a lifelong student.

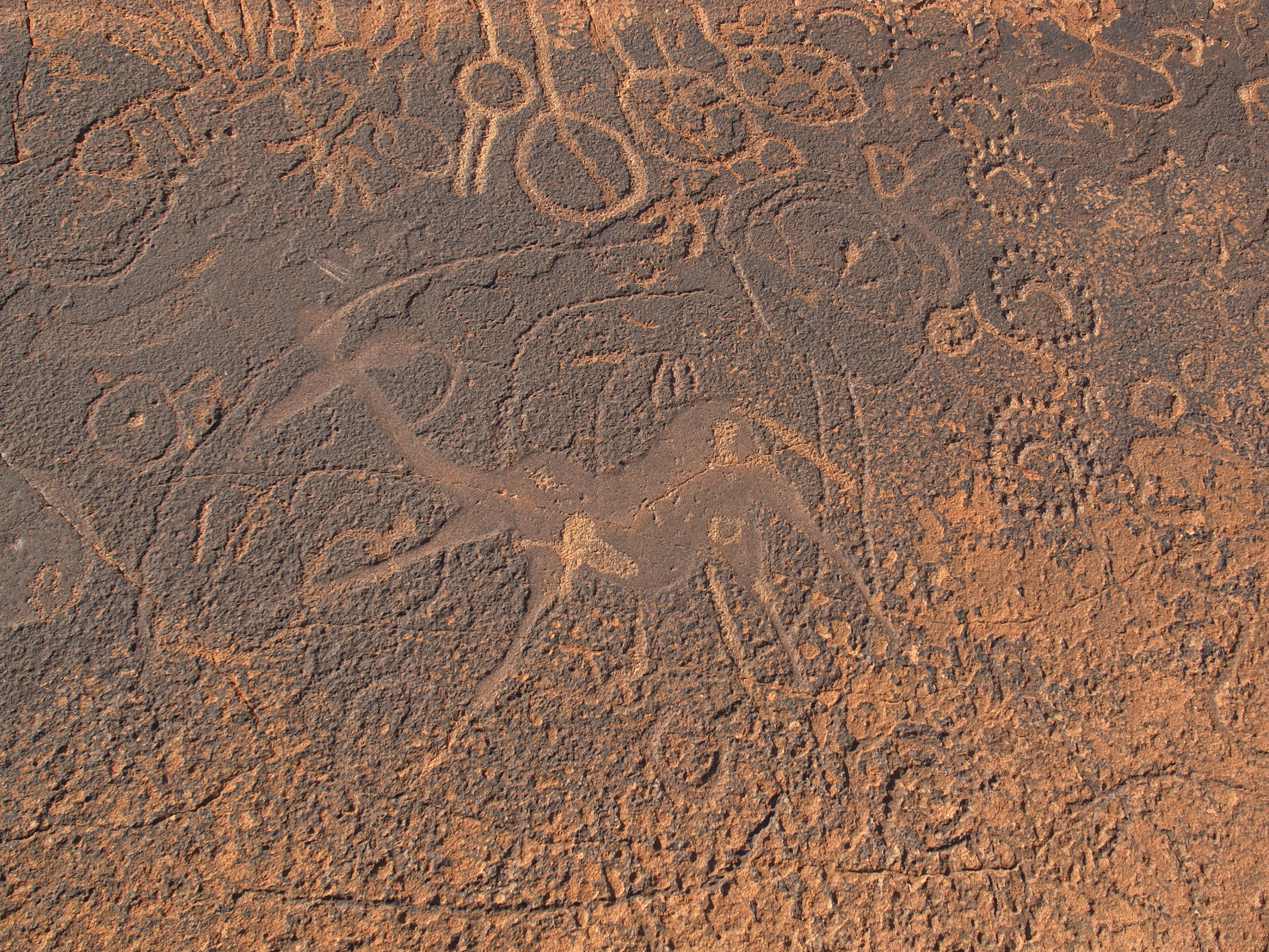
Bushman rock art, Namibia.

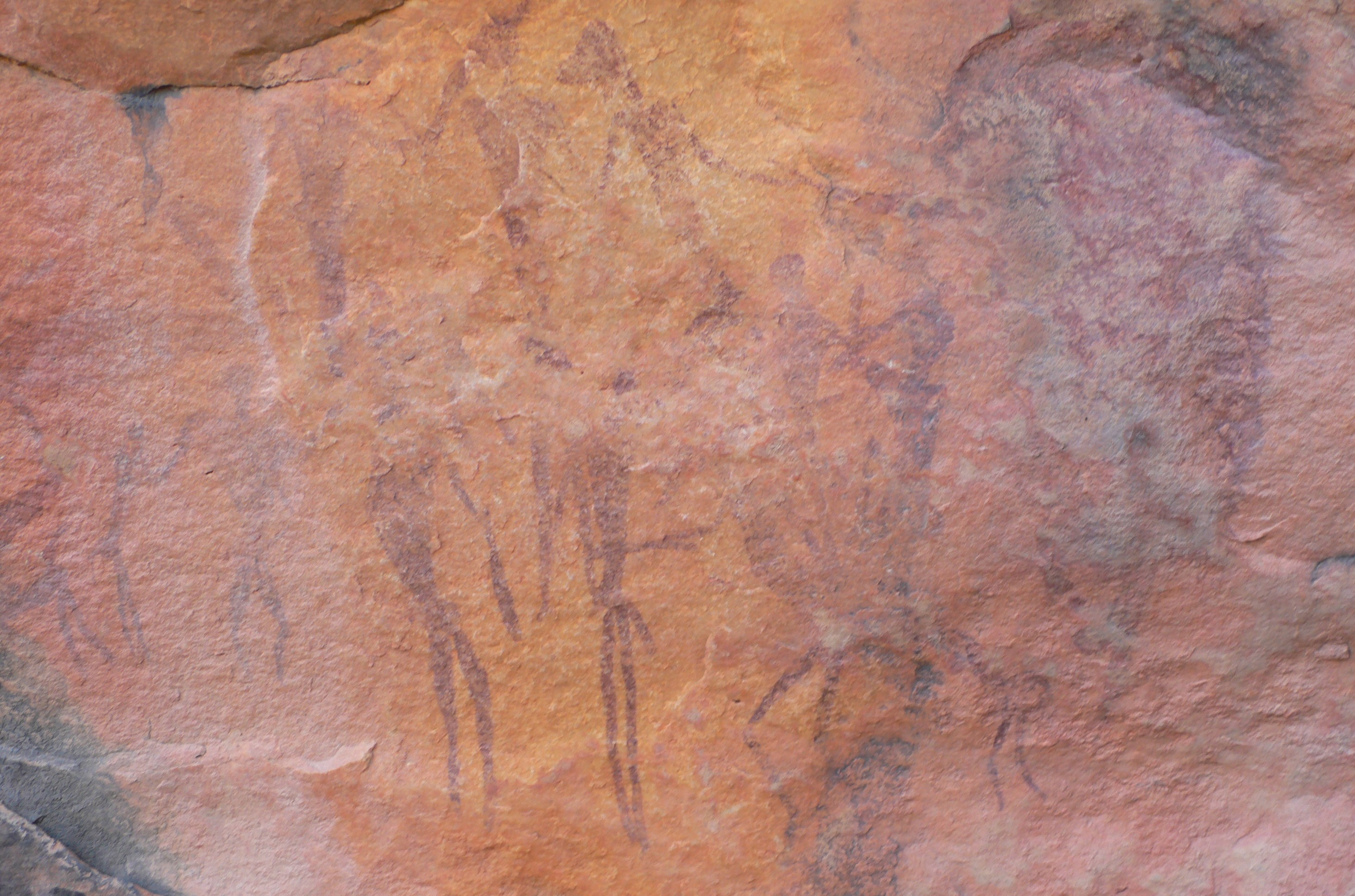
Bushman rock art, South Africa.

He also made several especially important studies of the Khoisan and specifically San rock art of the region. For this purpose, he spent a great deal of time travelling alone in the vast mountain ranges of the Drakensberg, exhaustively trying to track down any of the last surviving San people of South Africa.

The San people were the aboriginal inhabitants of much of Africa. However the Bantu migration had subsumed them centuries ago and European colonisation had exterminated most of the survivors in the Cape. At Orpen's time, they generally only survived in the remotest peripheries of the Kalahari. In most of the rest of Africa, they were extinct as a people, or at the time on the verge of extinction. Only their distinctive cave paintings (or "rock art") survived as a record of their habitation.

In 1873, while working as a magistrate for the Cape Colony in Basutoland, Orpen travelled to a particularly remote area of mountain ranges – probably the first European to do so. Here, finally, he came across a San man, whom he believed to be one of the last in that part of southern Africa. The man, whose name was Qing, was reportedly the only remaining survivor of his nation, who had been devastated by warfare with the Basotho. At the time Qing was working as a servant to a Sotho chief. Orpen befriended the man, who led him through the mountains to ancient caves rich in San rock paintings. Orpen was fascinated by the nature of the extinct culture and its world-view. He saw an opportunity to record beliefs and mythology that would otherwise soon be lost. Together, Qing and Orpen visited a great many sites in the Drakensberg mountains, with Qing explaining to Orpen the significance and meaning of the various artworks in San thought. Largely due to Orpen's meticulous recordings of Qing's information, sent to journals such as the Cape Monthly Magazine, the San rock art is today able to be interpreted. The friendship and interaction between Orpen and Qing was the only one of its kind, and the last and only time that San paintings were explained by an actual San source.

Orpen wrote several books (Some Principles of Native Government, and My Reminiscences and Life in South Africa among others.)

Political offices
Preceded by ???	British Civil Commissioner for Griqualand West; 1871–1873	Succeeded by ???
Preceded by ???	British Administrator for Nomansland, Griqualand East and the Transkeian territories 1873–1875	Succeeded by ???
Preceded by ???	Representative of Queenstown; 1872–1873	Succeeded by ???
Preceded by ???	Representative of Aliwal North; 1879–1881	Succeeded by ???
Preceded by ???	Representative of Wodehouse District; 1889–1896	Succeeded by ???
