= Owen Lanyon =

British Army officer and colonial administrator (1842–1887)

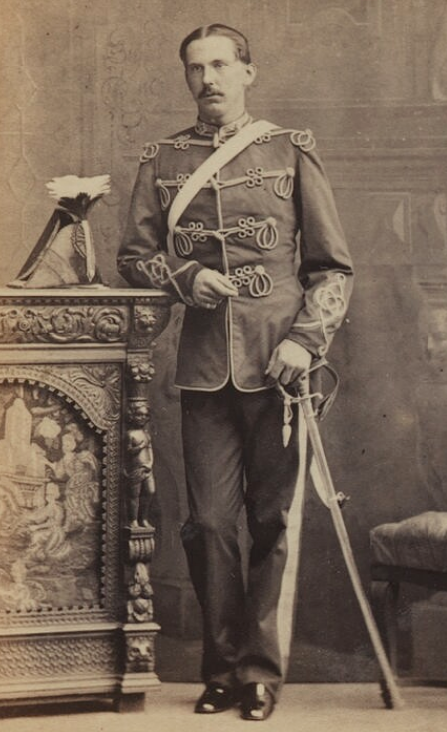
Sir Owen Lanyon

Colonel Sir William Owen Lanyon KCMG CB (21 July 1842 – 6 April 1887) was an Irish-born British colonial administrator and British Army officer.

== Early life and career ==
Lanyon was born in County Antrim, Ireland, to Sir Charles Lanyon and his wife Elizabeth Helen Owen. He was educated at Bromsgrove School before joining the army; he was commissioned into the 6th Foot in 1860, but transferred to the 2nd West India Regiment in 1866. He became private secretary to Sir John Peter Grant, Governor of Jamaica from 1868 to 1873, and was invalided in the Ashanti campaign in West Africa.

== Colonial administration in Africa ==
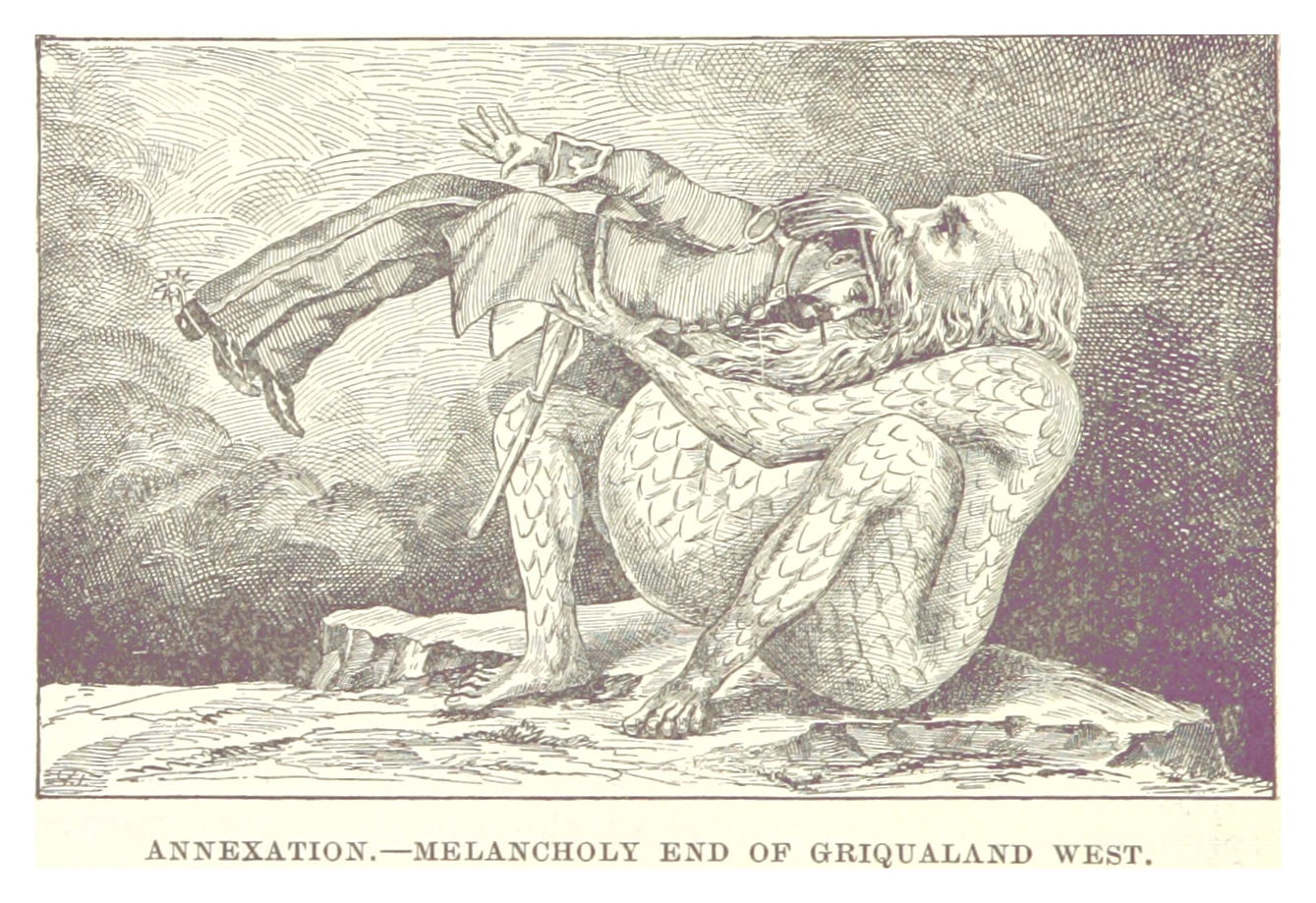
Caricature from "Incwadi Yami", showing Major William Owen Lanyon being eaten by the Cape Colony.

Lanyon served as administrator in southern African territories in the 1870s. His autocratic outlook and low opinion of the local peoples made him immensely unpopular during his terms of office.

=== Lieutenant Governor of the Griqualand West Colony (1873–1879) ===
In South Africa, he served as Lieutenant Governor of Griqualand West from 1873 until 1879. Known at the time as "the Major", his term in office was beset with controversy. Racial tensions, lawsuits as well as territorial disputes with neighbouring states caused immense turmoil. He was also extremely unpopular with the local inhabitants and had to subdue armed rebellions.

The neighbouring Cape Colony, semi-independent and the largest state in the region, was considered the only local entity with the resources to govern Griqualand West. The Cape Prime Minister John Molteno, after repeatedly refusing to annex the costly and unstable territory, eventually consented to incorporate it. With the Cape signing of the Griqualand West Annexation Act, direct British rule over the territory ended. Lanyon famously referred to Griqualand West as the most "hideous and disgusting" place he had ever seen.

=== Acting-Administrator of the Transvaal Colony (1879–1881) ===
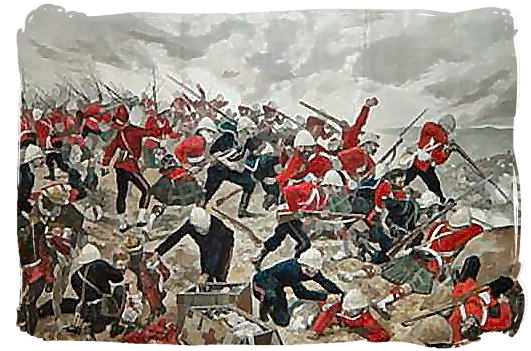
The Battle of Majuba, Richard Caton Woodville Jr.

He then took over administration of Transvaal from Sir Theophilus Shepstone on 4 March 1879, and assisted the Governor Sir Henry Bartle Frere in dealing with the restive Boer population. As in his previous position, Lanyon was immensely unpopular, with both the Boer and the Black African populations. Boer unrest steadily increased but Lanyon remained in his position until 8 August 1881, during which time the disastrous outbreak of the First Boer War took place. This saw the British defeated and evicted from the Transvaal, which returned to being an independent state under British suzerainty as the South African Republic.

Lanyon then served in the 1882 Anglo-Egyptian War.

== Later life and death ==
Lanyon became a Companion of the Order of the Bath in 1878 and a Knight Commander of the Order of St Michael and St George in 1880. He died of cancer in 1887 in New York.
