= Chief Justice of the Cape Colony =

Position in British Cape Colony legal system (1827–1910)

The chief justice of the Cape Colony was the most senior judge in the British Cape colony and the head of its Supreme Court. The office was created by the 1827 Charter of Justice, by which the colonial government overhauled the administration of justice at the Cape, and ceased to exist in 1910 upon the creation of the Union of South Africa.

== List of chief justices ==
Before 1827, the senior judicial figure at the Cape was Johannes Andreas Truter, who presided in the Raad van Justitie. After the creation of the Supreme Court, the Chief Justices were:

- Sir John Wylde (1827-1858)
- Sir William Hodges (1858-1868)
- Sir Sydney Smith Bell (1868-1873)
- Sir John Henry de Villers (1873-1910)

In 1910, the Union of South Africa was created, and De Villiers became its chief justice.
