= John de Villiers, 1st Baron de Villiers =

South African judge

The Right Honourable The Lord de Villiers KCMG PC
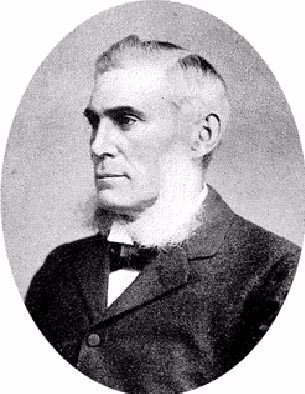

1st Chief Justice of South Africa
- In office 1910–1914
- Monarch: King George V
- Preceded by: New position
- Succeeded by: Sir James Rose Innes

Chief Justice of the Cape Colony
- In office 1874–1910
- Monarchs: Queen Victoria; King Edward VII
- Succeeded by: position replaced by Chief Justice of South Africa

Attorney General of Cape Colony
- In office 1872–1874
- Monarch: Queen Victoria
- Preceded by: William Porter
- Succeeded by: Simeon Jacobs

John Henry de Villiers, 1st Baron de Villiers, KCMG, PC (15 June 1842 – 2 September 1914) was a Cape lawyer and judge. He was Attorney-General in the Molteno Government, Chief Justice for the Cape Colony, and later the first Chief Justice for the Union of South Africa. As the country's most senior judge for 40 of its formative years, De Villiers is often considered the most influential judge in South African history.

== Early life and legal career ==
John de Villiers was the son of Charles Christian de Villiers, of Paarl, Cape of Good Hope, and his wife Dorothea Retief. His family was of French Huguenot descent and had arrived in the Cape four generations before in 1689. His younger brother was the jurist Melius de Villiers.

John Henry's father's dying wish had been that he become a minister in the Dutch Reformed Church, however after 18 months study he found that he had no true calling to the church, and switched to studying law. He studied in Berlin and London (where he read law at the Inner Temple), was called to the English bar in 1865 and the Cape bar the next year. William Porter, the Attorney General at the time, became his legal mentor and soon afterwards he entered parliament representing Worcester.

In parliament, he and Porter supported John Molteno's movement for responsible government in 1872, even helping to draft the bill that secured it.

== Attorney-General of the Cape Colony (1872–1874) ==
In November 1872, after the Cape successfully attained self-government, the country's unpopular Attorney General William Griffith was retired.

John de Villiers was called upon to replace him as Attorney-General of the Cape Colony in Molteno's cabinet. He served for only two years, from 1872 to 1874.

He was thus the first Attorney-General of the Cape under responsible government. At the time it was still legal to have a private practice, and de Villiers did so. However this work in addition to his work as legal adviser to the government and drafting parliamentary bills put severe strain on his health.

== Chief Justice (1874–1914) ==
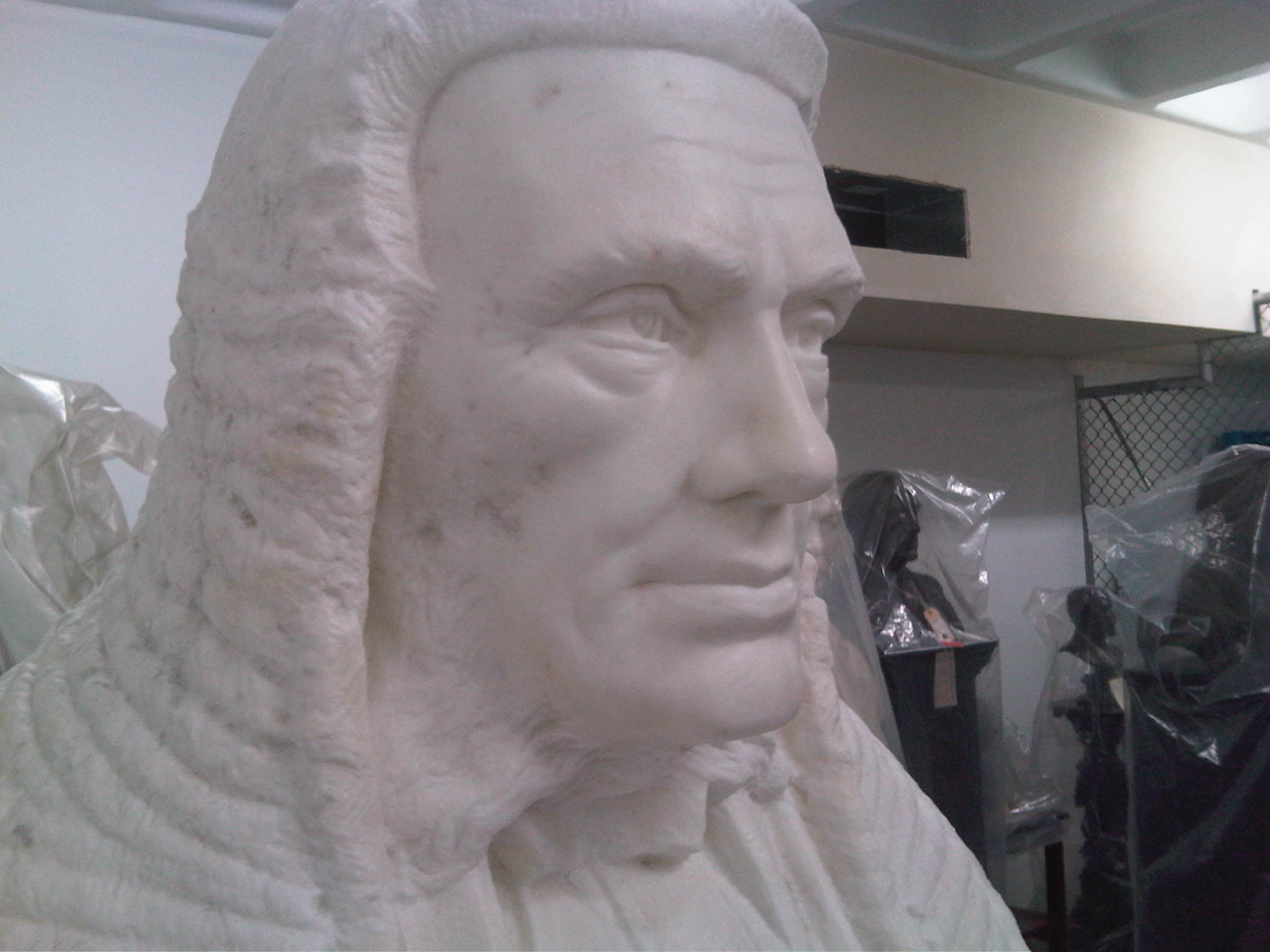
Statue of John Henry de Villiers as Chief Justice

In 1874, on Molteno's insistence, he agreed to take the office of Chief Justice of the Cape Colony - a job he performed with great dedication and skill until the Act of Union in 1910. After the Union of South Africa was created, he went on to serve as Chief Justice of South Africa from 1910 to 1914.

Altogether, he served as Chief Justice for 40 years, with "an ever-growing reputation of the highest character for independence, legal ability, and irreproachable impartiality." Although he had represented Worcester in Parliament and was very much interested in politics, John de Villiers chose not to pursue political power any further. His reserved and sensitive personality, together with a weak physical constitution and his lack of outward charisma, made him ill-suited to the rough world of politics. However his academic ability, progressive thinking, huge range of intellectual interests and driving work ethic served to make him peerless in the judiciary.

== Titles and later life ==
In 1877, he was knighted, and in 1882, he was appointed Knight Commander of the Order of St Michael and St George (KCMG). He was admitted to the Privy Council of the United Kingdom in 1897, and in 1910 he was raised to the peerage as Baron de Villiers, of Wynberg in the Province of the Cape of Good Hope and the Union of South Africa.

Lord de Villiers married Aletta Johanna, daughter of Jan Pieter Jordaan, in 1871. He died in September 1914, aged 72, and was succeeded in the barony by his son Charles Percy de Villiers. Lady de Villiers died in 1922.

== Coat of arms ==
Coat of arms of John de Villiers, 1st Baron de Villiers
Coronet A coronet of a Baron Crest Issuant from a circlet of gold embellished with nine pearls raised upon points, a dexter arm in armour embowed grasping in the hand a seax argent. Escutcheon Azure, a bend enhanced argent, on a mount in base a Paschal Lamb proper. Supporters On either side a springbok proper, gorged with a circlet of gold, embellished with nine pearls raised upon points. Motto La Main A L'Oeuvre (The hand to the work)

== Notes ==
Political offices
Preceded by William Downes Griffith	Attorney General of the Cape Colony; 1872–1874	Succeeded by Simeon Jacobs
Legal offices
Preceded by Sir Sidney Bell	Chief Justice of the Cape of Good Hope; 1874–1910	Succeeded by Office ended with Union
Preceded by New office	Chief Justice of South Africa; 1910–1914	Succeeded by Sir J. Rose-Innes
Peerage of the United Kingdom
New creation	Baron de Villiers; 1910–1914	Succeeded by Charles Percy de Villiers
