= John Frost (politician) =

South African cabinet minister and landowner

Sir John Frost KCMG (8 August 1828 – 2 April 1918) was an Anglo-South African landowner, cabinet minister and Member of the Parliament of the Cape of Good Hope.

== Early life ==
Frost was the son of William and Maria Frost, landowners in Leicestershire. He immigrated to the Cape Colony in 1849 where he built up an estate, Thibet Park, on the upper Black Kei River. He was one of the leading farmers in the Queenstown district and served as an officer in the Frontier Wars of the Eastern Cape, including the quelling of the Transkei Rebellion.

Lady Frost, his wife, was born Frances Cordelia Powell (born 20 September 1834, died 20 October 1927). She was a niece of Colonial Secretary Richard Southey. Sir John and Lady Frost lived at their country estate, Thibet Park on the Kei River. They also had a house in Cape Town, Eastbrooke House in Rondebosch. They had three daughters and five sons.

== Political career ==
In 1874 he was elected a member of the House of Assembly, representing the Queenstown district for nearly 40 years in total. In politics he was a pro-imperialist, associated with Sir Gordon Sprigg, in whose cabinet he served without portfolio. He was a Cabinet Minister as Secretary for Native Affairs in 1893 in the ministry of Cecil John Rhodes and later Secretary for Agriculture. During the Anglo-Boer War he was an advisor of the ill-fated Sir Redvers Buller. He was knighted as a KCMG in 1904.
