= William Porter (Attorney General) =

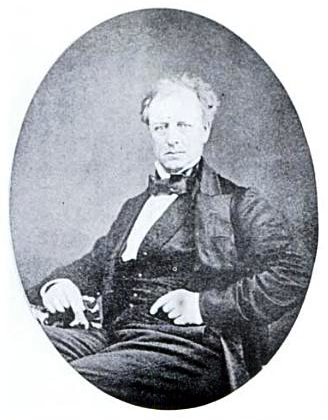
William Porter, Attorney-General, liberal statesman, writer of the Cape Constitution and a proponent of the Cape Qualified Franchise.

William Porter (15 September 1805–13 July 1880) was attorney-general of the Cape Colony and a drafter of its first constitution in 1854.

== Early life ==
William Porter was born in Ireland (Derry) on 15 September 1805 into a family with strong liberal convictions. His father William and his brothers Emmett and John Scott Porter were all Presbyterian ministers.

He read law and was called to the Bar of Ireland in 1831.

Political manoeuvrings in Britain in the 1830s led to an interim of liberal control in London, and the new government swiftly replaced conservative civil servants with known liberals throughout the Empire. Porter's family's liberal convictions, as well as his own, put him in line for such an opportunity, and in 1839 he was appointed as Attorney General of the Cape of Good Hope.

== Attorney-General (1839-1865) ==
Porter arrived in the Cape Colony, bringing what he called "an unspeakable hatred of oppression of every kind", and set about promoting equal rights and justice for all, regardless of race or class.

The prominence of his position in the Cape helped to bring liberal principles into the mainstream in the conservative colony. Several progressive local leaders such as Saul Solomon, John Molteno and John Fairbairn soon surfaced and, taking advantage of their beliefs' new acceptability, began to take control of the Cape's politics.

When the Cape was granted its first Parliament in 1854, Porter was one of the primary drafters of the infant State's constitution. The constitution prohibited discrimination on the basis of race and made provision for a franchise system where whites and blacks voted on equal terms and without distinction. This was the birth of the uniquely multiracial "Cape Qualified Franchise".

== Political career (1865-1873) ==
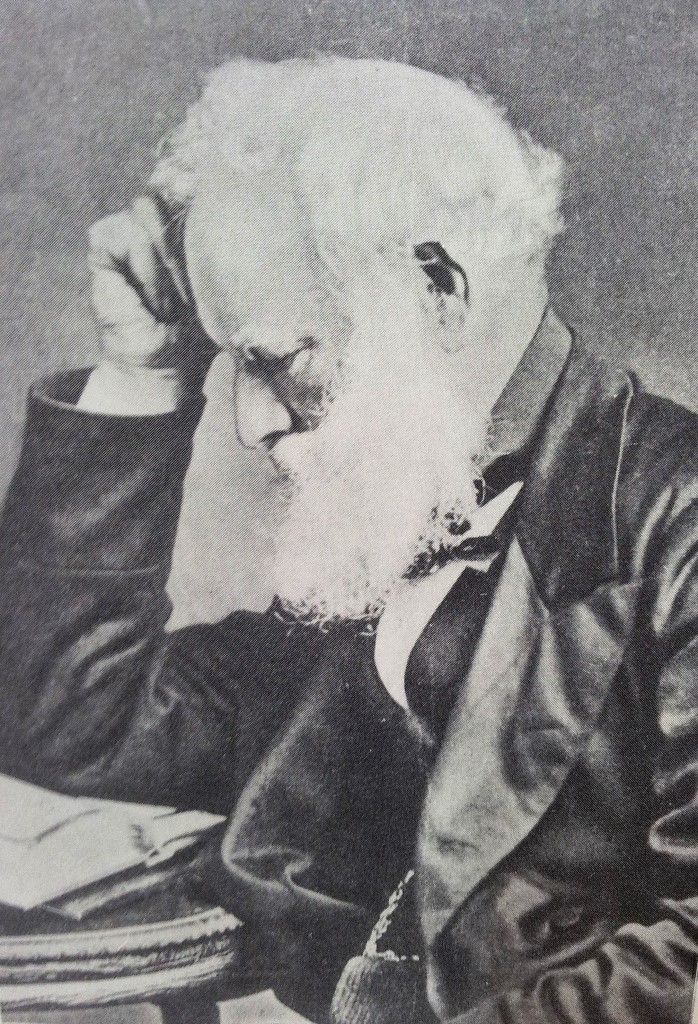
William Porter in later life.

When he retired from his position as attorney-general in 1865, his friend Saul Solomon convinced Porter to enter politics in 1869, and Porter was elected to the parliament which he had assisted in creating for the multi-member electoral district of Cape Town - winning more votes than any other candidate. Here the local leader John Molteno, who shared Porter's political views, had achieved a degree of parliamentary control, and was using this electoral base to push for the next stage in independence from Britain, a locally-accountable executive, or "Responsible Government".

Porter joined this movement for responsible government, lending his considerable moral authority as an acknowledged "father" of the Cape's constitution. His final years in politics were spent in the drive for women's rights, religious freedom, and the abolition of capital punishment in the Cape.

In 1872, the Cape finally attained Responsible Government and Molteno approached Porter with an invitation to become the Cape's first Prime Minister. Porter declined however, citing ill-health.

== Later life ==
The refusal of honours however, was quite typical for Porter's personality. He also turned down a knighthood and a chief justiceship among other offers.

He retired from politics in 1873 and returned to Ireland, leaving a prosperous, democratic, and stable Cape Colony with a rapidly growing economy. He settled in Belfast for his final years and died in 1880.

The tiny town of Porterville, Western Cape, (est.1863) was named after him.

== See also ==
- Cape Qualified Franchise
- Parliament of the Cape of Good Hope

Political offices
Preceded by Position established	Attorney General of the Cape Colony; 1839–1866	Succeeded by William Downes Griffith
