= Simeon Jacobs =

British colonial judge

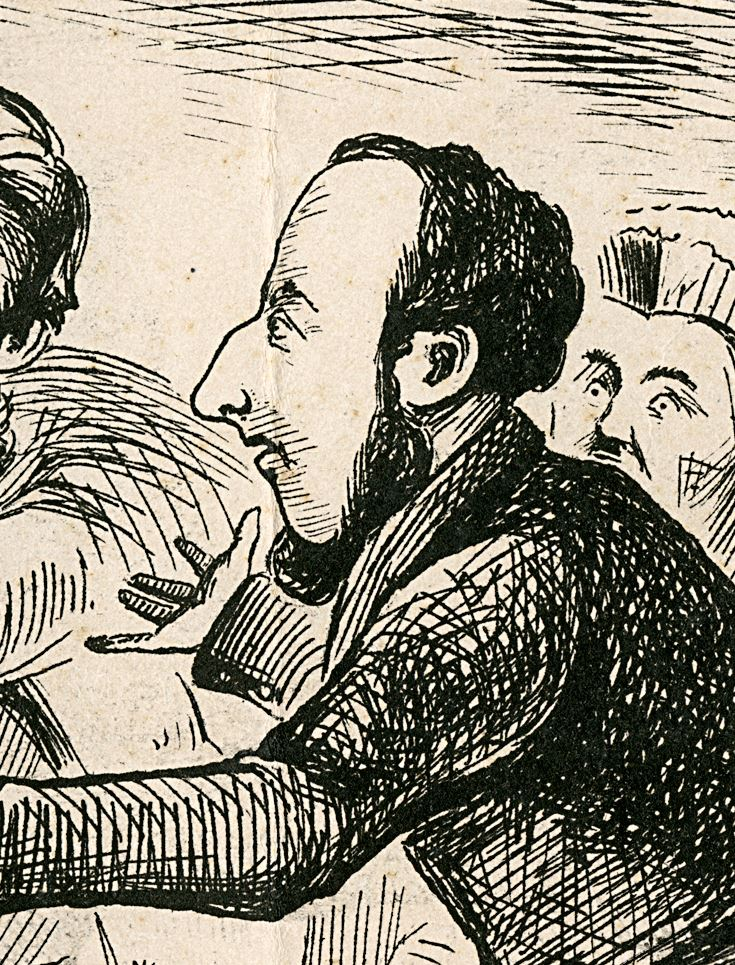
Simeon Jacobs, from a caricature in the Cape Zingari, Dec. 1873.

Sir Simeon Jacobs C.M.G. (1839 – 15 June 1883) was a Judge in the Supreme Court of the Cape of Good Hope. He served as Attorney-General and was the MP for Queenstown.

== Early life and political career ==
Born in 1839 into a Jewish family from London, Jacobs studied law and became a barrister of the Inner Temple in November 1852.

In 1860, in an attempt to improve his poor health (from which he suffered throughout his life) he emigrated to the Cape of Good Hope, and in 1861 was appointed attorney-general of the now colony of British Kaffraria, which office he held till 1866 when British Kaffraria was incorporated into the Cape Colony's eastern districts. Upon this annexation, Jacobs became "Solicitor-General at the Cape of Good Hope for the Eastern Districts".

He also served several times as acting Attorney-General of the Cape, in the absence of the Attorney General Mr Griffith, and distinguished himself greatly with his extreme industriousness. Unlike Mr Griffith, Simeon Jacobs was strongly supportive of the multi-racial nature of the Cape's constitution, and for greater Black political empowerment. Also unlike Griffith, he was strongly supportive of the growing local movement for self-government, the "Responsible Government" movement.

At the same time, he worked with the powerful MP Saul Solomon on abolishing preferential state aid to churches in the Cape Colony. Saul Solomon, while proud of his Jewish ancestry, disliked religious divisions and considered himself a member of all religions; in contrast Simeon Jacobs was strongly and overtly expressive of his Jewish identity, supporting the growth of Jewish institutions in the Cape, and was at one point the recognised leader of the Jewish community of South Africa.

== Attorney General (1874-1877) ==
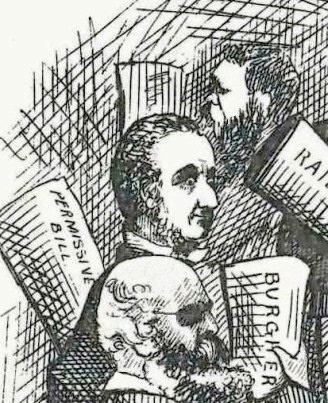
A sketch of Simeon Jacobs (centre), between Prime Minister Molteno (in his sunglasses) and Commissioner Charles Brownlee (in the background). From a set of caricatures of the Molteno government by the Lantern newspaper. 1877-1878

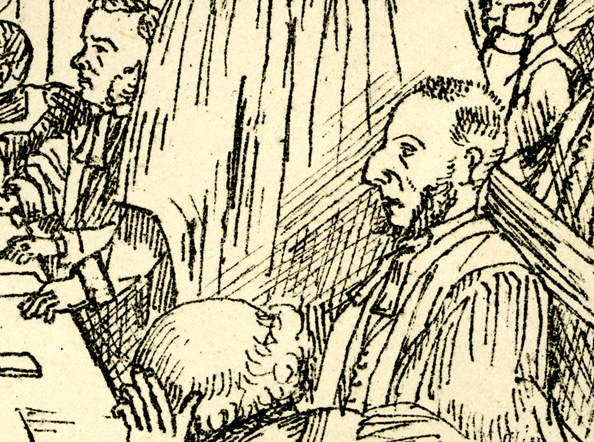
Sketch of Simeon Jacobs in later life. CT Supreme Court. 1879

In 1874, the new prime minister John Molteno, who thought very highly of him, appointed him Attorney-General of the Cape Colony, to replace John de Villiers whom he had just promoted to Chief Justice. He was also made a member of the executive council, however his extreme physical frailty worsened with age and hard work.

He was vehemently critical of Carnarvon's plan to enforce confederation on the southern African states, and spent increasing amounts of time in the final years of his career attacking it as being illegal and highly unconstitutional.

In August 1877 he retired from active life, due to rapidly declining health, to be succeeded as attorney general by Advocate Stockenstrom.

He continued to work with the Cape's executive council, but refused to serve under the following Prime Minister, John Gordon Sprigg for conscientious reasons. In 1880 he was appointed Puisne judge of the Supreme Court of the Cape Colony, but he left the Cape soon after, a very sick man. He was created C.M.G. in November 1882, and died in London in 1883, aged only 44.

== Jewish Encyclopedia bibliography ==
- Jew. Chron. and Jew. World, 22 June 1883;
- Times (London), 20 June 1883;
- Zingari, 14 March 1873;
- Cape Argus, July 1883;
- Boase, Modern British Biography.J. G.

Political offices
Preceded by Office created	Attorney General of British Kaffraria; 1861–1866	Succeeded by Office ended with annexation into Cape Colony
Preceded by Office created	Solicitor General at the Cape of Good Hope for the Eastern Districts; 1866–1874	Succeeded by ???
Preceded by ???	Representative of Queenstown; 1874–1878	Succeeded by ???
Preceded by John de Villiers	Attorney General of the Cape Colony; 1874–1877	Succeeded by Andries Stockenström (Justice)
