= Nicolaas Waterboer =

South African politician (died 1896)

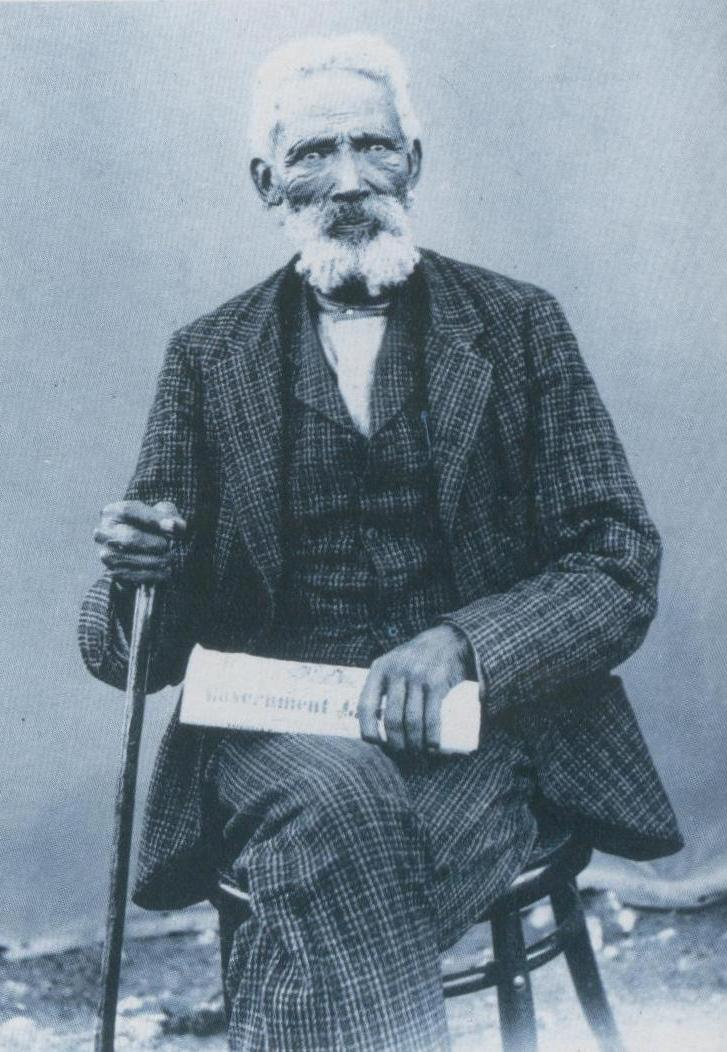
Nicolaas Waterboer in later life

Nic(h)olaas Waterboer (c. 1819 - 17 September 1896) was a leader ("Kaptijn") of the Griqua people.

He was the last fully independent Griqua Kaptijn of Griqualand West, and after it became a British colony, his rule and that of his successors was largely nominal.

== Early life ==
He was the eldest son of Andries Waterboer who had founded the Waterboer dynasty, and his wife Gertruida Pienaar.

After his father's death in 1852, Nicolaas was proclaimed the Kaptijn (Captain) of Griqualand West at the Kaptijn's Residence in Griekwastad ("Griquatown").

== Rule (1852-1896) ==
He ruled during the tumultuous era that followed the discovery of diamonds on his land in the 1860s. As enormous numbers of "diggers" arrived and the population of the diamond fields exploded, tensions grew between the different groups - including the Griquas, the indigenous Tswana people, the Boers and the white English diggers. Disagreements ensued on exactly what the borders of the semi-nomadic Griquas' land was, and a range of regional states, including the Transvaal Republic and the Orange Free State vied for ownership of the land. The Cape Colony meanwhile, the largest and most powerful state in the region, was uniquely uninterested in any form of union with the territory, in spite of strong pressure from the British to enact a form of union.

Against the backdrop of the land tensions, the diggers, led by the eccentric Stafford Parker, proclaimed the independent "Diggers/Klipdrift Republic" in 1870, but it was swiftly annexed to the British Empire as the separate colony of Griqualand West. After briefly moving to Griqualand East, Waterboer moved back to his official residence in Griekwastad in 1874 to reassume his traditional rulership.

With his agent, David Arnot, Waterboer launched a lawsuit over his land rights, which led to him losing significant portions of his territory, but which in the end he won. Waterboer was fluent in English and Dutch, as well as the native languages of his people - Afrikaans and Griqua.

He briefly led a revolt against the British Empire in 1878, which led to his arrest and brief exile to Hopetown. He later returned in 1880.

He died in Griekwastad on 17 September 1896.
