= Richard Southey (British Army officer) =

South African colonial military commander

- Born: c. 1844; Cape Colony
- Died: 1909 (aged 64–65)
- Relatives: Richard Southey (father)
- Military career
- Allegiance: United Kingdom
- Branch: British Army
- Service years: ?-1883
- Rank: Colonel
- Unit: 10th Foot
- Commands: Cape Mounted Yeomanry, Duke of Edinburgh's Own Volunteer Rifles
- Conflicts: 9th Frontier War, Basuto Gun War

Colonel Richard George Southey CB CMG (1844–1909) was a South African colonial military commander. His father, Richard Southey, was a high-ranking Cape civil servant.

Southey was commissioned into the British Army's 10th Foot (later the Lincolnshire Regiment). He purchased a Lieutenancy in 1867 and was promoted Captain in 1877. He served in the Far East before returning to South Africa. After serving in the 9th Frontier War (1877–1878), he transferred to the new Defence Department, and commanded the Cape Mounted Yeomanry. He served in the Basuto Gun War in Basutoland (1880–1881). He retired from the British Army with the honorary rank of Major in 1883.

From 1882 to 1892, Lieutenant-Colonel Southey was the staff officer responsible for the volunteer units in Cape Town, and from 1884 to 1890 he also commanded the city's senior regiment, the Duke of Edinburgh's Own Volunteer Rifles. From 1892 to 1902, he was Commandant of Volunteers, in charge of the volunteer forces throughout the colony. He introduced many reforms to raise standards of efficiency and training, and was appointed a Companion of the Order of the Bath (CB) in November 1900 for his services during the Second Boer War.

Southey was appointed Companion of the Order of St Michael and St George (CMG) in August 1901, on the occasion of the visit to the Cape of Good Hope of the Duke and Duchess of Cornwall and York (later King George V and Queen Mary). Colonel Southey's final appointment was as Colonial Military Secretary (1903–1904).
