= Richard Southey (colonial administrator) =

British colonial administrator (1808–1901)

Sir Richard Southey KCMG
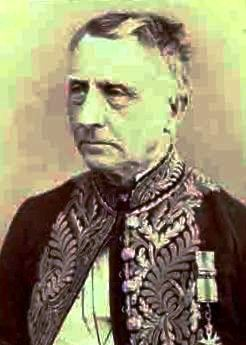

Member of the House of Assembly for Grahamstown
- In office 1876–1878

Lieutenant governor of Griqualand West
- In office 10 January 1873 – 3 August 1875
- Preceded by: Joseph Orpen as Commissioner
- Succeeded by: Owen Lanyon

Colonial Secretary for the Cape Colony
- In office 22 July 1864 – 30 November 1872
- Governor: Sir Philip Wodehouse; Henry Barkly
- Preceded by: Sir Rawson W. Rawson
- Succeeded by: Position abolished John Molteno as Prime Minister of the Cape Colony

Personal details
- Born: 25 April 1808 Culmstock, Devon, United Kingdom
- Died: 22 July 1901 (aged 93) Southfield House, Plumstead, Cape Town, Cape Colony

Military service
- Allegiance: United Kingdom
- Branch/service: Cape Colony militia
- Rank: Captain
- Unit: Corps of Guides; Albany Mounted Sharpshooters
- Battles/wars: Xhosa Wars

Sir Richard Southey KCMG (25 April 1808 – 22 July 1901) was a British colonial administrator, cabinet minister and landowner in South Africa.

== Early life ==
Southey was the son of 1820 Settlers leader George Southey of Culmstock, Devon, and later of Bloemhof Farm, Albany. He voyaged to South Africa with his family aboard the Kennersley Castle in 1820. The family were the cadet branch of a family of Devonshire gentry and were cousins to Poet Laureate Robert Southey.

== Career ==
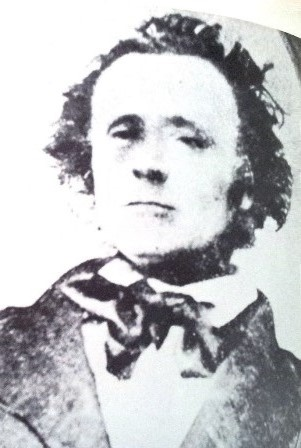
George Southey, Richard's brother who was chiefly known for shooting Xhosa King Hintsa and mutilating his body.

Southey began his career as an officer during the Frontier Wars of the Eastern Cape. He was a lieutenant in the Albany Mounted Sharpshooters and Captain of the Corps of Guides.

It was during this conflict, in May 1835, that the Xhosa paramount chief Hintsa was shot in the head by Richard Southey's brother, George. Hintsa had been taken captive by Governor Harry Smith, during peace talks, and was being guarded by Southey's Corps of Guides when he was killed while trying to escape. He was shot in the back of the head by George Southey after asking for mercy. His body was partially dismembered for trophies afterwards, by two of the Southey brothers – George and William – among others.

Richard Southey worked particularly closely with Sir Harry Smith during this time, and later became his Secretary in Natal. He went on to fill two of the highest offices in the colonial government; firstly as Treasurer (1861–1864) and later as Colonial Secretary (1864–1872), replacing his moderate colleague Rawson W. Rawson.

=== Colonial Secretary (1864–1872) ===
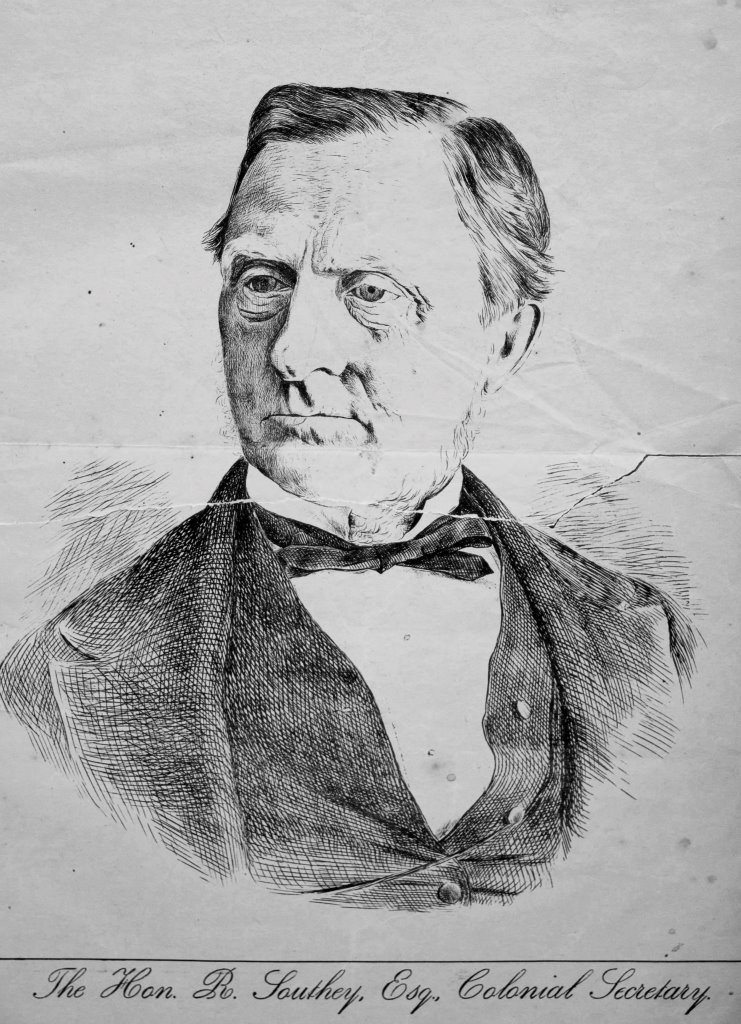
Portrait of Sir Richard Southey in the early 1870s as Colonial Secretary. Portrait by WH Schroder, published in The Zingari.

As Colonial Secretary, he consistently and strongly opposed the growing movement for "Responsible Government" (local democracy) in the Cape, that was led by his fiercest political enemy, John Molteno. He was also noted for his expansionist politics regarding the Cape's neighbouring states. He firmly believed in bringing all southern African states – especially the remaining indigenous African states – under British imperial rule. This strategy, together with his "native policy" was heavily criticised by the local Cape Parliament of the time, which was dominated by liberal politicians such as Saul Solomon.

In 1872, the Cape finally attained responsible government and Southey was then discreetly retired from the post of Colonial Secretary. In a highly unexpected move, Molteno, his victorious enemy, approached him together with the Governor and offered him the post of Prime Minister for the new country. A surprised Southey refused to have any involvement with the movement he had fought for so many years.

=== Lieutenant-Governor of Griqualand-West (1873–1875) ===
The neighbouring state of Griqualand West had recently come under British Imperial control as a separate colony, to the north of the Cape Colony. In 1873, Southey moved there and was appointed Lieutenant-Governor of Griqualand-West, where he had previously found one of the first diamonds in South Africa, on a witch doctor. He had laid it on a table before the Cape Parliament and declared "Gentlemen, this is the rock on which the future success of South Africa will be built".

He had previously also done a great deal of work in settling the boundaries and land ownership claims in Griqualand-West. In 1871, soon after the diamond discovery, the land was being claimed by the local Griqua people (represented by their agent David Arnot), by the Orange Free State, by the British, and even by migrant diggers who had staged a revolt. Southey had engineered the eventual British takeover, persuading Chief Waterboer to accept British protection. Griualand-West itself was annexed to the Cape soon afterwards, ironically thereby gaining Responsible Government, which Southey was so firmly against.

In Griqualand, as in the Cape Colony, he was a firm proponent of British imperial expansion and favoured British annexation of the neighbouring Tswana states. (This controversial annexation of "Bechuanaland" was eventually carried out, but only a decade after Southey had left Griqualand.)

=== Eastern Cape Opposition (1876–1878) ===
Southey's opposition to responsible government still had considerable support among the British settler population of the Eastern Cape, who were predominantly supportive of more direct imperial rule and of annexing the neighbouring Xhosa land of the Transkei. When Southey returned to the Eastern Cape, he was soon elected to the Cape Parliament as the member for Grahamstown. In this capacity, he joined fellow easterners John Paterson and Gordon Sprigg, as the opposition to the Cape's ruling government. Southey's career finally ended in 1878, when Britain suspended the Cape government and assumed direct control of the Cape Colony.

== Later life and family ==
His residence in Cape Town was Southfield House in Plumstead, where he died in 1901.

His first wife was Isabella Shaw (1810–1869). After her death he married Susan Krynauw (1842–1890) who became Lady Southey. He had two daughters and eight sons, including Richard Southey who gained distinction as a military commander. His niece was Lady Frost, born Frances Cordelia Powell, married to Sir John Frost.
