= 1854 Cape Colony parliamentary election =

- January to May 1854

All 46 seats in the Assembly (lower house) 24 seats are needed for a majority All 15 seats in the Council (upper house) 8 seats are needed for a majority
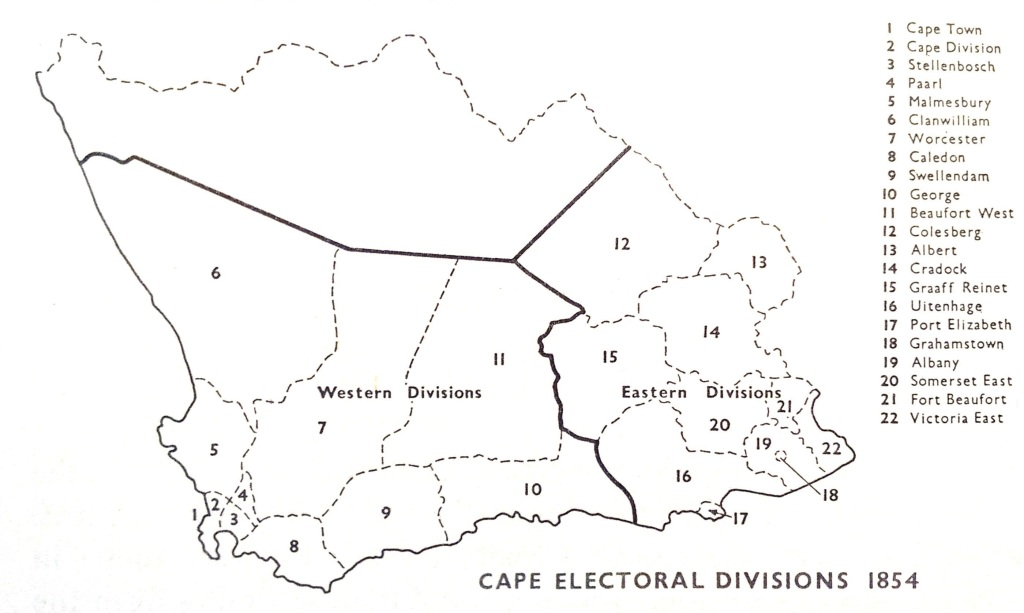
- Provinces and electoral districts.

The first election for the Parliament of the Cape of Good Hope was held in 1854. There were no clear party lines, however many representatives for Eastern electoral districts subscribed to a common programme which emphasised separation from the Cape Colony or moving the seat of colonial government eastward, a vagrancy law, or increasing the property qualification part of the franchise (which would have reduced the number of non-Whites able to vote).

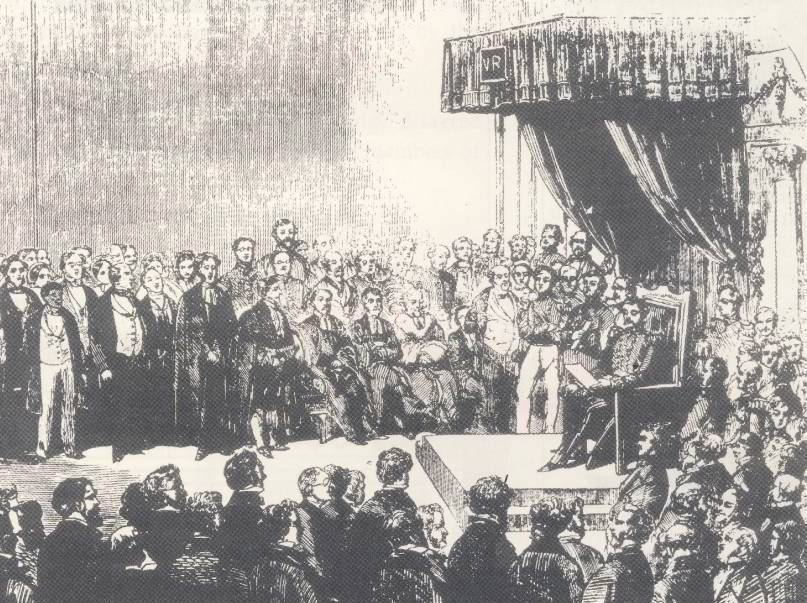
The opening of the first Cape Parliament by Governor Sir George Grey, at the Tuynhuys.

== Electoral system ==
=== Voting system ===
The election was conducted on the basis of the multi-racial Cape Qualified Franchise: Cape residents qualified as voters based on a universal minimum level of property ownership, regardless of race.

Elections to the upper house, the Cape Legislative Council, were conducted under a cumulative voting electoral system. This gave each voter several votes, which they could give to a single candidate, or split amongst several. This was justified by the Report from a Committee of the Board of Trade and Plantations on the basis that it would prevent any single group gaining a monopoly on power, as a minority voting in unison could ensure the return of their preferred candidate. The Cape Colony White population at the time was majority Boer, with British settlers forming a minority. The British Government had pushed for the franchise property qualification to be low, thereby extending the franchise to the non-white population, who it was believed were more likely to side with the British than the Boers.

The population for the colony was estimated at 225,000 in 1853, with coloureds outnumbering whites by a ratio of 55:45. The ratio of registered voters however was heavily in favour of whites.

=== Constituencies ===
For elections to the House of Assembly, the Cape was divided into 22 electoral divisions, returning a total of 46 members. The electoral division boundaries corresponded with the existing Cape Colony fiscal divisions. The only exceptions to this were for Albany, and the urban areas of Cape Town-Green Point and Grahamstown, (which were not included in the Cape electoral division), which had their own electoral divisions.

== Members ==
1854 Inaugural Council (Upper house)
- Western Province:
  - Howson Edward Rutherfoord
  - Francis William Reitz, Sr.
  - Joseph Barry
  - Johan Hendrik Wicht
  - John Bardwell Ebden
  - Dirk Gysbert van Breda
  - Johannes de Wet LLD
  - Henry Thomas Vigne
- Eastern Province:
  - Andries Stockenström
  - Robert Godlonton
  - George Wood
  - Henry Blaine
  - Willem Simon Gregorius Metelerkamp
  - William Fleming
  - Gideon Daniel Joubert
1854 Inaugural Assembly (Lower house)
- Western Province Districts:
  - Hercules Crosse Jarvis, Cape Town
  - Saul Solomon, Cape Town
  - James Abercrombie MD, Cape Town
  - Francois Louis Charl Biccard MD, Cape Town
  - James Mortimer Maynard, Cape Division (southern Cape Peninsula)
  - Thomas Watson, Cape Division
  - Petrus Jacobus Bosman, Stellenbosch
  - Christoffel Brand LLD, Stellenbosch
  - Pieter Frederik Ryk de Villiers, Paarl
  - Johan Georg Steytler, Paarl
  - Frederick Duckitt, Malmesbury
  - Hugo Hendrick Loedolff, Malmesbury
  - Bryan Henry Darnell, Caledon
  - Charles Aiken Fairbridge, Caledon
  - Augustus Joseph Tancred DD, Clanwilliam
  - Johannes Hendricus Brand LLD, Clanwilliam
  - Egidius Benedictus Watermeyer LLD, Worcester
  - John Percival Wiggins, Worcester
  - John Molteno, Beaufort
  - James Christie, Beaufort
  - John Fairbairn, Swellendam
  - John Barry, Swellendam
  - Henry William Laws, George
  - Frans Adriaan Swemmer, George
- Eastern Province Districts:
  - James Thackwray, Grahamstown
  - Charles Pote, Grahamstown
  - Thomas Holden Bowker, Albany
  - William Cock, Albany
  - Johannes Christoffel Krog, Uitenhage
  - Stephanus Johannes Hartman, Uitenhage
  - John Paterson, Port Elizabeth
  - Henry Fancourt White, Port Elizabeth
  - Robert Mitford Bowker, Somerset East
  - Ralph Henry Arderne, Somerset East
  - Jeremias Frederik Ziervogel, Graaff-Reinet
  - Thomas Nicolaas German Muller, Graaff-Reinet
  - Charles Lennox Stretch, Fort Beaufort
  - Richard Joseph Painter, Fort Beaufort
  - John George Franklin, Victoria East
  - James Stewart, Victoria East
  - Johannes Petrus Vorster, Albert
  - Jacobus Johannes Meintjes, Albert
  - James Collett, Cradock
  - William Thornhill Gilfillan, Cradock
  - Johan Georg Sieberhagen, Colesberg
  - Ludwig Johan Frederik von Maltitz, Colesberg
