= John Sweet Distin =

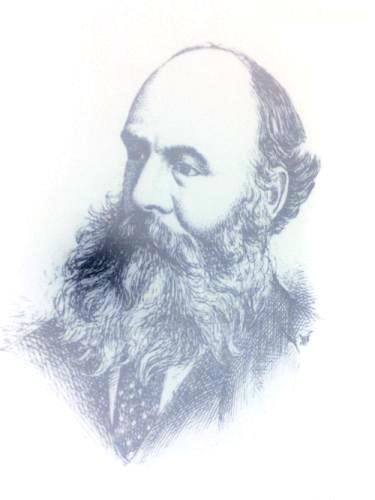
John Sweet Distin in later life

John Sweet Distin MLA (19 August 1826 – 2 August 1902) was a prominent member of the Parliament of the Cape of Good Hope.

== Early life and farming ==
Distin arrived in the Cape in 1846 when his family's ship was sailing past on its return from New Zealand. He jumped overboard from his ship and swam ashore in Table Bay.

He found work as a soldier and then as a trader of the eastern frontier of the Cape Colony. He later became a farmer in Hantam, in the Middelburg District, Eastern Cape in the 1860s, and made his fortune in Ostrich farming. With his new fortune he built up his estate, Tafelberg Hall. (However, later when the Ostrich boom ended, his business declined.) In Cradock in 1831 he married Selina White (1830-1900), daughter of John and Mary White of Grahamstown. The couple had 11 children.

== Political career ==
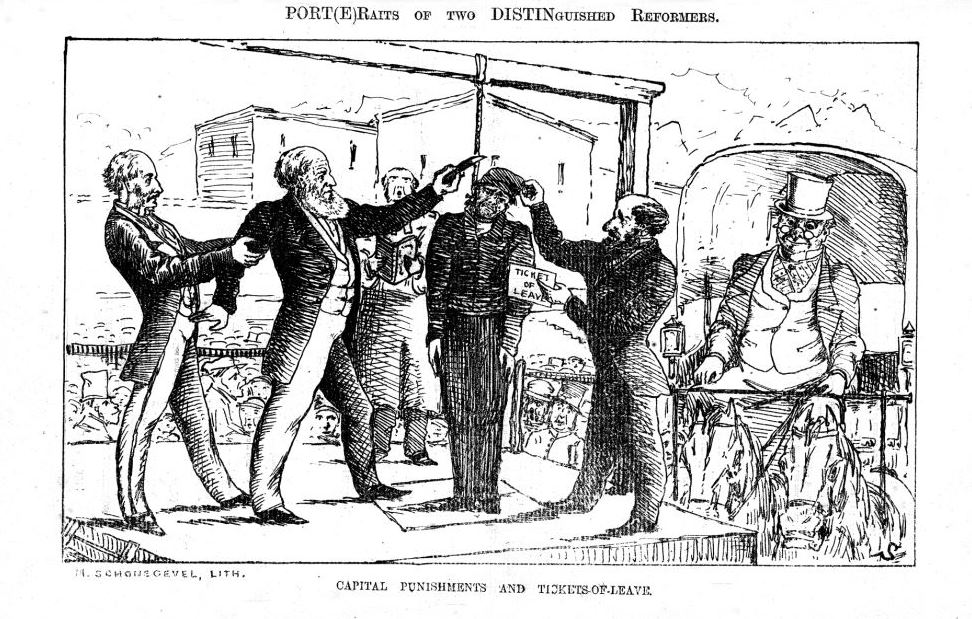
1869. William Porter (left) and Distin (right) as "exeter hall" liberal reformers.

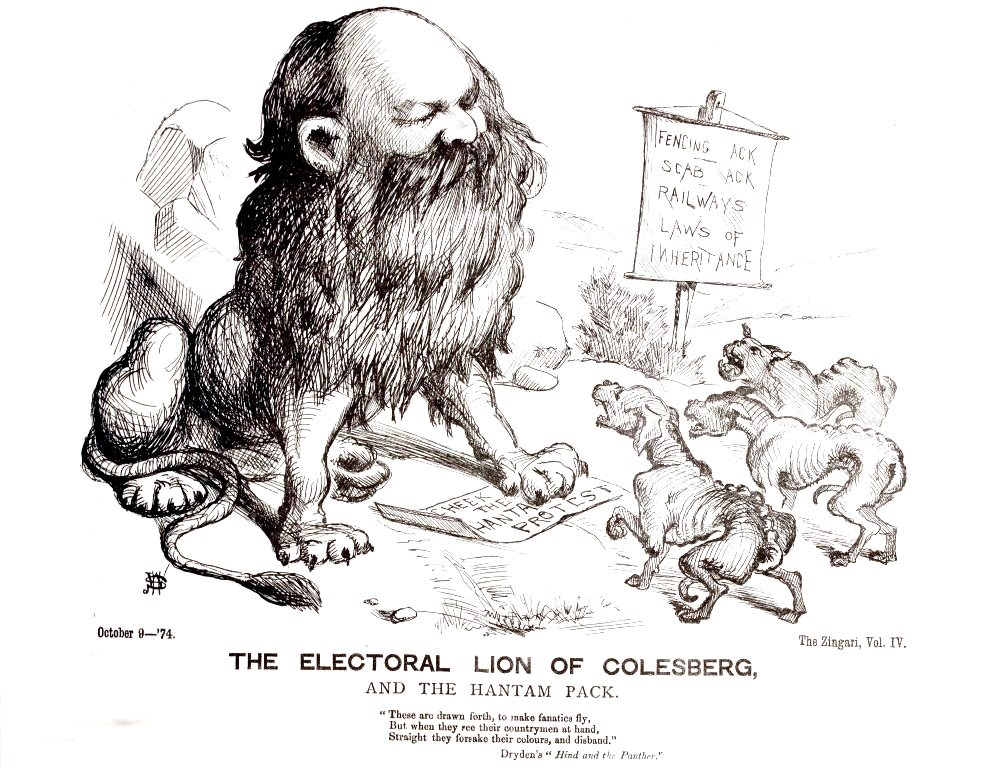
1874. Distin caricatured facing down a minority of conservative critics in his constituency who had objected to his support for liberal measures in Parliament.

He was elected as Member of the Cape Parliament, for the Middelburg and Fort Colesberg district.

He was notable in the 1860s for his liberal and inclusive policies, and for his support of humane measures (together with William Porter) such as opposition to the death penalty.

He was also one of the first of a group of Eastern Province MPs who converted to the movement for democratic self-rule (or "Responsible Government") in the Cape Colony, and he fought for it up until it was introduced in 1872. He later gained the nickname "the Lion of Colesberg" - partly because of his enormous beard, and partly as a joke, on account of his friendship with the elderly leader of the responsible government movement John Molteno, who had a very similar mane-like beard which had long earned him the nickname, the "lion of beaufort". Once self-rule was instituted in 1872, Distin became one of the most passionate supporters of the new Cape government, as it began extensive infrastructure projects whilst under growing pressure from the London Colonial Office which was desiring to reassert imperial control in southern Africa. Distin's blunt and informal language in the General Assembly made him relatively famous during this period. In parliament Distin was described as a small man, with a most characterful nose and accent; but also with a most genial and straightforward personality, "rough-and-ready" and friendly.

He was a passionate advocate for introducing stock fencing across the Colony, and eventually lost his seat in parliament due to his persistence.
