= South African International Exhibition =

World's fair held in Cape Town, Cape Colony, in 1877

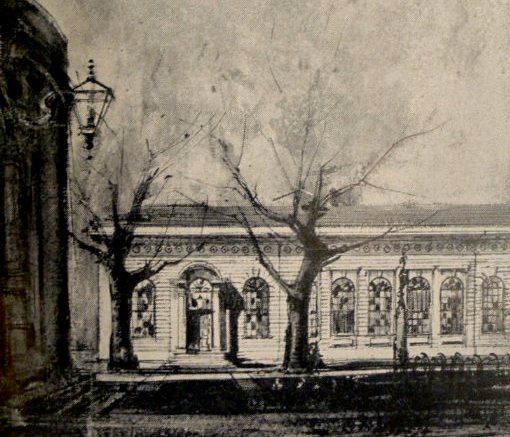

Overview
- BIE-class: Unrecognized exposition
- Name: South African International Exhibition

Participant(s)
- Countries: At least 5 (including colonies), potentially 11 or more

Location
- Country: Cape Colony
- City: Cape Town, Cape Colony
- Coordinates: 33.9282485°S 18.41851°E

Timeline
- Opening: 15 February 1877
- Closure: 17 November 1877

The South African International Exhibition was a world's fair held in Cape Town, Cape Colony in 1877. It was officially opened on 15 February of that year by Henry Bartle Frere.

== Location ==
The exhibition was held inside a custom-made building that was constructed out of glass and iron in a style reminiscent of The Crystal Palace that housed London's Great Exhibition. It was located on the grounds of the Freemasons' Lodge de Goede Hoop, which was being used as the Parliament of the Cape of Good Hope at that time.

== Exhibits ==
During 1876, Signor Cagli had canvassed American and European industries to exhibit “manufactures of all kinds”, which were to be grouped in 10 classes: alimentation, chemicals (perfume, medicine and surgical equipment), furniture, fabric and jewelry, transport vehicles and equipment, hardware, machinery, agriculture, science and education, and miscellany such as fire extinguishers. Cagli's proposal was supported by the then-Colonial Secretary, Lord Carnarvon.

The only countries and colonies with known recorded exhibitors include Great Britain, the Cape Colony, Natal, the Orange Free State, and Griqualand West. However, representatives of the exhibition organizers were present and accepting submissions during the preceding months in "Paris, Berlin, Vienna, Turin and Amsterdam." As such, it seems likely that exhibitors from France, the German Empire, Austria-Hungary, the Kingdom of Italy, and the Netherlands also presented at the fair. Individual exhibitors included: Wertheim safes; Taylor's sewing machines, who won a medal; Sheffield-based Samuel Marshall, who showed hooks, hay knives, scythes and sheep shears; and linen manufacturers Rylands & Sons, who won a prize (followed by another a year later at the Paris exhibition).

== Aftermath ==
After the exhibition, the main building was used as an assembly hall and a theatre, aptly called the Exhibition Theatre. In the afternoon of 21 February 1892, around 3:30 PM, carpenters and scenery painters were preparing for a new play when a fire broke out near the theatre entrance. In less than one hour, the entire building was destroyed, along with the adjoining Masonic Lodge and Native Affairs Office.
