= Murison =

Murison is a surname. Notable people with the surname include:

- Alexander Murison (1847–1934), Scottish academic lawyer
- George Murison (1819–1889), Canadian mayor
- James Murison (c. 1816–1885), member of the Legislative Council of the Parliament of the Cape of Good Hope
- James Murison (c. 1705–1779), Scottish minister
- Sir James William Murison (1872–1945), Scottish colonial judge
- Krissi Murison (born 1981), British music journalist
- William Murison (1837–1877), New Zealand politician and cricketer

== See also ==
- Ian William Murison Smith (1937—2016), Professor of Chemistry at the University of Birmingham
- Murrison
