= Murrison =

Murrison is a Scottish surname, usually considered to be a variant of Murison.

The name is predominantly connected with Aberdeenshire and is patronymic in origin, meaning "son of Muris". Muris was a variant of Maurice, a name introduced to Scotland by the Normans.

== People named Murrison ==
- Jimmy Murrison (born 8 November 1964), Scottish lead guitarist with the band Nazareth
- Andrew Murrison (born 24 April 1961), British Conservative politician

== See also ==
- Murison
