= James Murison (politician) =

Captain James Murison MLC
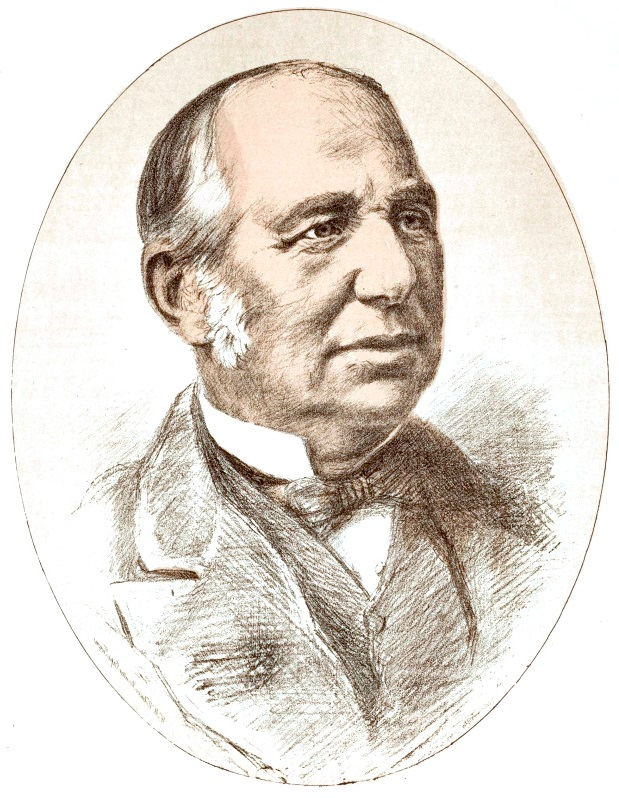
- Captain James Murison, MLC

Captain James Murison MLC (c. 1816 – 1885) was a member of the Legislative Council of the Parliament of the Cape of Good Hope.

Born in 1816 in Scotland, in his youth Murison worked in Greenland and Spitzbergen. He came to the Cape Colony as mate on the brig Sir William Heathcote in 1838, settled in Sea Point, Cape Town, and set up a coastal trading company that predominantly traded with Mauritius. He ultimately developed a wide range of business interests. He became known as a campaigner against larger businesses and monopolies. He and his brother Gordon were among those who attempted in 1850 to establish the "Cape Chamber of Commerce" to provide an alternative to the older Commercial Exchange which was controlled by larger businesses. In the 1850s he was involved in the setting up of a lighthouse at Cape Point. In 1860 he was appointed (along with Hercules Jarvis and Saul Solomon) to the Cape Town Harbour Board.

Murison's brothers Andrew and George took James's opposition to monopolies to the extreme and, in their fight against the monopoly on the guano trade from the Penguin Islands, they actually organised a fighting force armed with pistols and cutlasses, sailed to Ichaboe and attacked the trading outposts there. James Murison distanced himself from his brothers' actions.

In 1876, the Cape's mail contract was divided between shipping lines to increase competition. Via his shipping firm Anderson & Murison, Murison was the agent for the Castle Mail Packet Co. with Power of Attorney. A famous and characterful figure locally, Murison was dubbed the "figurehead of Table Mountain, a prince among men" and "public-spirited, incorruptible and generous".

He was initially asked to stand as Member for Cape Town in the lower house of the Cape Parliament, but declined. He also subsequently declined an invitation to stand for the upper house in the same parliament. He finally accepted to stand for the upper house. In his political office, he was one of the MPs which the right wing newspapers of the time disparagingly dubbed "the Malays", due to their relying substantially or mostly on the Muslim electorate of Cape Town.

He died at his Sea Point home in 1885.
