= Parliament of the Cape of Good Hope =

Historic legislature of the British Cape Colony

Parliament of the Cape of Good Hope Parlement van die Kaap die Goeie Hoop
- Coat of Arms

Type
- Type: Bicameral
- Houses: • Legislative Council; • House of Assembly

History
- Founded: 1853–1854
- Disbanded: 1910; 116 years ago

Structure
- Seats: 107 (Legislative Assembly; 1910)
- Legislative Council political groups: Government (17): South African (17); Opposition (8): Progressive (8); Crossbench (1): Independent (1)
- Legislative Assembly political groups: Government (69): South African (69); Opposition (33): Progressive (33); Crossbench (5): Independent (5)

Elections
- Legislative Council voting system: Cumulative voting proportional representation (Legislative Council)
- Legislative Assembly voting system: Highest averages method (House of Assembly)
- First Legislative Council election: 1854
- Last Legislative Council election: 1908

Meeting place
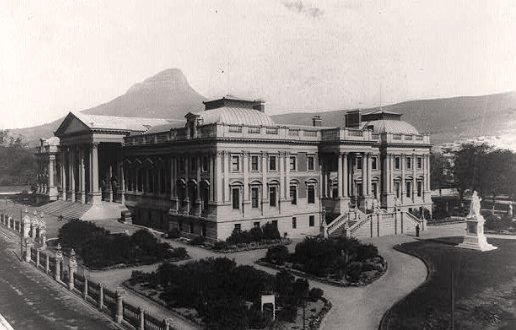
- Cape Parliament; Cape Town, Cape of Good Hope

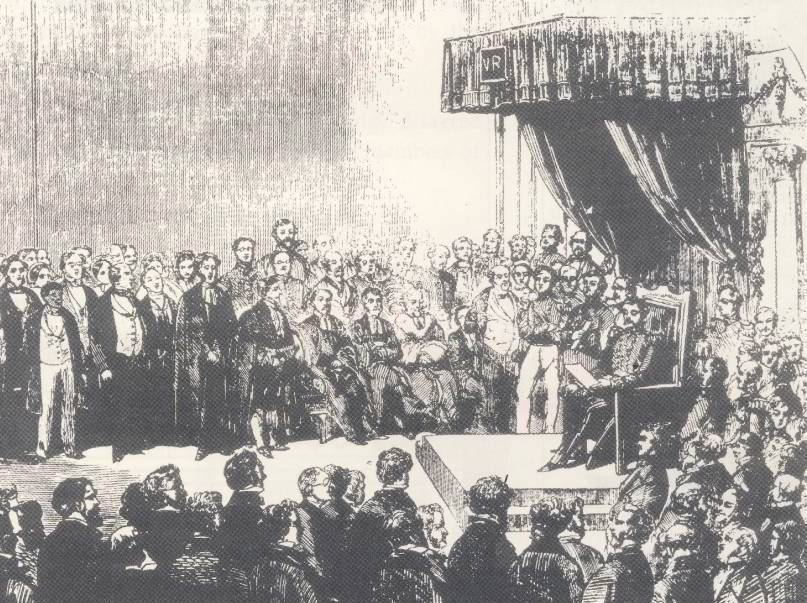
Engraving of the first opening of the Cape Parliament in 1854.

The Parliament of the Cape of Good Hope functioned as the legislature of the Cape Colony, from its founding in 1853, until the creation of the Union of South Africa in 1910, when it was dissolved and the Parliament of South Africa was established. It consisted of the House of Assembly (the lower house) and the Legislative Council (the upper house).

== The First Parliament ==
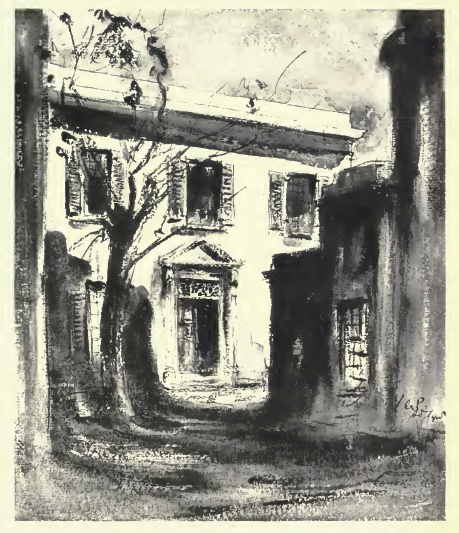
The Cape's Legislative Council.

Prior to responsible government, the British government granted the Cape Colony a rudimentary and relatively powerless Legislative Council in 1835.

The British attempt to turn the Cape into a penal colony for convicts, similar to Australia, resulting in the Convict crisis of 1849, mobilised the local population in the 1840s and threw up a generation of local leaders who believed that far-away Britain was not capable of understanding local interests and issues. This group of politicians, which included the likes of William Porter, Saul Solomon, John Fairbairn, John Charles Molteno, Andries Stockenström and Hercules Crosse Jarvis, shared not only a common belief in the importance of local self-government, but also an explicit commitment to a liberal, inclusive and multi-racial political system.

This political elite successfully began the controversial drive for Cape independence which, unusually, was attained in the end through gradual evolution, rather than sudden revolution.

=== Representative Government (1853) ===
Queen Victoria granted the Cape its first Parliament in 1853, and the local leadership were permitted to draft a constitution. This was a relatively liberal document that prohibited race or class discrimination, and instituted the non-racial Cape Qualified Franchise, whereby the same qualifications for suffrage were applied equally to all males, regardless of race. The pre-existing Legislative Council became the upper house of the new parliament, and was elected according to the two main provinces of that Cape at the time. A new lower house, the House of Assembly, was also constituted. However, the parliament was weak and executive power remained firmly in the hands of the Governor who was appointed from London.

The Governor opened this first parliament at his residence, "the Tuynhuys", but the House of Assembly soon relocated to the small but stately Goede Hoop Masonic Lodge buildings. The old Legislative Council (now reconstituted as the Parliament's upper house) was housed at the nearby Old Supreme Court building (now the Iziko Slave Lodge Museum).

=== Responsible Government (1872) ===
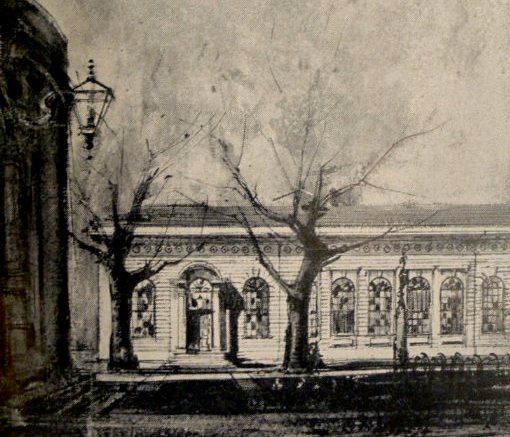
The Masonic Lodge which served as the venue of the first Cape Parliament.

Among the Cape's powerful local leaders, a radical faction under the leadership of John Molteno pushed for further independence in the form of "Responsible Government". This was attained in 1872, after a political struggle that lasted a decade. "Responsible Government" brought all branches of the Cape's government under local control by making the Executive directly "responsible" to Parliament and electorate for the first time.

There followed a brief boom period in the history of the Cape, with the economy surging, the frontiers stable and local democracy taking root. The new constitution held the non-racial nature of its political system as one of its core values. The universal qualification for suffrage (£25) was sufficiently low to ensure that most owners of any form of property or land could vote; and there was a determination on the part of the Government not to raise it, on the understanding that rising levels of wealth would eventually render it obsolete. There were the early beginnings of a drive to register the many new potential voters, particularly the rural Xhosa people of the frontier region, who were mostly communal land owners and therefore eligible for suffrage. Opportunistic politicians soon followed, to campaign for Black African voters.

The new government based itself in the halls of the Masonic Lodge where the previous parliaments had sat. This relatively humble building was seen as suitably central and close to the Legislative Council building. The large gardens of the Lodge soon became a popular venue for the public, with concerts, theatre and finally the "South African International Exhibition" which Molteno sponsored in 1877. The Parliamentary hall itself was open to members of the public, also explicitly "irrespective of class or colour", should they wish to observe the performance of their representatives.

The operating language of the parliament in the early years of Responsible Government was English, though Afrikaans was often spoken informally. Dutch was added by parliamentary act in 1882, by MP "Onze Jan" Hofmeyr with the powerful support of Saul Solomon. A statement was also made, on its introduction, that the recognition of a "Native" language, as a third official language, would also be acceptable, but only once sufficient "Native" parliamentarians were elected.

== The new Parliament building ==
=== The building fiasco ===
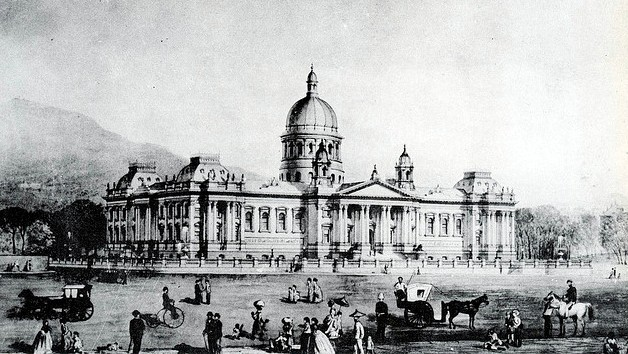
Freeman's original elaborate plan for the new Parliament.

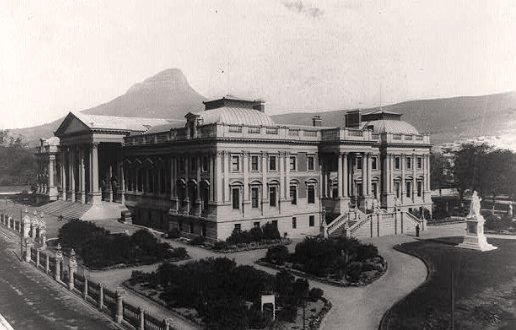
The final Parliament building as constructed (without statues, dome or fountains)

From the beginning of Responsible Government, there were increasingly vocal complaints from members of parliament about the humble appearance of their venue. MPs increasingly complained that the Parliament would not attract sufficient respect from "the public and strangers", unless a more grandiose edifice were constructed.

A brief controversy arose about this need to build a more stately Parliament, as Prime Minister Molteno was not an ostentatious man, and had little interest in spending tax money on what he saw as essentially an expensive vanity project (At the time an enormous countrywide programme was underway, of building schools, public transport and communications infrastructure, and funds were consequently in tight demand). He was over-ruled by the legislature however, and the Commissioner of Public Works, Charles Abercrombie Smith, ordered a select committee to receive designs.

The committee selected the elaborate proposal of the renowned architect Charles Freeman (architect), at the time an officer in the Public Works Department. Sites that were mooted for the new building included Greenmarket Square, Caledon Square and the top of Government Avenue, but eventually the current site was selected. Freeman was made resident architect and construction began on 12 May 1875, with Governor Henry Barkly laying the cornerstone.

Almost immediately it was discovered that Freeman's plans were faulty. Freeman's errors were compounded by the presence of groundwater, and a recalculation of the budget revealed that the actual costs would be many times the original figure that the government had allowed for.

The Cape government stepped in. Freeman was fired for incompetence and the Public Works Commission was re-structured. There was initially some discussion in parliament about abandoning the half-finished building. However, the government ordered the project completed, even though the budget was now calculated to be many times the original sum. In 1876 it appointed Henry Greaves to alter Freeman's plans, fix the faulty foundations, and see the project successfully through. Moreover, it ordered him to remove from the plan the statues, parapets, fountains, elaborate dome and other expensive flourishes.

Building re-commenced, but was delayed – this time by the British annexation of the Transvaal in 1878, the ensuing First Boer War, and finally by the building company going bankrupt in 1883. Greaves tenaciously completed the job however, and the large, stately, but relatively unpretentious Parliament building was finally opened in 1884.

Cape Prime Minister Thomas Scanlen, and Governor Hercules Robinson led the opening ceremony in the building, declared finally to be worthy of the country's Legislature.

=== The restricting of the multi-racial franchise ===
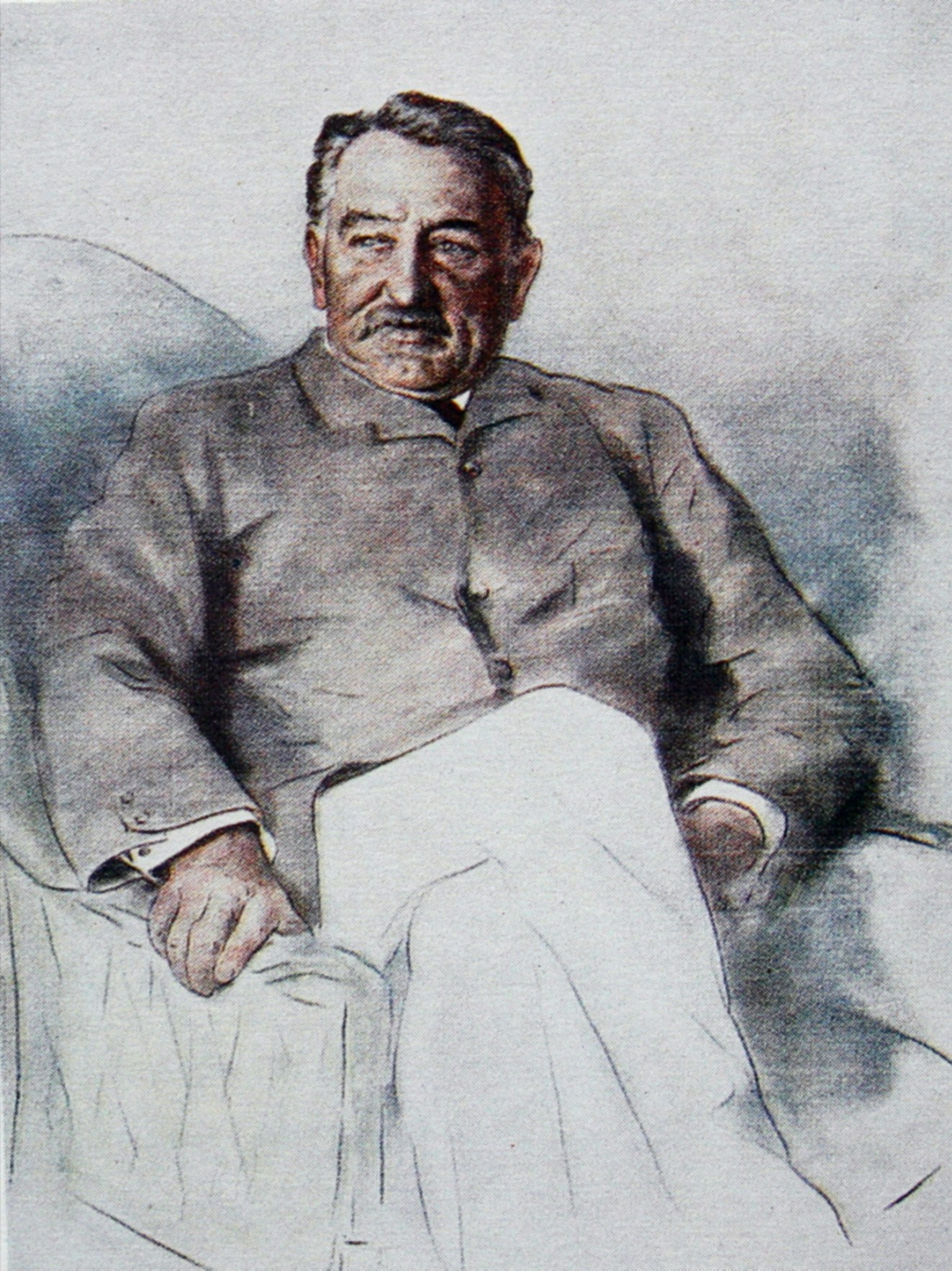
Cecil Rhodes, as Prime Minister, did much to restrict African representation in the Cape Parliament.

Over the years, as the Cape's early generation of political heavy-weights died or retired, power moved away from their liberal heirs, and towards right-wing opposition politicians who saw the multi-racial franchise as a threat to white political control.

This racist opposition had its origins in the white Eastern Cape separatist movement who had been threatened by the political mobilisation of their Xhosa neighbours. It gained office under Prime Minister Gordon Sprigg, and eventually reached the height of its power as the pro-imperialist "Progressive Party" under Prime Minister Cecil Rhodes, the most dictatorial and aggressively expansionist leader in Cape history.

The liberals (now on the defensive, as the opposition "South African Party") attempted to further mobilise the Cape's Black population in a desperate attempt to find allies to the liberal & multi-racial cause. However they were outmanoeuvred by Rhodes and his allies, who imposed increasingly severe legal restrictions on the African franchise. As fast as the African voters mobilised, their numbers were diminished through discriminatory legislation.

The Parliamentary Registration Act (1887) removed traditional African forms of communal land-ownership from the franchise qualifications, thus disenfranchising a large portion of the Cape's Xhosa population. Rhodes's Franchise and Ballot Act (1892) finally succeeded in raising the franchise qualification from £25 to £75, disenfranchising the poorest classes of all race groups (including poor whites) but effecting a disproportionately large percentage of the African voters. It also added literacy as a franchise qualification, intended to target the (still mostly illiterate) Xhosa voters of the Cape. Finally, the Glen Grey Act (1894) re-drew the laws on rural African land tenure and effectively disqualified nearly all rural Africans from the vote.

The result was that, by the end of Rhodes's Ministry, only a small portion of relatively wealthy, educated, urban Black Africans were still permitted to vote. Decades later, with the rise of Apartheid after Union, all restrictions were removed for White voters, meaning that the remaining qualifications of the Cape Qualified Franchise only applied to non-whites.

=== Move towards Union ===
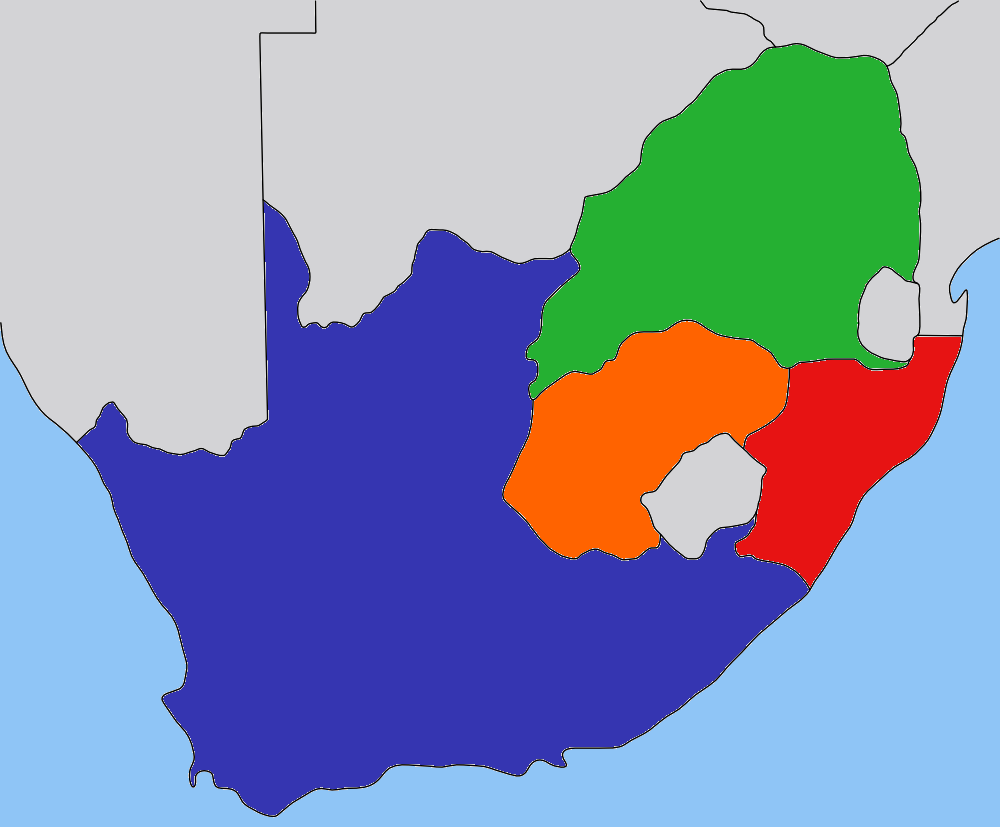
On Union, the Cape (blue) was to be united with Natal (red), Transvaal (green) and the Orange Free State (orange).

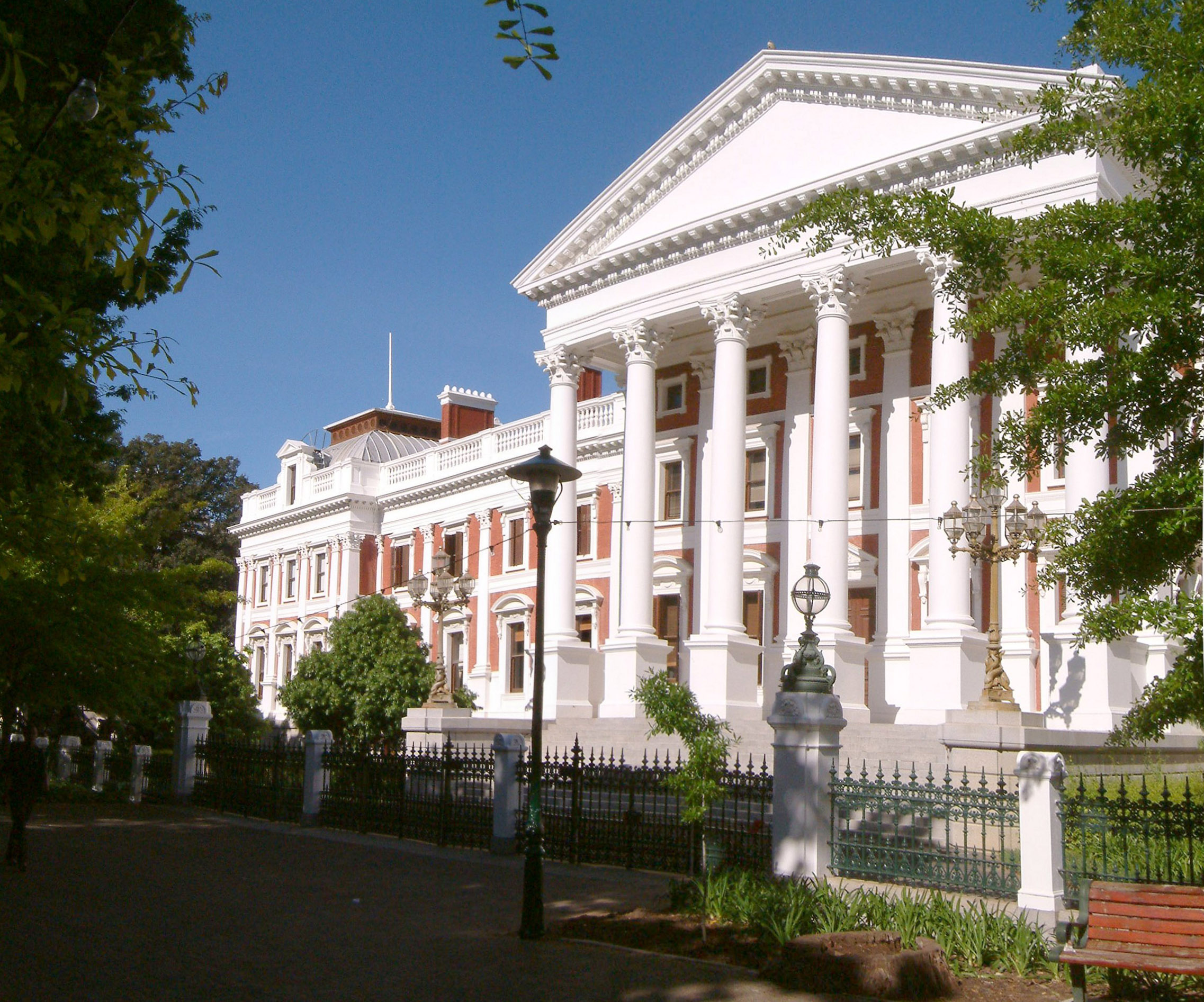
The Cape Parliament today, as the South African National Parliament.

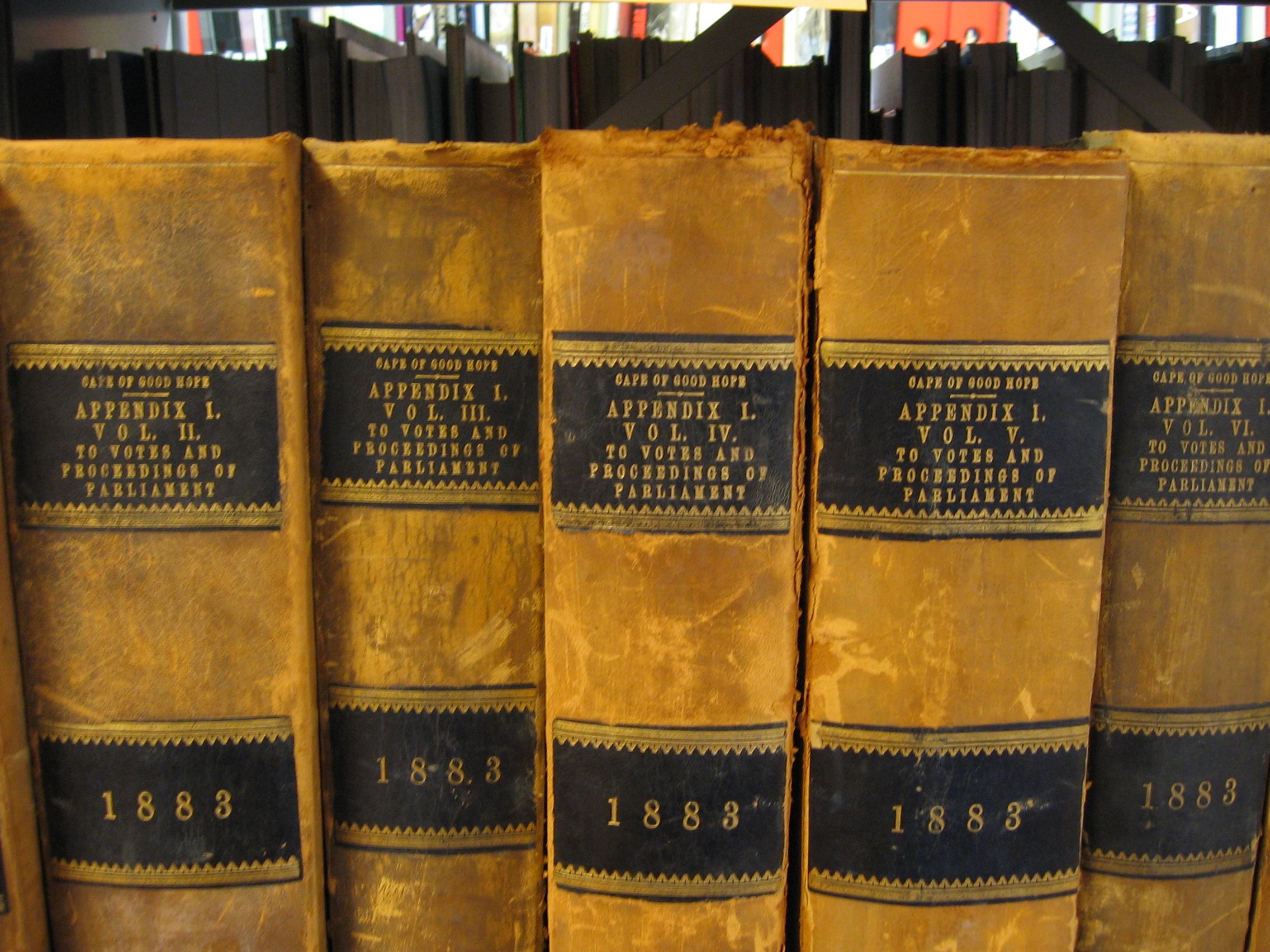
Five tomes of Appendix to Votes and Proceedings to Parliament, 1883

In the early twentieth century, following the tumults of the Second Boer War, the whole of southern Africa was finally under the control of the British Empire. The union of the various component states of the region was again discussed. Several previous attempts at union had failed, but in 1909 a National Convention was instituted in Cape Town, to unite the Cape of Good Hope with Natal, the Transvaal, and the Orange River Colony, to form a united country of "South Africa". The Convention met in the Cape Assembly's chamber of the Cape Parliament building, and it was here that the new constitution for South Africa was drawn up.

The Union of South Africa was proclaimed the following year, in 1910, and the old Cape Parliamentary building became the home of the new Parliament of South Africa. The provincial government of the Cape, now the Cape Province, was set up in a new building nearby, the Pronvisiale-gebou.

== Parliaments & Ministries of the Cape of Good Hope ==
=== Inaugural Parliament (1854) ===
1854 Inaugural Council (Upper house)
- Western Province:
  - Howson Edward Rutherfoord
  - Francis William Reitz, Sr.
  - Joseph Barry
  - Johan Hendrik Wicht
  - John Bardwell Ebden
  - Dirk Gysbert van Breda
  - Johannes de Wet LLD
  - Henry Thomas Vigne
- Eastern Province:
  - Andries Stockenström
  - Robert Godlonton
  - George Wood
  - Henry Blaine
  - Willem Simon Gregorius Metelerkamp
  - William Fleming
  - Gideon Daniel Joubert
1854 Inaugural Assembly (Lower house)
- Western Province Districts:
  - Hercules Crosse Jarvis, Cape Town
  - Saul Solomon, Cape Town
  - James Abercrombie MD, Cape Town
  - Francois Louis Charl Biccard MD, Cape Town
  - James Mortimer Maynard, Cape Division (southern Cape Peninsula)
  - Thomas Watson, Cape Division
  - Petrus Jacobus Bosman, Stellenbosch
  - Christoffel Brand LLD, Stellenbosch
  - Pieter Frederik Ryk de Villiers, Paarl
  - Johan Georg Steytler, Paarl
  - Frederick Duckitt, Malmesbury
  - Hugo Hendrick Loedolff, Malmesbury
  - Bryan Henry Darnell, Caledon
  - Charles Aiken Fairbridge, Caledon
  - Augustus Joseph Tancred DD, Clanwilliam
  - Johannes Hendricus Brand LLD, Clanwilliam
  - Egidius Benedictus Watermeyer LLD, Worcester
  - John Percival Wiggins, Worcester
  - John Molteno, Beaufort
  - James Christie, Beaufort
  - John Fairbairn, Swellendam
  - John Barry, Swellendam
  - Henry William Laws, George
  - Frans Adriaan Swemmer, George
- Eastern Province Districts:
  - James Thackwray, Grahamstown
  - Charles Pote, Grahamstown
  - Thomas Holden Bowker, Albany
  - William Cock, Albany
  - Johannes Christoffel Krog, Uitenhage
  - Stephanus Johannes Hartman, Uitenhage
  - John Paterson, Port Elizabeth
  - Henry Fancourt White, Port Elizabeth
  - Robert Mitford Bowker, Somerset East
  - Ralph Henry Arderne, Somerset East
  - Jeremias Frederik Ziervogel, Graaff-Reinet
  - Thomas Nicolaas German Muller, Graaff-Reinet
  - Charles Lennox Stretch, Fort Beaufort
  - Richard Joseph Painter, Fort Beaufort
  - John George Franklin, Victoria East
  - James Stewart, Victoria East
  - Johannes Petrus Vorster, Albert
  - Jacobus Johannes Meintjes, Albert
  - James Collett, Cradock
  - William Thornhill Gilfillan, radock
  - Johan Georg Sieberhagen, Colesberg
  - Ludwig Johan Frederik von Maltitz, Colesberg

=== Parliaments of the Cape (1854–1910) ===
- 1st Cape Parliament (1854–1858)
- 2nd Cape Parliament (1859–1863)
- 3rd Cape Parliament (1864–1869) – ended by dissolution by the Cape Colony Governor
- 4th Cape Parliament (1870–1873)
- 5th Cape Parliament (1874–1878)
- 6th Cape Parliament (1879–1883)
- 7th Cape Parliament (1884–1888)
- 8th Cape Parliament (1889–1893)
- 9th Cape Parliament (1894–1898) – ended by unsuccessful appeal to country by Prime Minister Sprigg
- 10th Cape Parliament (1898–1903) – ended by unsuccessful appeal to country by Prime Minister Sprigg
- 11th Cape Parliament (1904–1907) – ended by unsuccessful appeal to country by Prime Minister Jameson
- 12th Cape Parliament (1908–1910) – ended by the act of Union (31 May 1910)

=== Speakers of the Cape Parliament (1854–1910) ===
- Sir Christoffel Brand (1854–1873)
- Sir David Tennant (1874–1895)
- Sir Henry Juta (1896–1898)
- Sir Bisset Berry (1899–1907)
- Sir James Molteno (1908–1910)

=== Ministries of the Cape of Good Hope (1872–1910) ===
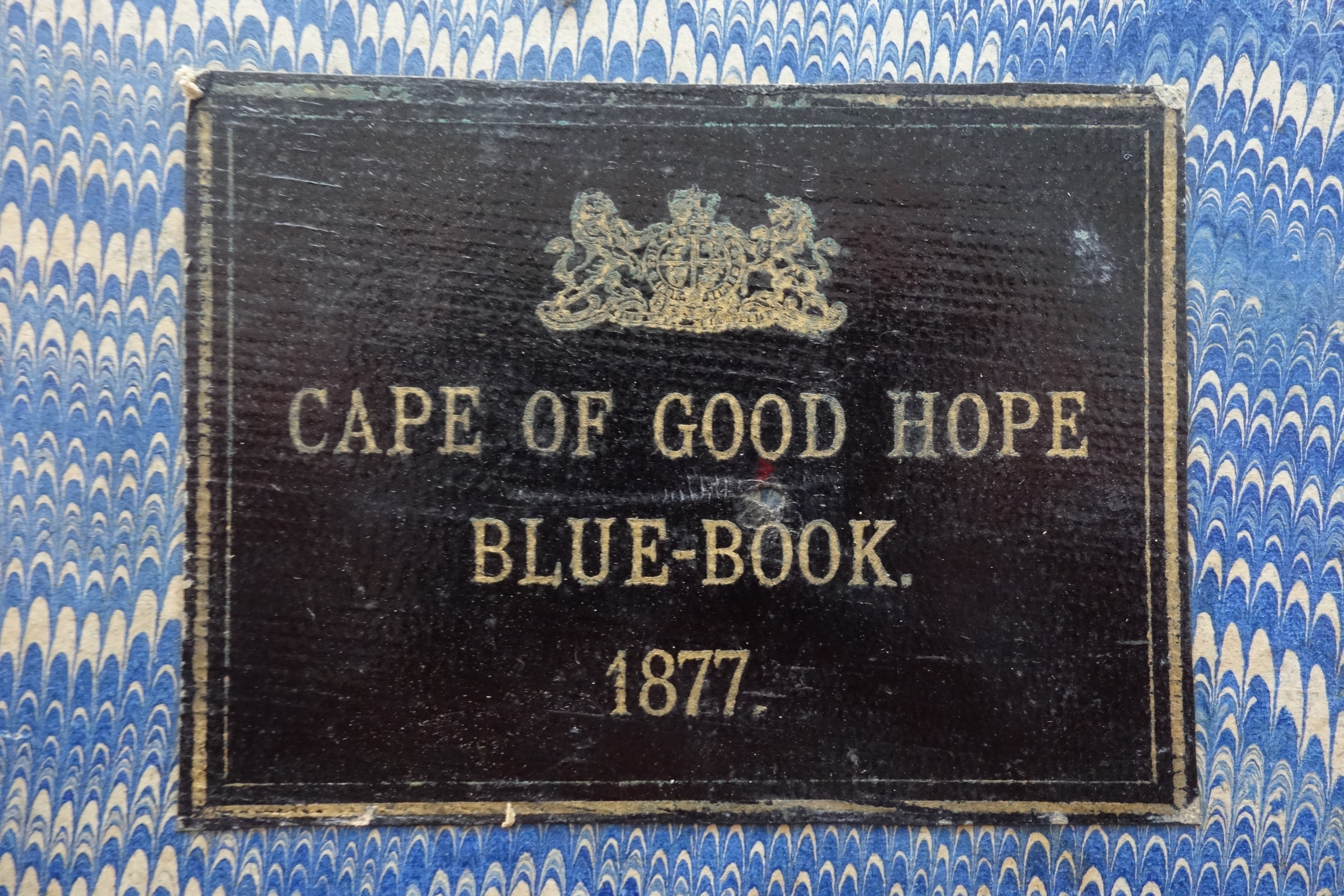
Parliament of the Cape of Good Hope, Blue Book 1877

The parliament's executive governments ("Ministries") dated only from 1872, when the Cape first attained responsible government. Prior to that parliament worked under a Governor, who was appointed by the Colonial Office in London.

No.	Name	Party	Assumed office	Left office
1	Sir John Charles Molteno	Independent	1 December 1872	5 February 1878
2	Sir John Gordon Sprigg	Independent	6 February 1878	8 May 1881
3	Thomas Charles Scanlen	Independent	9 May 1881	12 May 1884
4	Thomas Upington	Independent	13 May 1884	24 November 1886
—	Sir John Gordon Sprigg (2nd time)	Independent	25 November 1886	16 July 1890
5	Cecil Rhodes	Independent	17 July 1890	3 May 1893
—	Cecil Rhodes (2nd time)	Independent	4 May 1893	12 January 1896
—	Sir John Gordon Sprigg (3rd time)	Independent	13 January 1896	13 October 1898
6	William Philip Schreiner	Independent	13 October 1898	17 June 1900
—	Sir John Gordon Sprigg (4th time)	Progressive Party	18 June 1900	21 February 1904
7	Leander Starr Jameson	Progressive Party	22 February 1904	2 February 1908
8	John Xavier Merriman	South African Party	3 February 1908	31 May 1910

The post of prime minister of the Cape Colony also became extinct on 31 May 1910, when it joined the Union of South Africa.

=== Political parties ===
==== Early informal groupings (1854–1881) ====
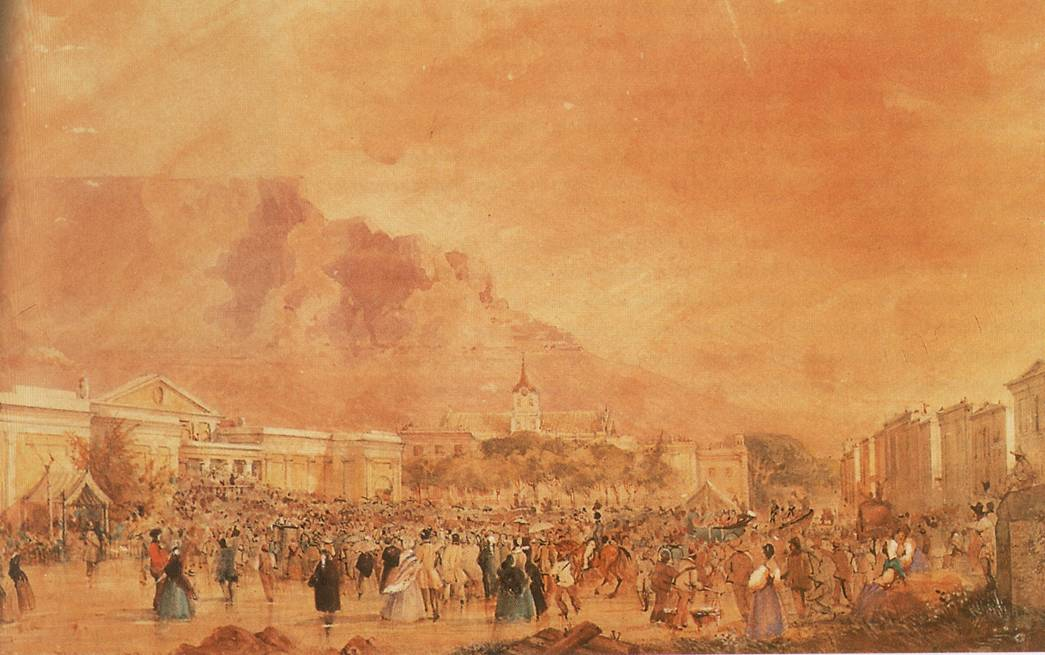
The mid-19th century Convict Crisis was a question which created a (temporary) political grouping, even before the establishment of the Cape's first parliament in 1854.

For much of the Cape's history, the parliament operated without formal political parties. Instead, parliamentarians aligned temporarily – according to specific issues. Nonetheless, informal alliances began to form according to the constituencies' overall attitude to long-standing issues, such as Responsible Government, the multi-racial franchise, territorial expansion, separatism and relations with the British government.

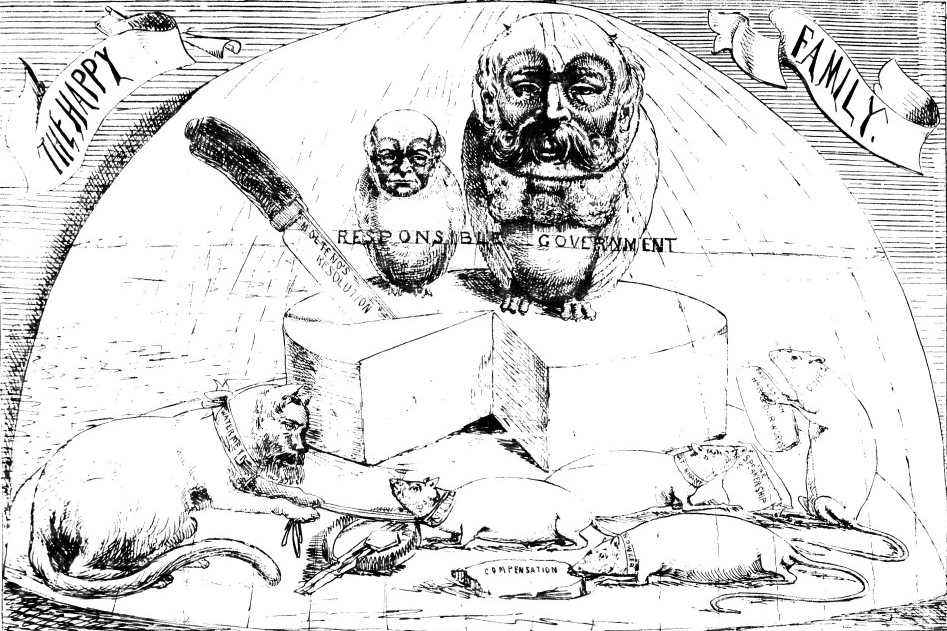
1873 cartoon critical of Responsible Government, showing the sharing out of power and positions to the various factions.

In the 1860s and early 70s, an alliance of parliamentarians came together in support of "Responsible Government". These parliamentarians were general opposed to continued imperial control, desired greater local independence; sought a greater focus on internal development rather than expanding the colony's boundaries; and professed a strong commitment to racial and regional unity throughout the Cape. Prominent leaders were William Porter, Saul Solomon, John Molteno, Hercules Jarvis and Charles Lennox Stretch. This alliance later became known as the "Westerners" due to their headquarters in Cape Town, or by the nickname of the "responsibles". Opposing them were a group of parliamentarians representing mainly white settler constituencies in the Eastern Cape near the frontier. Close to the neighbouring Xhosa lands, these politicians represented their constituents' fears of the more numerous Xhosa. They tended to support the continued status of the Cape as a colony, stronger policies regarding border defence and increased expansion into the north to open up lands for white settlement. They resented the political dominance of the more "liberal" Westerners and saw the solution to be a separate white "Eastern Cape Colony" under direct imperial control, with Port Elizabeth as its capital. For much of this time they were led by the representative of Port Elizabeth, John Paterson. They were known as the "Easterners" or the "Separatist League".

This decades long struggle was brought to an end in 1872, with the apparent triumph of the liberal faction and the achievement of responsible government. The newly elected Molteno government then brought together a broad alliance, run on liberal principles but incorporating several easterners and support from the Cape's Afrikaner and Black communities. The new government's inclusive policies extinguished the separatist league, but the ideology and interests of the frontier settlers survived and resurfaced years later. In the Cape Times 1876-1910 history, the 1870s was referred to as last decade before the onset of formal party divisions: "But in the 1870s, there were still no clearly defined political parties in the Cape Parliament. Responsible government had been granted in 1872 and the first Prime Minister, J.C. Molteno, was still in office. Saul Solomon, in spite of his diminutive size and physical handicap, was at the height of his powers and was probably the outstanding figure in the House, noted for his outspoken liberalism and his concern for the interests of Africans."

==== Rise of political parties (1881–1910) ====
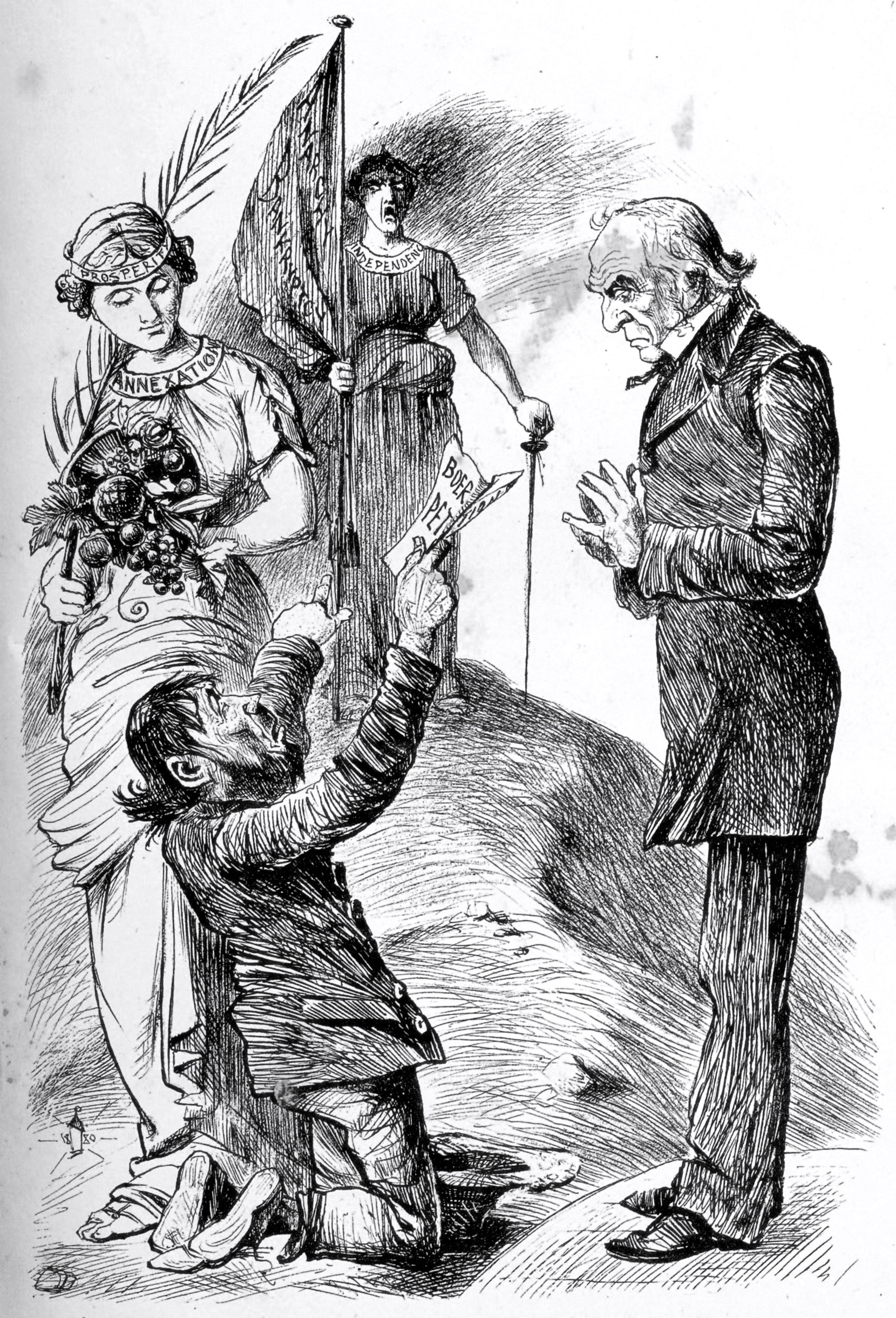
1880 cartoon criticising the Afrikaners for preferring the "chaos" of independence, over the "prosperity" of being annexed and coming under direct imperial control.

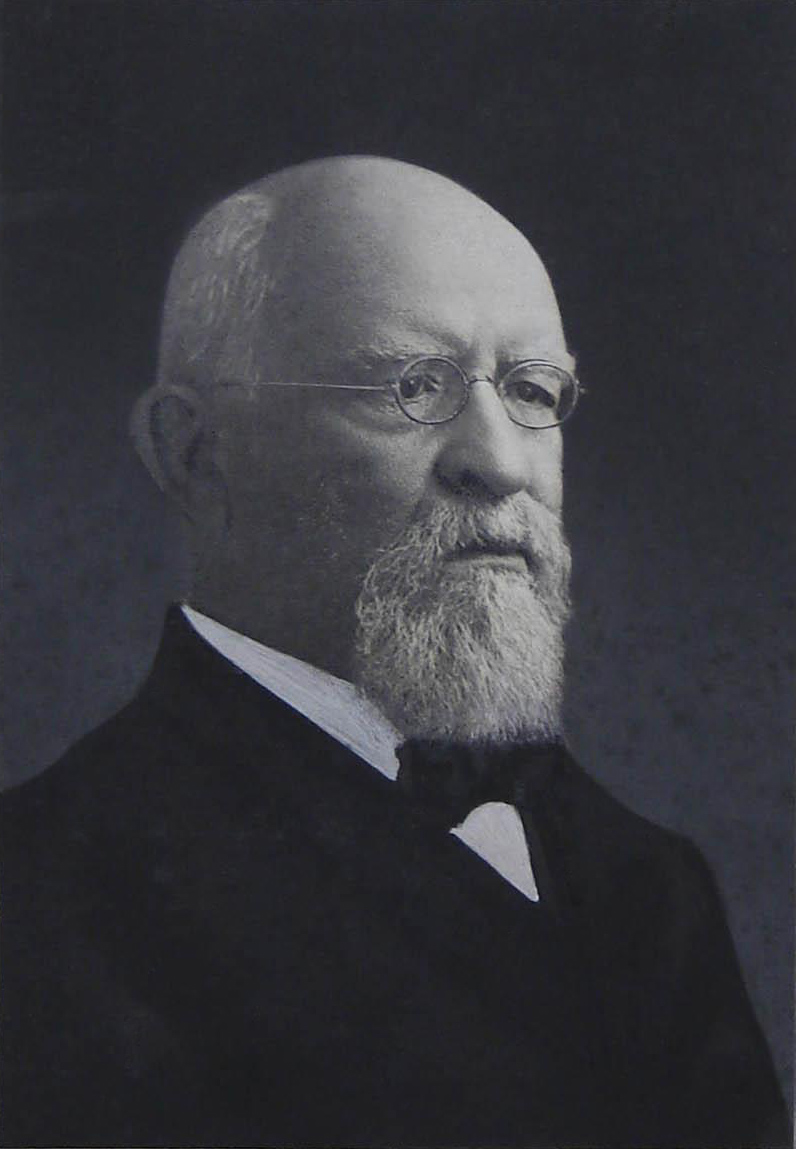
Jan Hendrik Hofmeyr (Onze Jan), long-term leader of the Afrikaner Bond.

Two key events contributed to the rise of political parties. The first was the 1878 annexation of the Transvaal and the ensuing First Boer War. After dismissing the Transvaal government, the Cape Colony Governor installed a former separatist, John Gordon Sprigg, as the new Prime Minister, with instructions to implement the Colonial Office's policies. Sprigg formed a cabinet composed entirely of Eastern frontier white settlers, but contributed to a new pro-imperialist ideology that was not tied to any particular region of the Cape, or indeed, of southern Africa. The attempted annexations of the Boer republics and perceptions of exclusion in the Cape Colony caused growing resentment in the Afrikaner or "Cape Dutch" population.

This led to the second key event, which was the founding of the Afrikaner Bond in 1881. The Afrikaner Bond was the Cape's first formal political party, headed by Jan Hendrik Hofmeyr (Onze Jan), and taking a strong stance for Afrikaner rights and (increasingly) against the political empowerment of the Cape's black citizens. The formation of the Bond severely weakened the liberal "Westerners" by splitting this bloc, and beginning their decline. The resulting three parties aligned differently according to the predominant issues of the day, with the Afrikaner Bond playing a central role as "King-maker": The liberals and the Bond agreed on the need to minimise imperial intervention in southern Africa, while the pro-imperialists and the Bond agreed on further restricting the rights of the Cape's black citizens.

The pro-imperialist grouping was by now known as "Progressives", and this movement reached the height of its power under Prime Minister Cecil Rhodes. Rhodes's orchestration of the Jameson Raid sharply polarised the Cape's politics to an unprecedented degree.

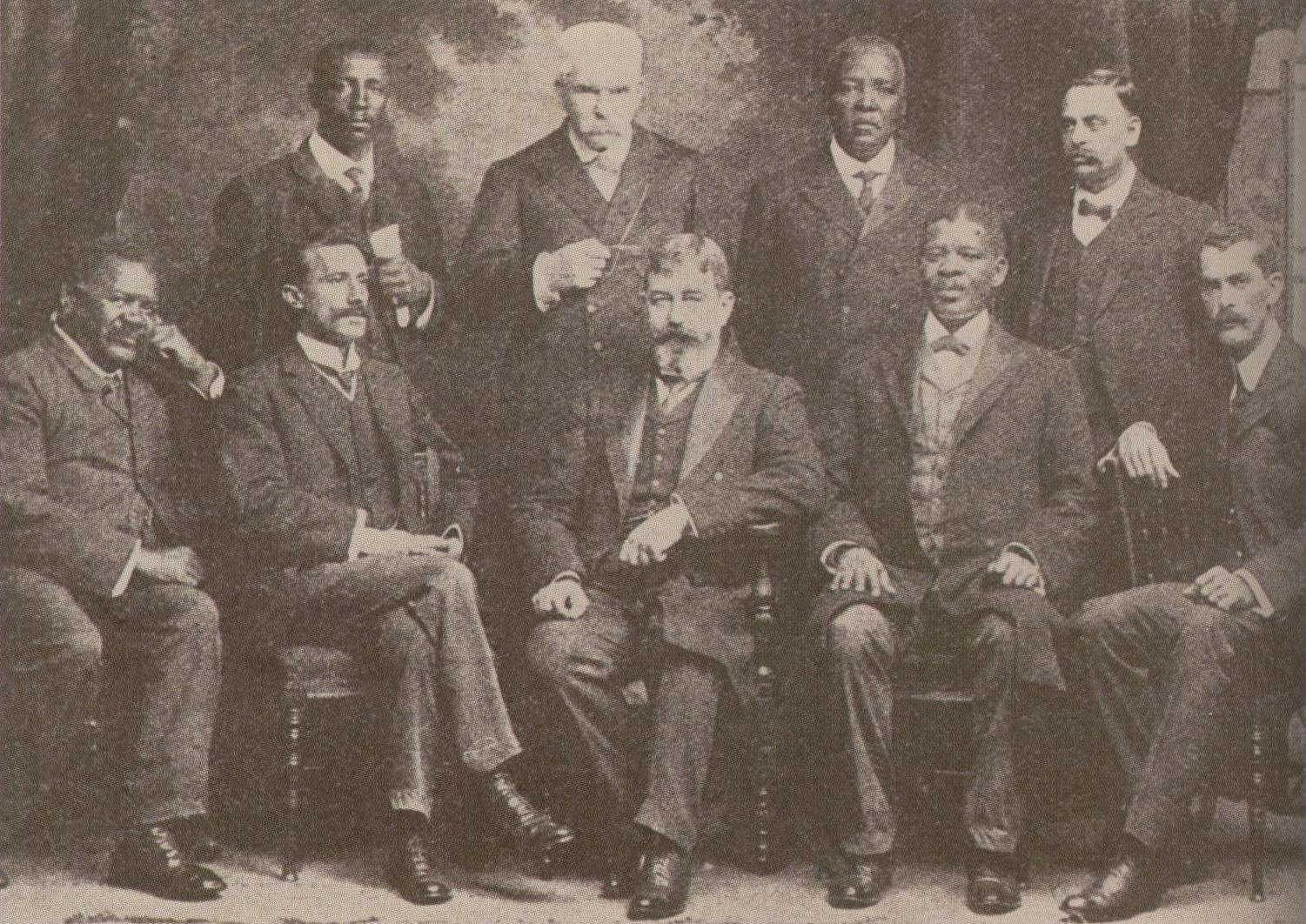
William Schreiner (centre, seated) with South African Party leaders, and activists, including John Tengo Jabavu, Walter Rubusana and Abdurahman in the delegation which lobbied the London Convention on Union for the multi-racial franchise.

The remaining liberal "westerners" formed the "South African Party" but were too weak to oppose Rhodes's Progressives alone, and so allied with the Afrikaner Bond to fight Rhodes's dominance. This controversial alliance with the racist Bond caused many of the South African Party's black voters to abandon it. It came to power briefly under its liberal leader William Schreiner but overall the ensuing decades were dominated by the Progressive Party. In 1908, John X Merriman finally led the South African Party to electoral victory, a mere two years before the Union of South Africa was formed in 1910.

==== Political parties after Union (1910) ====
After Union, the South African Party merged with the Afrikaner Bond, Het Volk of the Transvaal and Orangia Unie of the Orange River Colony, to form a new Union-wide South African Party. After this merger, the policies of the larger Afrikaner parties came to predominate and the distinctive liberalness of the original South African Party was subsumed, as South Africa began its long slide into Apartheid. Meanwhile, the Progressives (renamed the "Union Party of the Cape") merged with the Progressive Association of the Transvaal and the Constitutional Party of the Orange Free State to form the Unionist Party. The Democratic Alliance traces its origins to these parties through numerous successors.

== Notable people ==
- James Murison (c. 1816 - 1885), member of the Legislative Council
- Theophilus Lyndall Schreiner (1844-1920), elected to the Cape House of Assembly for the Progressive party in 1904

== See also ==
- Afrikaner Bond
- Progressive Party (Cape Colony)
- South African Party (Cape Colony)
- List of prime ministers of the Cape of Good Hope

== Sources ==
- Kilpin, Ralph (1918). The Old Cape House: Being Pages From The History of a Legislative Assembly. T. M. Miller.
- McCracken, J. L. (1967). The Cape Parliament, 1854–1910. Oxford University Press.
- Smith, Alan John Charrington (April 1980). General Elections in the Cape Colony, 1898–1908 (Thesis). University of Cape Town.
