= Augustus Joseph Tancred =

Founding member of the Cape Legislative Assembly

Augustus Joseph Tancred (30 August 1804 – 4 January 1867) was a founding member of the Cape Legislative Assembly.

== Early life and immigration ==
Born in Cork, Ireland, as Augustin Joseph Tancred, he did his doctorate in divinities (DD) and preached at several locations around the United Kingdom as a curate. He married Ms Mary Theresa Evelina Lattey, and they immigrated to the Cape Colony with their three sons in 1842. His first wife died on 20 March 1847. On 22 December 1853 in Clanwilliam he remarried, to Ms Geesje/Geesie Martha Maria van Zyl.

== Cape Parliament ==
The Cape Colony attained its first parliament in 1854. Dr Tancred stood for election as MLA for Clanwilliam and was elected.

He served from 1854 until 1858. Later he served again for a year from 1862 until 1863. He was briefly elected to represent Piquetberg too in 1866. He died in January the next year, though, in Cape Town in 1867.

He was notable for being one of the minority of MPs who supported the separatist movement of the Eastern Province (even though he represented a constituency in the Western Province).

He was also renowned for his alcoholism and raucous antics in parliament. On several occasions he was forcefully removed from the building for disruptive behaviour or drunkenness, and was also the cause of the Sergeant-at-Arms being called. At one point, he challenged the MP Jeremias Ziervogel to a duel in parliament, when his interruption of the elderly Ziervogel's speech got a verbal put-down.
