= Charles Aken Fairbridge =

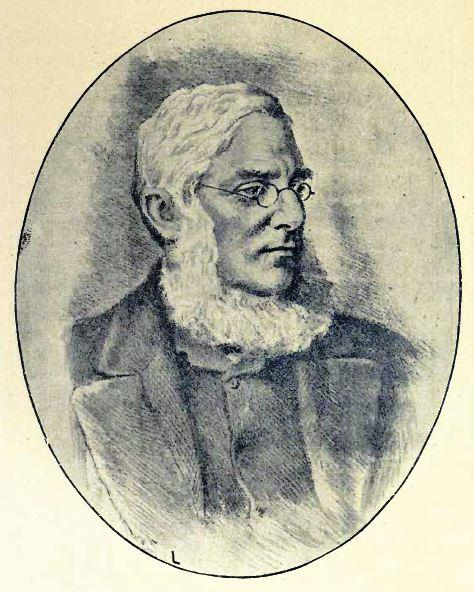
- Charles A Fairbridge, a portrait
- Born: 1824; Wynberg, Cape Town
- Died: 4 July 1893 (aged 68–69); Tenerife, Canary Islands
- Occupations: Book collector; Parliament; Lawyer

Charles Aken Fairbridge (1824–1893) was a Cape Colony book collector and a conservative member of the Parliament of the Cape of Good Hope.

== Early life ==
Fairbridge was born in Cape Town, the son of recent and relatively affluent British settlers. His father was a district surgeon, based in Uitenhage where Charles Aken grew up. In 1837, he was sent by his parents to England to finish his education. Upon his return to the Cape, he became a partner in the law firm Fairbridge, Arderne, and Lawton, with a particular focus on maritime law.

He married Sarah R. Anderson, the daughter of William George Anderson, one of the original directors of Old Mutual; in 1862 they settled in Sea Point, Cape Town.

== Political career ==
Fairbridge had entered the first Cape Parliament in 1854, representing Caledon District until 1858.

He was involved in the establishment of the national museum. In 1874 he was requested to redesign the arms of the Cape Colony and produced the emblem that was used by the Cape Province up until the late 20th century.

In 1874 he also returned to Parliament, this time as one of the members representing Cape Town. He was a strong opponent of the attempts by Lord Carnarvon in the late 1870s to enforce a British confederation on southern Africa.

== Bibliophile ==
He was chiefly known as a book collector though, with an enormous library of considerable value. It was later donated to the South African Library.

Fairbridge died on 4 July 1893, after returning from a holiday in Tenerife.
