= James Mortimer Maynard =

Politician and businessman

James Mortimer Maynard (30 August 1804 – 9 September 1874) was an influential money-lender and businessman of the Cape Colony, and a founding Member of the Cape Legislative Assembly, where he was elected to represent the Cape Division (southern Cape Peninsula) constituency.

== Money-lender and Landlord ==
James Maynard was the son of Levi and Sarah Maynard, staunch Wesleyan settlers from Huntingdonshire, who arrived in the Cape in 1820. He inherited substantial wealth and settled in the suburb of Wynberg, Cape Town, as an influential money lender. He invested his profits mainly in land, and became one of Cape Town's most powerful landlords.

== Politician ==
His growing economic and political influence in the region then known as the Cape Division (southern Cape Peninsula) helped him to get elected to represent it in the first Cape Parliament in 1854. However he was not a successful or popular representative.

== Maynardville estate ==
Maynardville, the well-known public park and open-air theatre in Cape Town, was originally one of Maynard's properties. He had taken it over from one of his insolvent debtors, a widow named Ellert, in 1838. He then bought the other portion of this "Rozendal" property from the same woman, and combined them to establish the estate which he named "Maynard's Villa."

Maynard had a deep interest in the Emperor Napoleon, and went to great lengths to acquire artifacts from Napoleon's St Helena tomb. He purchased the tomb gates, to install for his estate's driveway. He also acquired cuttings of the trees that grew around Napoleon's tomb, to cultivate as groves around his estate.

After his death, this "Maynardville" estate was taken over by his nephew, William Mortimer Maynard Farmer, who became a wealthy businessman just like his uncle. The house was enlarged for elaborate functions and entertaining guests, and Farmer likewise secured political office at one point, winning the Wynberg seat in the Cape Parliament (1879-1883). The Maynardville property remained in Farmer's family until his grandson Gerald sold it to the Cape Town City Council in 1949. The dilapidated house remained empty, but the grounds of the estate were declared a public open space.

In 1950, an open-air theatre was established on the property, by a small committee of women from the Cape Flats suburb of Athlone. It first put on dance productions to raise money for underprivileged schools. From 1956 the theatre also began productions of Shakespearean plays, and the Maynardville Open-Air Theatre has grown into a major institution of Cape Town.

== Personal life ==
Maynard only married relatively late in life, to Sarah Ann (Anna Sarah) Lewin, and the couple had no children. Outside of the large bequeaths he made to the Methodist church, his properties were mostly inherited by his nearest living relative, his nephew William Mortimer Maynard Farmer.
