= Henry Fancourt White =

South African road engineer

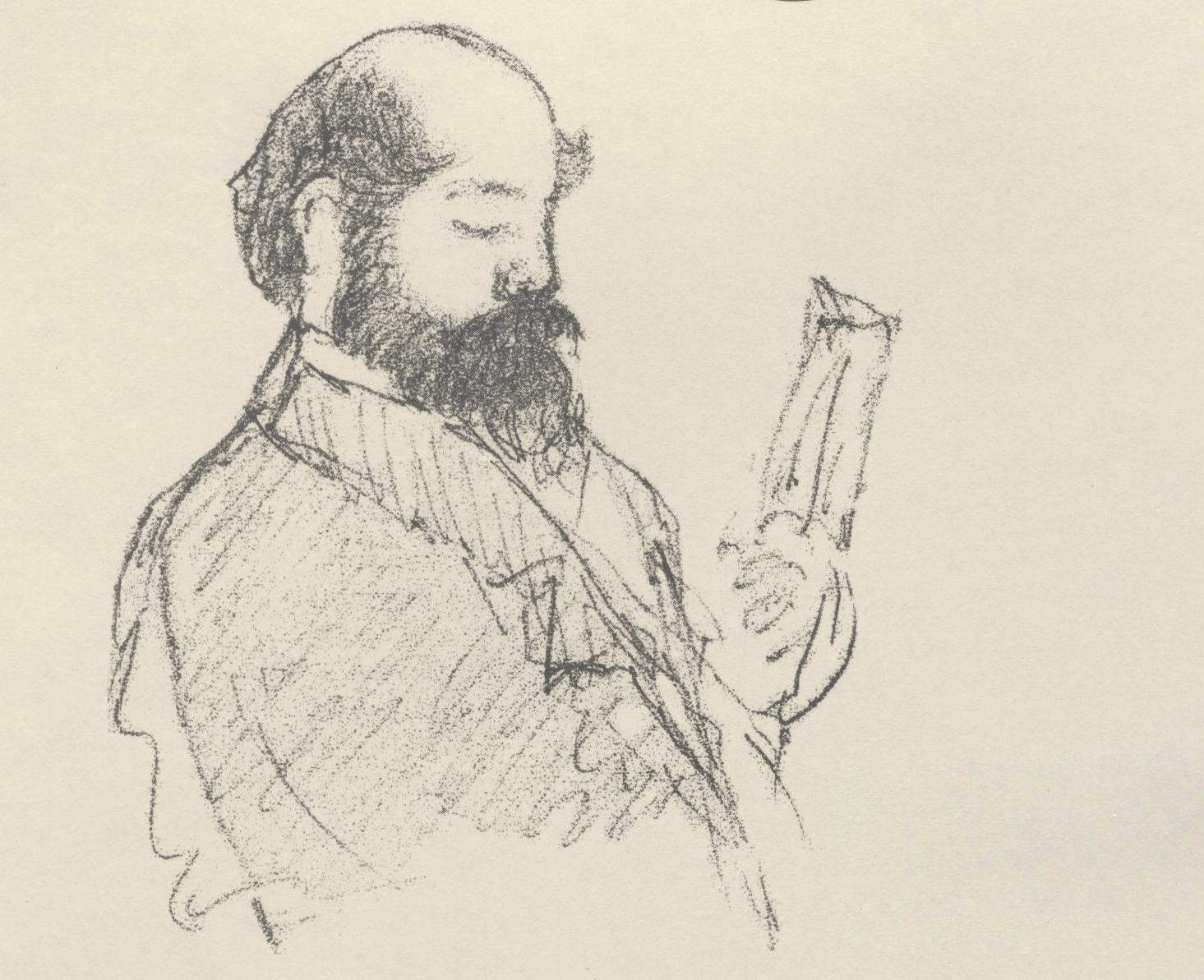
Sketch of John Molteno by Henry F White

Henry Fancourt White (25 May 1811 – 6 October 1866) was a British-born assistant surveyor in Cape Colony who played a part in construction of the Montagu Pass between George and Oudtshoorn, over the Outeniqua Mountains.

== South Africa, 1820–1836 ==
He was born in Yorkshire in 1811 and emigrated to the Cape Colony with his parents as 1820 Settlers. They were allocated land at Riviersonderend near the mission station of Genadendal, but resettled at Assegaaibosch in the Langkloof. He left South Africa for Australia to acquire road-building experience.

== Australia, 1836–1843 ==
White was appointed assistant surveyor by the colonial government in New South Wales. He surveyed land at Emu Plains for a town after the convict farm closed in 1832. White arrived in Port Macquarie in August 1836, and is believed to have established the first vineyard in the Hastings River region of Australia in 1837. It was known as "Clifton", a name which has been retained for the area to this day, and was located on land purchased near Settlement Farm, a stone's throw from the Pacific Ocean.

As a surveyor, White was responsible for the siting of a new road from Port Macquarie westwards to the New England district, but in 1837, became involved in a dispute with the stipendiary magistrate, William Nairn Gray. White accused Gray of altering the line of a road that White had marked out, so as not to cross land owned by Major Archibald Clunes Innes, a wealthy landowner. Gray in turn accused White of using Government men and animals on his land at "Clifton". The acting governor, Colonel William Snodgrass, dismissed the charges against Grey as frivolous. An enquiry held in Port Macquarie in 1839 resulted in White's dismissal from government service. His efforts at rescinding this judgement were unsuccessful, despite an 1842 petition supporting him, being submitted by a large number of settlers. White sold his vineyard and some of the land to William Stokes in 1839.

== South Africa, 1843–1866 ==
In 1836, Charles Collier Michell, Surveyor-General of the Cape Colony, had reconnoitred Cradock Pass and had been horrified by its steep gradients and poor condition. In 1843, he proposed that convict labour be used to build a road along an entirely new route over the Outeniqua Mountains. In due course this was approved by the colonial secretary, John Montagu, and work was started in 1844, with H. O. Farrel as superintendent of the project. The work turned out to be beyond him, and in his place Montagu appointed White, a qualified surveyor, who had recently become Road Inspector. Some 250 convicts were used to carry out the demanding work of constructing the new road. The project was eventually completed after four years' work at a cost of £35,799 and opened to traffic in December 1847, with the ceremonial opening taking place on 19 January 1848, and John Montagu personally attending. Montagu Pass served as the main road over the Outeniquas for more than 100 years and it was only with the completion of the Outeniqua Pass in 1951 that this old pass became no more than a scenic route.

Montagu suggested that the tiny roadcamp and village that grew at the foot of the mountain be named "White's Village" in honour of Henry Fancourt White, but this was subsequently changed to "Blanco". "Blanco House", White's residence, was started in 1859, in the style of a Cotswold Mansion, but White suffered major financial setbacks in 1860, dying in 1866, and was buried in the grounds of St. Mark's Cathedral in George. His wife died shortly after and her grave is next to his. His son, Ernest Montagu White, bought back the property in 1903, and renamed the house "Fancourt" in memory of his father, and his grandmother's maiden name. He commissioned skilled craftsmen to refurbish the manor house, using yellowwood, stinkwood and blackwood to restore its former grace. Ernest, a philanthropist and successful businessman in his own right, funded the building of a road from George to Wilderness and stained glass windows in St Mark's Cathedral. He was to die tragically on 10 April 1916, together with his sister, after a meal of poisonous mushrooms. Today Fancourt is a provincial heritage site rand operates as a hotel and golfing estate.

White also engineered the road from George to Great Brak River, the mountain pass from Port Elizabeth over the Zuurberg Mountains, and Howieson's Poort pass just west of Grahamstown. A difference of opinion with fellow engineer Woodford Pilkington, son of the Colonial Engineer, led to his leaving the Roads Board in 1853, and entering politics. He briefly served as the member for Algoa Bay. White was elected to the Parliament of the Cape of Good Hope when it was first formed in 1854, in which, together with Jock Paterson, he represented Port Elizabeth. He did not serve for long, but was known for his characterful sketches of his fellow MPs.
