= Jeremias Ziervogel =

South African businessman and politician

Jeremias Frederik Ziervogel M.L.A. (26 April 1802 – 2 July 1883) was a founding member of the Cape Parliament, in which he represented Graaff-Reinet, and was prominent in fighting the Eastern Province Separatist League.

== Early life ==
Ziervogel was an orphan, born in Cape Town, and the third son of immigrant parents of Swedish extraction, Carl Ewald Ziervogel (1756-1803) and his second wife, Anna Maria Auret (1778-1806). Jeremias was raised by an aunt in Cape Town and, in spite of his Swedish ancestry, he came to consider himself an Afrikaner.

He was schooled at Tot Nut van het Algemeen before entering the civil service. He worked for a time as a translator and justice of the peace. He was later appointed civil commissioner for Somerset East and its resident magistrate.

== Family ==
In 1824, aged 21, he married the 15-year-old Anna Susanna Maré, and the couple had a total of 7 children. Their eldest son, Carl Frederick Ziervogel (1826–1896) was magistrate of the Zoutpansberg area in 1877. Gold was found on his farm Leeuwpoort, which became the location of the Boksburg mining area from 1886. While many of his family members moved to Boksburg (Ziervogel Gold Mining Company) Carl Frederick retired to Pretoria. His only child, Thomas Ritchie Ziervogel (1859–1937), became Master of the Masonic Lodge and Boksburg Mayor. Another of their sons, Jacobus Philipus Ziervogel, was the Justice of the Peace and Market Master at Boksburg. Their third son, Dr Jeremias Frederick Ziervogel (c.1835–1905), became the Boksburg District Surgeon and the first Master of the town's Masonic Lodge (1893–1895). Their daughter Anna Susanna Ziervogel (1832–1909) married Gottfried Andreas Watermeyer in 1850, and was the mother to Ben Watermeyer and Frank Watermeyer, the influential Cape MPs.

== Graaff-Reinet patriarch ==
Ziervogel left the civil service in 1842 and settled in Graaff-Reinet where he practiced as an attorney, managed a bank, and founded a business. In 1847 he purchased the old Drostdy (town-hall) building, which he faithfully restored as the current monument.

He went on to become the centre of Graaff-Reinet's public life for the next quarter of a century. His involvement included serving as Commandant of the Graaff-Reinet commando in the 7th Frontier war, Director of the town's bank, Chair of the board of executors, member of the divisional council, on the library committee, founding member of the town's college, first grand master of the Midland Lodge, chair of the town's municipal commissioners, leader of the town's anti-convict association in 1849, and Member of Parliament for the town from 1854 until his retirement from politics in 1873.

== Parliamentary career (1854–73) ==
He was elected to the Cape Parliament when it was established in 1854, and even drafted the original "Standing Rules and Orders" of the new parliament. His seat in the house famously necessitated a journey of 450 miles across the arid Karoo mountains, from Graaff-Reinet to Cape Town, for every parliamentary session.

Ziervogel was a vocal champion of the concerns of the Cape's Afrikaner population, to such an extent that some of the English-language press labelled him as "parliament's chief obstructionist". He was also a strong opponent of any further British imperial expansion in southern Africa. On one notorious occasion on 24 April 1856, his speech angered a pro-imperialist MP to such an extent that the MP in question, Reverend Dr Tancred, violently disrupted the parliament and challenged Ziervogel to a duel on the spot. Ziervogel abhorred violence and rejected the duel, but the incident nonetheless became famous.

Mr Ziervogel played a prominent role in fighting the 1870 move by Governor Philip Wodehouse to weaken and reduce the Cape parliament into a powerless council. After a long and bitter struggle the move was finally defeated, and the elderly Ziervogel reportedly ran out of parliament in delight and skipped through the streets "...like a young lamb".

He also played a very prominent role in fighting the radical "Eastern Cape Separatist League", although it was partially because he abhorred the idea of a division whereby Graaff-Reinet would be ruled by jingoistic Grahamstown. His half-hearted proposal of an alternative three-way division of the country got around this objection of his, but in fact, the separatist league was soon to be quashed.

From the early 1860s, he gave his full political influence in aid to the growing movement for "Responsible Government" in the Cape, becoming a fierce supporter of the movement's leader John Molteno. After a decade-long struggle, responsible government was attained in 1872, finally bringing the country's executive under local democratic control. However, Ziervogel opposed the closely allied "Voluntaryism" (separation of church & state) movement, led by Saul Solomon, in spite of it being almost indistinguishable from the responsible government party.

Ziervogel retired a few months after responsible government was attained, although he had been strongly favoured to be in Molteno's first cabinet. A farewell party was held in his honour by his parliamentary colleagues, and in his farewell speech he expressed contentment with the political state of the country and the hope that it would one day be united into a free "United States of Southern Africa".

The Graaff-Reinet Advertiser commented on his career:

All admired his shrewdness, knowledge and ability, but in some way he came to be looked on as some sort of mystery: no one could tell when he had spoken whether there was not as much kept back as had been uttered; and he never became the political leader his talent entitled him to become ... men could not follow a political sphinx.

== Later life ==
After leaving parliament, he immediately left the country and moved to Pretoria, in the Transvaal in 1873, where he established a branch of the Cape Commercial Bank and settled at "Oak Lodge" on Bosman Street. His sons and grandchildren accompanied him, and, through persistent and effective lobbying of the Transvaal government, they attained a range of influential appointments. Nonetheless, the emigration was an unexpected move for an elderly man so settled in Graaff-Reinet and central to its life. His motivations for this move are not fully known.

He died in Pretoria, aged 80, in 1883.
