= Charles Lennox Stretch =

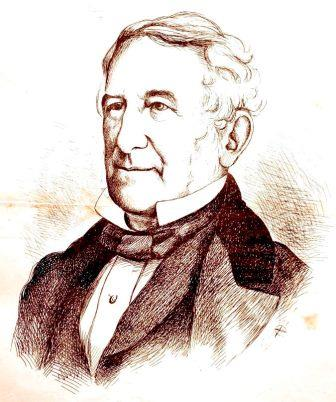
Charles Lennox Stretch. From a sketch in 1872

Charles Lennox Stretch MLC (6 May 1797 – 13 October 1882), known locally as "Xolilizwe" ("peacemaker"), was a humanitarian, philanthropist, and a prominent member of the Parliament of the Cape of Good Hope.

== Early life ==
Stretch was born in Bristol, England, in an old Irish family. He joined the army and was sent to southern Africa in 1818 as a captain in the 38th regiment. He was soon joined here by his brother and three sisters, who also settled in the Cape. In 1819 he served in the defense of Grahamstown before taking work as engineer and Governor Land Surveyor for Graaff-Reinet in 1823. With Andrew Geddes Bain, he helped to build the Oudeberg Pass in 1829 and the Van Ryneveld's Pass road in 1832.

In 1820 he married a local Cape-born woman, Anna Hart. The couple had a child, James St Ledger Stretch, who died shortly after birth, and the couple had no further children.

== Frontier years (1834–1854) ==
Stretch served in the 6th frontier war (1834–35). He was also influential in exposing the brutal execution of the Xhosa King Hintsa, at the hands of Governor Harry Smith and the Southey brothers.

In 1836 he was appointed as a diplomatic agent with the Xhosa "Gaika", Imidange and Amabele tribes. Stretch was a fervent supporter of the policies of Andries Stockenström, in bringing a degree of peace to the frontier and reining back white settlers from moving into Xhosa lands. Like Stockenström, he was an idealist who detested the injustices against the Xhosa, but was also an adept fighter who agreed to take up arms for the Cape when war did break out.

For much of his career, Stretch was involved in a long-running struggle against the influential missionary Henry Calderwood – a fierce imperialist who worked to evict the Xhosa from their lands. He was also deeply hated and distrusted by the imperial establishment and by the British settlers of the frontier.

With the outbreak of the 7th frontier war (1846–47), Stretch fought with a Fengu ("Fingo") division, but very quickly came to clash with the British authorities and was dismissed. After his dismissal he returned to being a government surveyor, based at his farm at Doorn Kloof, in the Mancazana valley. However he continued his activism unofficially, passing information on to his few remaining political allies in London and writing polemics against British frontier policies. His letters and writings are a valuable record of the Frontier Wars, and provide an important account from the pro-Xhosa perspective.

== Political career (1854–1873) ==
Stretch was elected as Member of the Assembly (lower house) of the Cape Parliament when it was first formed in 1854, representing Fort Beaufort on the frontier together with Richard Joseph Painter. He changed his constituency in 1859, when he represented Port Elizabeth in the same parliament. In 1868 he went on to serve in the Legislative Council (upper house) of the Cape Parliament, where he represented the Eastern Circle (Province).

Stretch was a strong supporter of the movement for "Responsible Government" (local democratic self-rule) – a movement which progressively grew through the 1850s and 60s, as frustration with British rule mounted. Most MPs from the eastern part of the Cape tended to oppose responsible government though, and Stretch was unusual in his support. He was one of only two "eastern" members of the Legislative Council to support it consistently, and his active persistent support was therefore crucial in finally getting it passed in 1872. He retired from politics in 1873.
