= John Bardwell Ebden =

Cape Colony businessman and politician

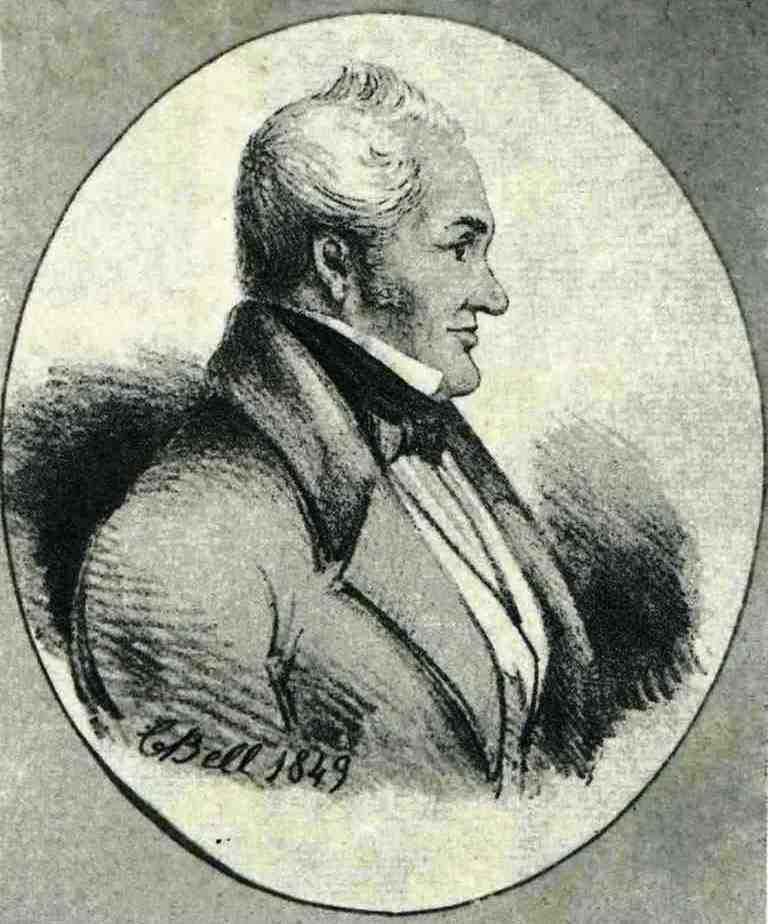
Sketch of JB Ebden from 1849.

John Bardwell Ebden M.L.C. (9 April 1787 – 22 September 1873) was a businessman and politician of the Cape Colony. He dominated Cape Town commerce for over sixty years in the 19th century, and was an unofficial member of the Cape Legislative Council.

An ambitious and combative personality, he was known by the nickname "the stormy petrel", due to his reputation of frequently being in fights.

== Early life ==
JB Ebden was born on 9 April, 1787 in Loddon, Norfolk, England, the son of John Ebden, an army surgeon, and Sarah Norman. He received little education, went to sea aged 16 in 1803, and traveled around the Torres Straits and China.

On a second voyage, this time destined for India, he was shipwrecked off Cape Town. The 18 year old JB swam ashore in Table Bay (supposedly with a bag of gold in his fist). He received permission to stay at the Cape Colony in October 1806, and began work as a clerk in the Royal Naval Victualling Office.

In 1808 he married Antoinetta Adriana Kirchmann, the daughter of an influential German immigrant businessman, and the couple had 12 children. He soon left his job and set up a wine merchant business, Ebden & Eaton. Richard Webber Eaton, his partner, was married to Ebden's sister Sarah Ebden in 1814.

He built Belmont (Now St Josephs College), Rondebosch, in 1836. This estate became his home and he lived there for the rest of his life.

== Business interests ==
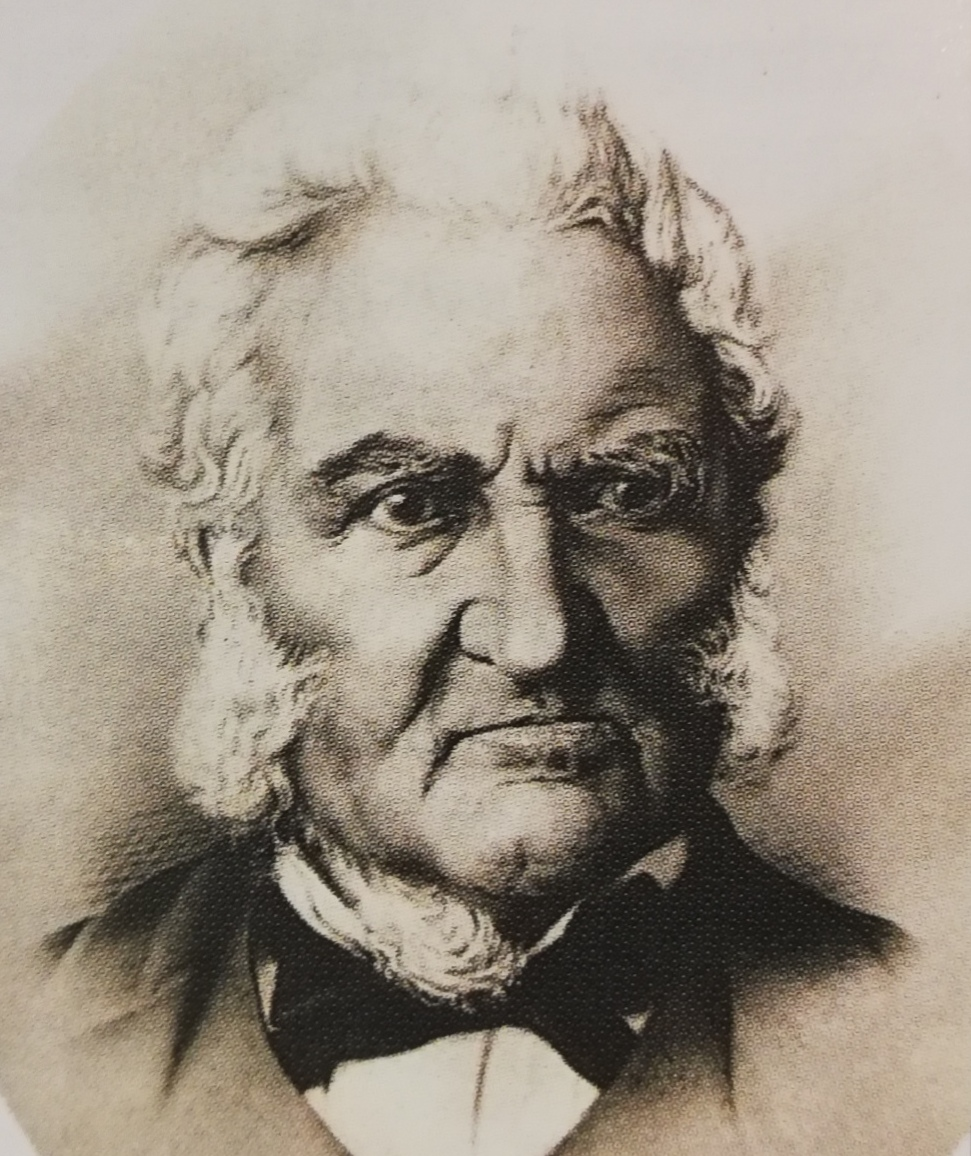
The "storm petrel", JB Ebden, in later life.

A man of unusual proactivity, ambition and business acumen, he fought his way to the top of the Cape commercial scene and went on to establish a variety of important enterprises. He founded the Cape of Good Hope Bank and Trade Society, he established the Cape's Commercial Exchange in 1817, he helped to set up the Cape's first insurance company, and he was an early pioneer in the Copperfields. He built up an export trading network with Europe, East Asia and St Helena.

In all of these enterprises, and others, he came to hold an increasingly dominant position, positions he held until his death. He was President of the CoGH Bank (1838–1873), Chair of the Commercial Exchange and President of the Chamber of Commerce (1861–1873).

Following emancipation of slaves in 1834, Ebden was compensated in 1836 to the value of £231 for four enslaved people in Cape of Good Hope.

The "JB Ebden Prize" and "JB Ebden Scholarships" became institutions in the Cape; the former won by J.H. Hofmeyr in 1916, and the latter which was founded by his son Judge John Watts EBDEN (1810 - 1886) enabled Jan Christiaan Smuts to graduate from Cambridge.

== Political involvement (1834-1858) ==
He soon became involved in Cape politics. In 1834 he became an unofficial member of the Cape's Legislative Council - a relatively powerless body that was nonetheless the closest that the Cape had to a legislature at the time. (However one of the junior clerks in his merchant house was a boy named John Molteno, an Anglo-Italian immigrant who went on to wrest self-government for the Cape and become its first Prime Minister.)

Ebden was one of the leaders of the renowned anti-convict movement, together with Cape Town Mayor Hercules Crosse Jarvis and Attorney General William Porter, even chairing it in 1849, when he abdicated his Legislative Council seat in protest.

When the Cape received an elected parliament in 1854, Ebden was elected to the Legislative Council (upper house) representing the Western Province. He held the seat until 1858.

== Later life ==
JB Ebden acquired the nickname "the Storm Petrel" due to his combative and independent nature, as well as his tendency to be found in the centre of agitations. He had famously acute business acumen, and entirely dominated the Cape's public sphere for several decades.

He died in 1873 and is buried in Cape Town at the Somerset Road Cemetery.
