= Cape Colony =

British colony from 1806 to 1910

Cape Colony Kaapkolonie (Dutch)
- 1806–1910
- Flag (1876–1910) Coat of arms
- Anthem: God Save the King (1795–1837; 1901–1910); God Save the Queen (1837–1901)
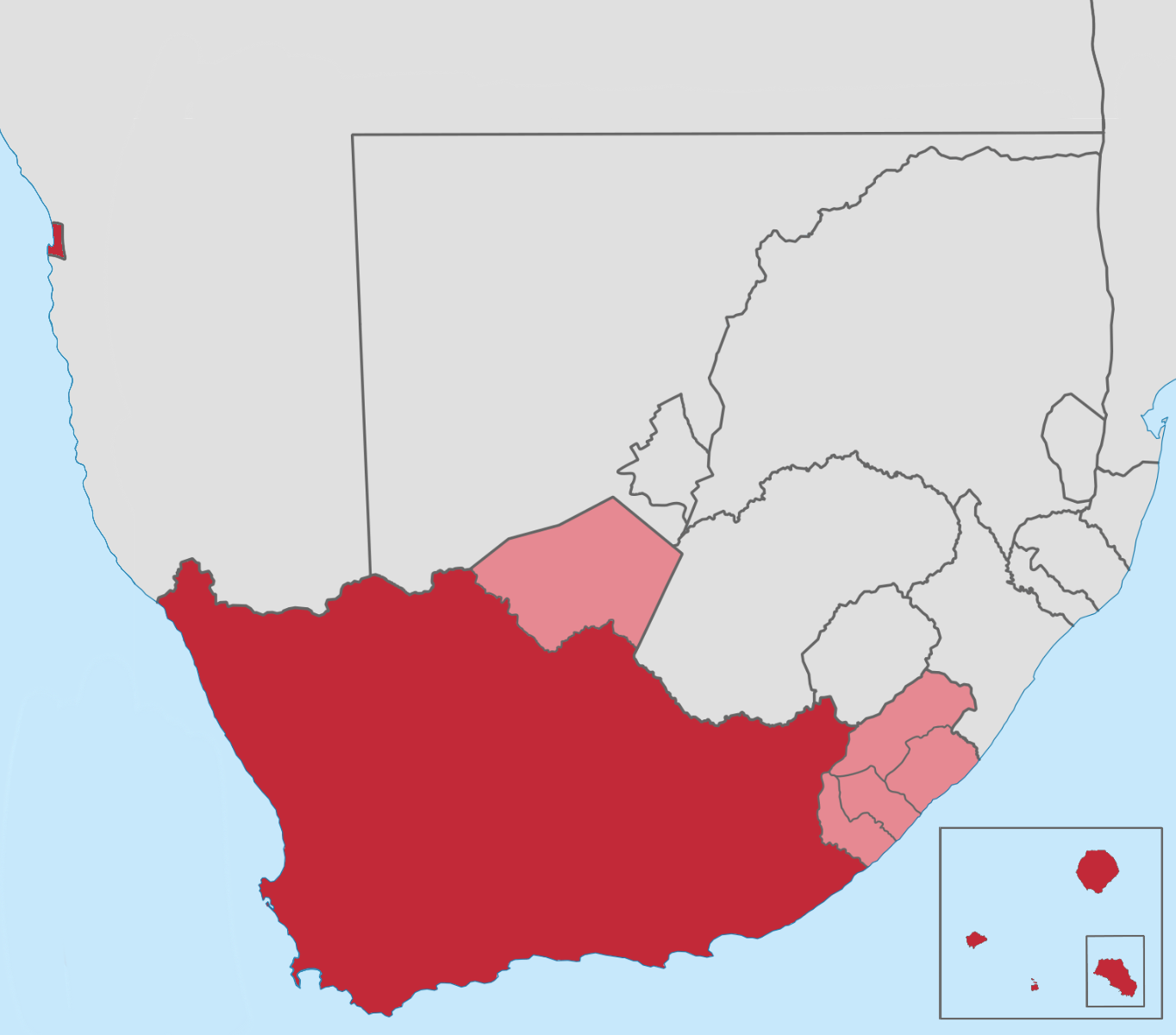
- The Cape Colony in 1885 shown in red.
- Status: Crown colony of the British Empire
- Capital: Cape Town
- Official languages: English; Dutch (Note: Dutch was the sole official language until 1822, when the British officially replaced Dutch with English. Dutch was reincluded as a second official language in 1882.)
- Common languages: Afrikaans, Khoekhoe, Xhosa also spoken
- Ethnic groups (1904): 59.12% Black; 24.05% White; 16.39% Coloured; 0.42% Asian
- Religion: Dutch Reformed Church, Anglican, San religion
- Government: Self-governing colony under Constitutional monarchy
- King/Queen
  - 1795–1820: George III
  - 1820–1830: George IV
  - 1830–1837: William IV
  - 1837–1901: Victoria
  - 1901–1910: Edward VII
- Governor
  - 1797–1798: George Macartney
  - 1901–1910: Walter Hely-Hutchinson
- Prime Minister
  - 1872–1878: John Charles Molteno
  - 1908–1910: John X. Merriman
- Legislature: Parliament
  - Upper house: Legislative Council
  - Lower house: House of Assembly
- Historical era: Imperialism
  - Dutch colony: 1803–1806
  - Occupied: 8 January 1806
  - Anglo-Dutch treaty: 1814
  - Administration of Natal: 1844
  - Basutoland incorporated into the Cape Colony: 3 November 1871
  - Basutoland separated to form its own colony: 2 February 1884
  - Merged into Union of South Africa: 31 May 1910

Area
- 1822: 331,907 km^{2} (128,150 sq mi)

Population
  - 1822: 110,380
  - 1865 census: 496,381
  - 1875 census: 720,984
  - 1891 census: 1,527,224
  - 1904 census: 2,409,804
- Currency: Pound sterling
Preceded by
Dutch Cape Colony
British Bechuanaland
Republic of Swellendam
Republic of Graaff-Reinet
Islands of Refreshment
Succeeded by
Union of South Africa
Basutoland
Tristan da Cunha
- Today part of: Namibia (Note: Penguin Islands and Walvis Bay); South Africa; Lesotho (Note: Basutoland was annexed to the Cape Colony in 1871, before becoming a Crown colony in 1884. See "Lesotho: History". The Commonwealth. Archived from the original on 1 November 2017.)

Map of the Cape of Good Hope in 1885 (blue). The areas of Griqualand West and Griqualand East were annexed to the Cape Colony around 1880.

The Cape Colony (Dutch: Kaapkolonie), also known as the Cape of Good Hope, was a British colony in present-day South Africa named after the Cape of Good Hope. It existed from 1795 to 1802, and again from 1806 to 1910, when it united with three other colonies to form the Union of South Africa, then became the Cape Province, which existed even after 1961, when South Africa had become a republic, albeit temporarily outside the Commonwealth of Nations (1961–94).

The British colony was preceded by an earlier corporate colony that became an original Dutch colony of the same name, which was established in 1652 by the Dutch East India Company (VOC). The Cape was under VOC rule from 1652 to 1795 and under rule of the Napoleonic Batavia Republic from 1803 to 1806. The VOC lost the colony to Great Britain following the 1795 Battle of Muizenberg, but it was ceded to the Batavia Republic following the 1802 Treaty of Amiens. It was re-occupied by the British following the Battle of Blaauwberg in 1806, and British possession was affirmed with the Anglo-Dutch Treaty of 1814. The Cape of Good Hope then remained in the British Empire, becoming self-governing in 1872.

The colony was coextensive with the later Cape Province, stretching from the Atlantic coast inland and eastward along the southern coast, constituting about half of modern South Africa: the final eastern boundary, after several wars against the Xhosa, stood at the Fish River. In the north, the Orange River, natively known as the ǂNūǃarib (Black River) and subsequently called the Gariep River, served as the boundary for some time, although some land between the river and the southern boundary of Botswana was later added to it. From 1878, the colony also included the enclave of Walvis Bay and the Penguin Islands, both in what is now Namibia.

It united with three other colonies to form the Union of South Africa in 1910, and was accordingly renamed the Province of the Cape of Good Hope. South Africa became a sovereign state in 1931 by the Statute of Westminster. In 1961, it became the Republic of South Africa. Following the 1994 creation of the present-day South African provinces, the Cape Province was partitioned into the Eastern Cape, Northern Cape, and Western Cape, with smaller parts in North West province.

== History ==
=== VOC settlement ===
An expedition of the VOC led by Jan van Riebeeck established a trading post and naval victualing station at the Cape of Good Hope in 1652. Van Riebeeck's objective was to secure a harbour of refuge for VOC ships during the long voyages between Europe and Asia. Within about three decades, the Cape had become home to a large community of vrijlieden, also known as vrijburgers ('free citizens'), former VOC employees who settled in the colonies overseas after completing their service contracts. Vrijburgers were mostly married citizens who undertook to spend at least twenty years farming the land within the fledgling colony's borders; in exchange they received tax exempt status and were loaned tools and seeds. Reflecting the multi-national nature of the early trading companies, the VOC granted vrijburger status to Dutch, Swiss, Scandinavian and German employees, among others. In 1688 they also sponsored the immigration of nearly two hundred French Huguenot refugees who had fled to the Netherlands upon the Edict of Fontainebleau. This so-called "Huguenot experiment" was deemed a failure by the colonial authorities a decade later, as many of the Huguenot arrivals had little experience with agriculture and had become a net burden on the colonial government. There was a degree of cultural assimilation due to Dutch cultural hegemony that included the almost universal adoption of the Dutch language.

Many of the colonists who settled directly on the frontier became increasingly independent and localised in their loyalties. Known as Boers, they migrated beyond the Cape Colony's initial borders and had soon penetrated almost a thousand kilometres inland. Some Boers even adopted a nomadic lifestyle permanently and were denoted as trekboers. The VOC colonial period had a number of bitter, genocidal conflicts between the colonists and the Khoe-speaking indigenes, followed by the Xhosa, both of which they perceived as unwanted competitors for prime farmland.

VOC traders imported thousands of slaves to the Cape of Good Hope from the Dutch East Indies and other parts of Africa. By the end of the eighteenth century the Cape's population swelled to about 26,000 people of European descent and 30,000 slaves.

=== British conquest ===
In 1795, France occupied the Seven Provinces of the Dutch Republic, the mother country of the Dutch United East India Company. This prompted Great Britain to occupy the Cape Colony in 1795 as a way to better control the seas in order to stop any potential French attempt to reach India. The British sent a fleet of nine warships which anchored at Simon's Town and, following the defeat of the VOC militia at the Battle of Muizenberg, took control of the territory. The United East India Company transferred its territories and claims to the Batavian Republic (the Revolutionary period Dutch state) in 1798, and went bankrupt in 1799. Improving relations between Britain and Napoleonic France, and its vassal state the Batavian Republic, led the British to hand the Cape of Good Hope over to the Batavian Republic in 1803, under the terms of the Treaty of Amiens.

In 1806, the Cape, now nominally controlled by the Batavian Republic, was occupied again by the British after their victory in the Battle of Blaauwberg. The temporary peace between the UK and Napoleonic France had crumbled into open hostilities, whilst Napoleon had been strengthening his influence on the Batavian Republic (which Napoleon would subsequently abolish and directly administer later the same year). The British, who set up a colony on 8 January 1806, hoped to keep Napoleon out of the Cape, and to control the Far East trade routes.

The Cape Colony at the time of British occupation was three months' sailing distance from London. The White colonial population was small, no more than 25,000 in all, scattered across a territory of 100,000 square miles. Most lived in Cape Town and the surrounding farming districts of the Boland, an area favoured with rich soils, a Mediterranean Climate and reliable rainfall. Cape Town had a population of 16,000 people. In 1814 the Dutch government formally ceded sovereignty over the Cape to the British, under the terms of the Convention of London.

=== British colonisation ===
The British started to settle the eastern border of the Cape Colony, with the arrival in Port Elizabeth of the 1820 Settlers. They also began to introduce the first rudimentary rights for the Cape's Black African population and, in 1834, abolished slavery; however, the government proved unable to rein in settler violence against the San, which continued largely unabated as it had during the Dutch period. The resentment that the Boers felt against this social change, as well as the imposition of English language and culture, caused them to trek inland en masse. This was known as the Great Trek, and the migrating Boers settled inland, eventually forming the Boer Republics.

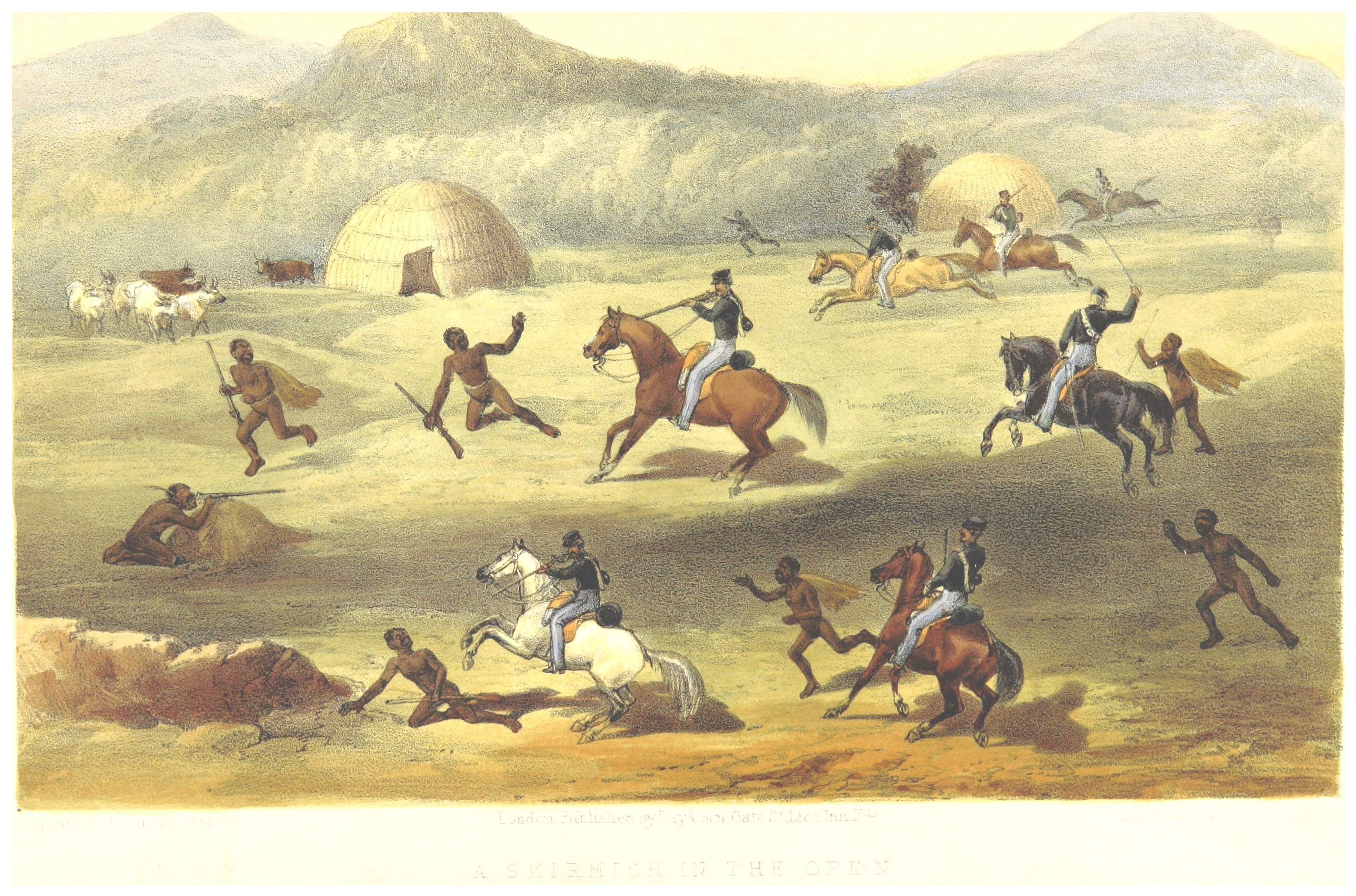
Skirmish during the Xhosa Wars

British Immigration continued in the Cape, even as many of the Boers continued to trek inland, and the ending of the British East India Company's monopoly on trade led to economic growth.

At the same time, the long series of Xhosa Wars fought between the Xhosa people in the east and the government of the Cape Colony as well as Boer settlers finally died down when the Xhosa took part in a mass destruction of their own crops and cattle, in the belief that this would cause their ancestors to wake from the dead. The resulting famine crippled Xhosa country and ushered in a long period of stability on the border.

Peace and prosperity, in addition to the Convict crisis of 1849, led to a desire for political independence. In 1853, the Cape Colony became a British Crown colony with representative government. In 1854, the Cape of Good Hope elected its first parliament, on the basis of the multi-racial Cape Qualified Franchise. Cape residents qualified as voters based on a universal minimum level of property ownership, regardless of race.

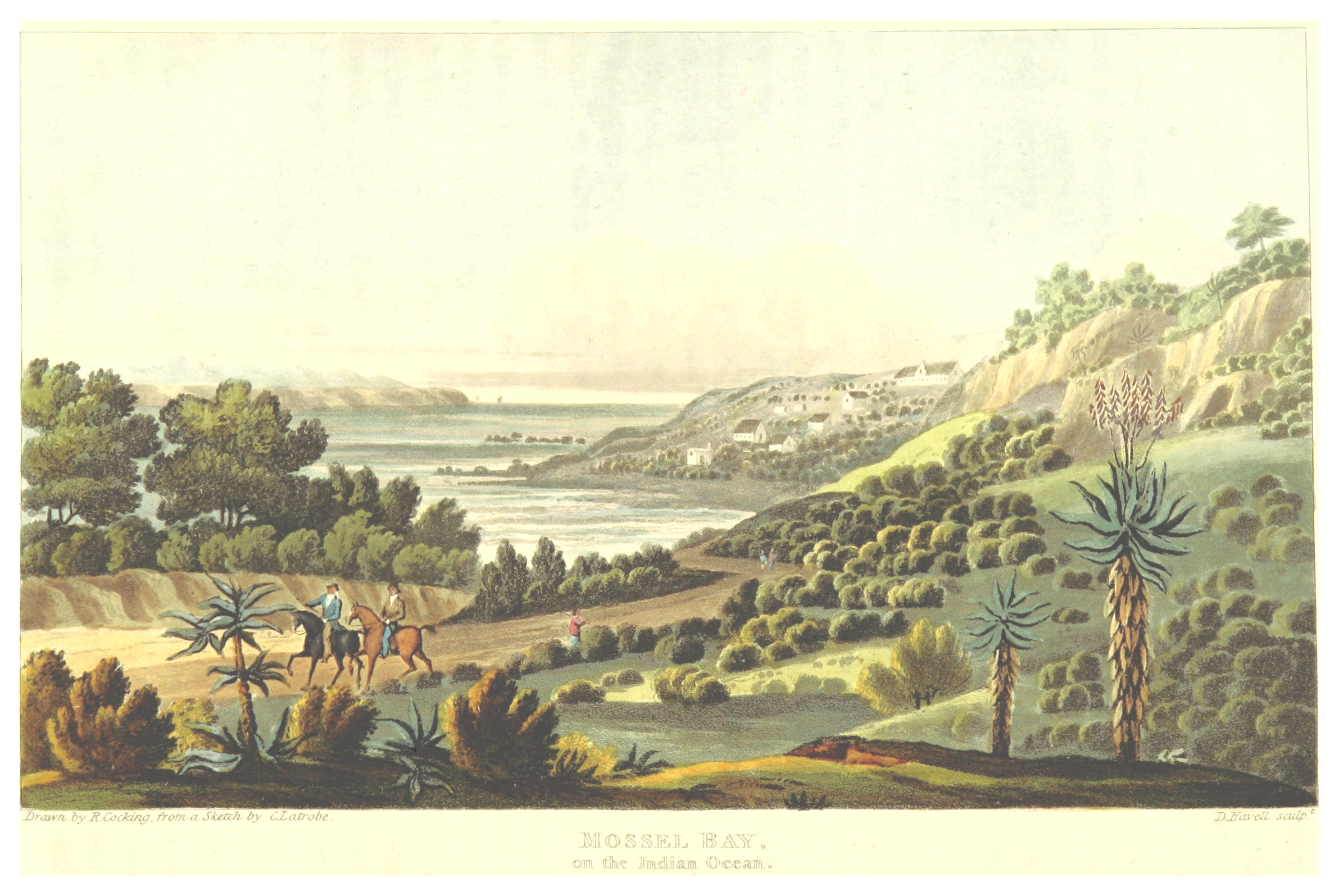
Mossel Bay on the Indian Ocean, 1818

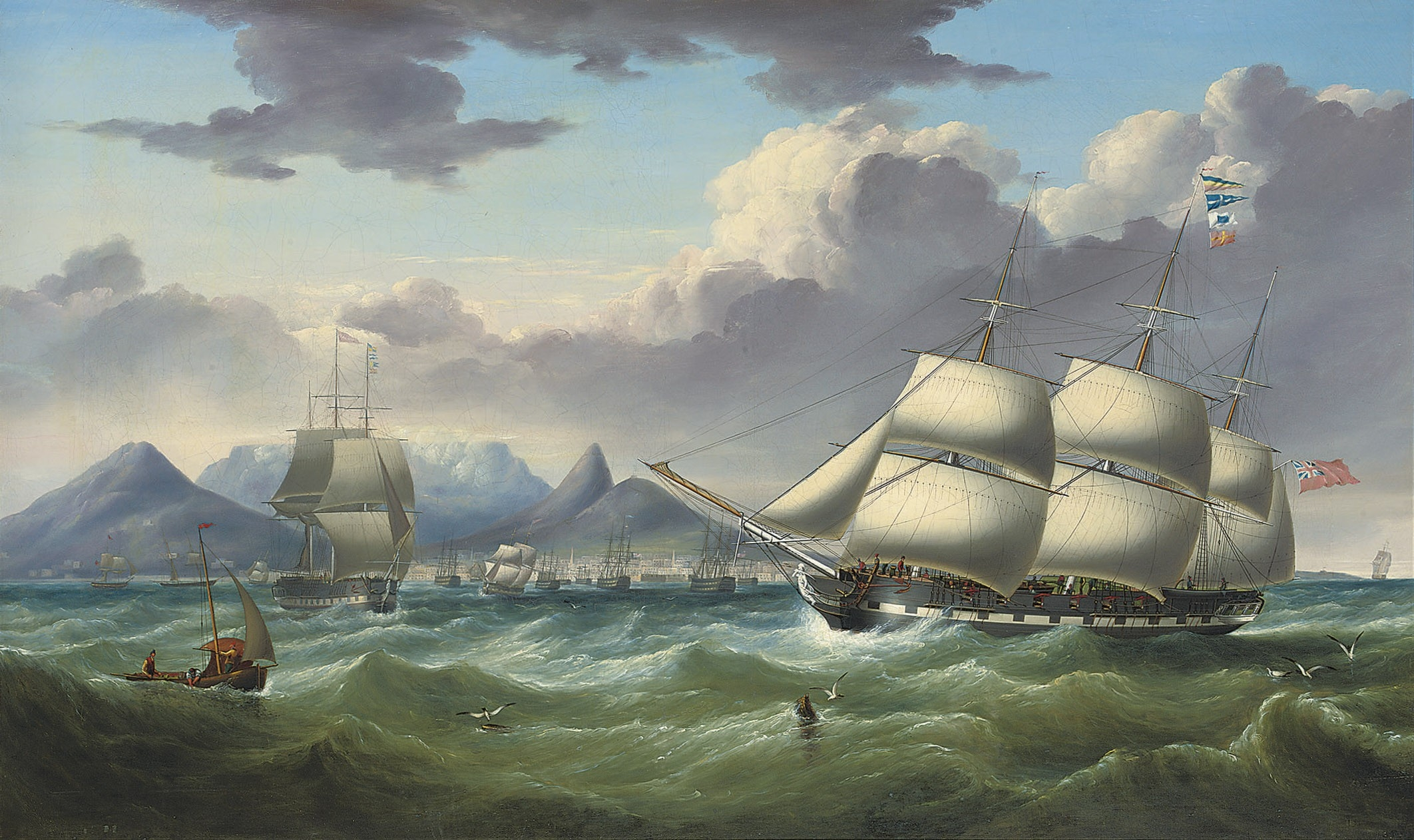
Table Bay, Cape Town, circa 1832

Executive power remaining completely in the authority of the British governor did not relieve tensions in the colony between its eastern and western sections.

=== Responsible government ===
In 1872, after a long political battle, the Cape of Good Hope achieved responsible government under its first Prime Minister, John Molteno. Henceforth, an elected Prime Minister and his cabinet had total responsibility for the affairs of the country. A period of strong economic growth and social development ensued, and the eastern-western division was largely laid to rest. The system of multi-racial franchise also began a slow and fragile growth in political inclusiveness, and ethnic tensions subsided. In 1877, the state expanded by annexing Griqualand West and Griqualand East – that is, the Mount Currie district (Kokstad). The emergence of two Boer mini-republics along the Missionary Road resulted in 1885 in the Warren Expedition, sent to annex the republics of Stellaland and Goshen (lands annexed to British Bechuanaland). Major-General Charles Warren annexed the land south of the Molopo River as the colony of British Bechuanaland and proclaimed a protectorate over the land lying to the North of the river. Vryburg, the capital of Stellaland, became capital of British Bechuanaland, while Mafeking (now Mahikeng), although situated south of the protectorate border, became the protectorate's administrative centre. The border between the protectorate and the colony ran along the Molopo and Nossob rivers. In 1895, British Bechuanaland became part of the Cape Colony.

However, the discovery of diamonds around Kimberley and gold in the Transvaal led to a return to instability, particularly because they fuelled the rise to power of the ambitious imperialist Cecil Rhodes. On becoming the Cape's Prime Minister in 1890, he instigated a rapid expansion of British influence into the hinterland. In particular, he sought to engineer the conquest of the Transvaal, and although his ill-fated Jameson Raid failed and brought down his government, it led to the Second Boer War and British conquest at the turn of the century. The politics of the colony consequently came to be increasingly dominated by tensions between the British colonists and the Boers. Rhodes also brought in the first formal restrictions on the political rights of the Cape of Good Hope's black African citizens.

The Cape of Good Hope remained nominally under British rule until the formation of the Union of South Africa in 1910, when it became the province of the Cape of Good Hope, better known as the Cape Province.

== Districts ==
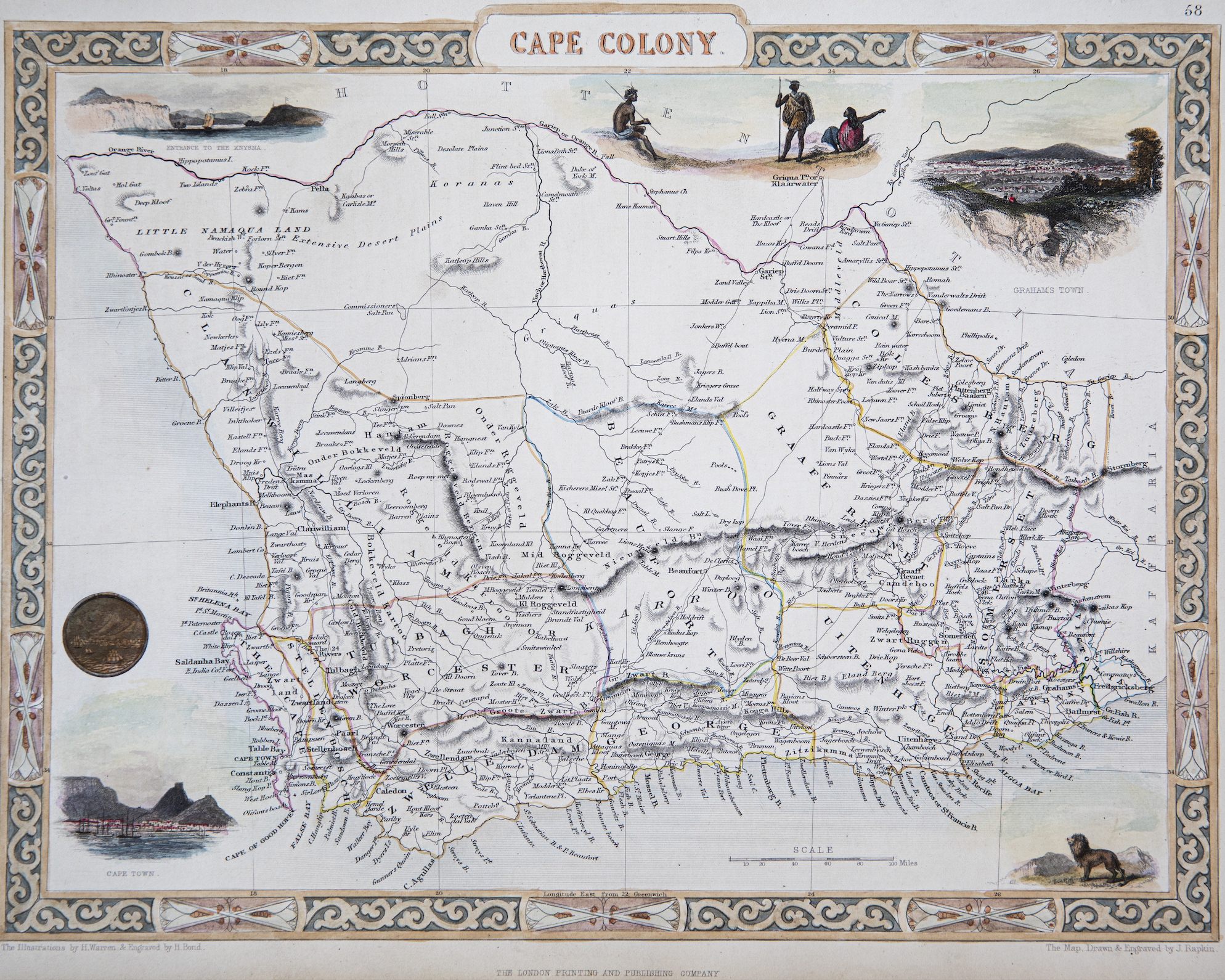
Tallis Map of the Cape Colony, 1850.

The districts of the colony in 1850 were:

- Clanwilliam
- The Cape
- Stellenbosch
- Zwellendam
- Tulbagh/Worcester
- Beaufort
- George
- Uitenhague
- Albany
- Victoria
- Somerset
- Graaf Reynet
- Colesberg

== Demographics ==
Population figures for the 1865, 1875, 1891 and 1904 censuses. Groups marked "nd" are Not Distinguished in the censuses for those years.

Population of the Cape Colony exclusive of military.
Year	Christian Males*	Christian Females*	Free Blacks Males	Free Blacks Females	Khoekhoe Males	Khoekhoe Females	Slaves Males	Slaves Females	Total
1807	13,624	11,990	529	605	8,496	8,935	18,990	10,313	73,482
1817	20,750	18,884	918	958	11,640	11,796	19,481	12,565	97,335
1823	25,487	23,212	891	1,098	15,336	15,213	19,786	13,412	116,205
1833	50,881	45,210	nd	nd	nd	nd	19,378	14,244	129,713

* Includes both free Coloured people and Whites

Settlement populations in 1833.
District areas	Free Males	Free Females	Male Slaves	Female Slaves	Total population	Percentage enslaved
Cape Town	6,656	7,016	2,864	2,691	19,227	28.89%
Cape District	4,193	3,489	2,735	1,523	11,940	35.66%
Stellenbosch	3,929	3,653	5,492	3,063	16,137	53.01%
Swellendam	6,125	5,717	1,596	1,428	14,866	20.34%
George	2,976	2,669	1,130	1,100	7,875	28.32%
Uitenhage	4,595	3,199	672	626	9,092	14.28%
Albany	4,850	4,525	75	69	9,519	1.51%
Somerset	5,340	4,649	76	680	10,745	7.04%
Graaff-Reinet	6,397	4,613	1,505	944	13,459	18.20%
Total	45,061	39,530	16,145	12,124	112,860	25.05%

Cape Colony 1840 census data
Population group	reported number
Whites of Dutch, French & Swedish descent	50,000
Whites of British descent	12,000
Emancipated slaves of 1834	35,000
Free coloured people before 1834	10,000
Hottentots & Bushmen	40,000
Coloured strangers from the interior	15,000
Total	162,000

Census data: 1865–1904
Population group	1865 Census		1875 Census		1891 Census		1904 Census	
	Number	Per cent (%)	Number	Per cent (%)	Number	Per cent (%)	Number	Per cent (%)
Black	147,236	29.66	287,639	39.89	838,136	54.87	1,424,787	59.12
White	181,592	36.58	236,783	32.84	376,987	24.68	579,741	24.05
Coloured	167,553	33.76	196,562	27.26	310,401	20.32	395,034	16.39
Asian	nd	*	nd	*	1,700	0.11	10,242	0.42
Total	496,381	100.00	720,984	100.00	1,527,224	100.00	2,409,804	100.00

1865 Cape Colony Census, 'Whites' Percentage.

1865 Cape Colony Census, 'Coloured' Percentage.

== See also ==
- Cape Colonial Forces
- Cape Government Railways
- Cape Qualified Franchise
- Parliament of the Cape of Good Hope
