= Watermeyer =

Watermeyer is a surname. Notable people with the surname include:

- Egidius Benedictus Watermeyer (1824–1867), Cape Colony judge
- Ernest Frederick Watermeyer (1880–1958), South African chief justice
- Frederick Stephanus Watermeyer (1828-1864), Cape Colony journalist, advocate, and politician
- Philip Johannes Andries Watermeyer (1825-1897), Cape Colony politician
- Stefan Watermeyer (born 1988), South African rugby union player
