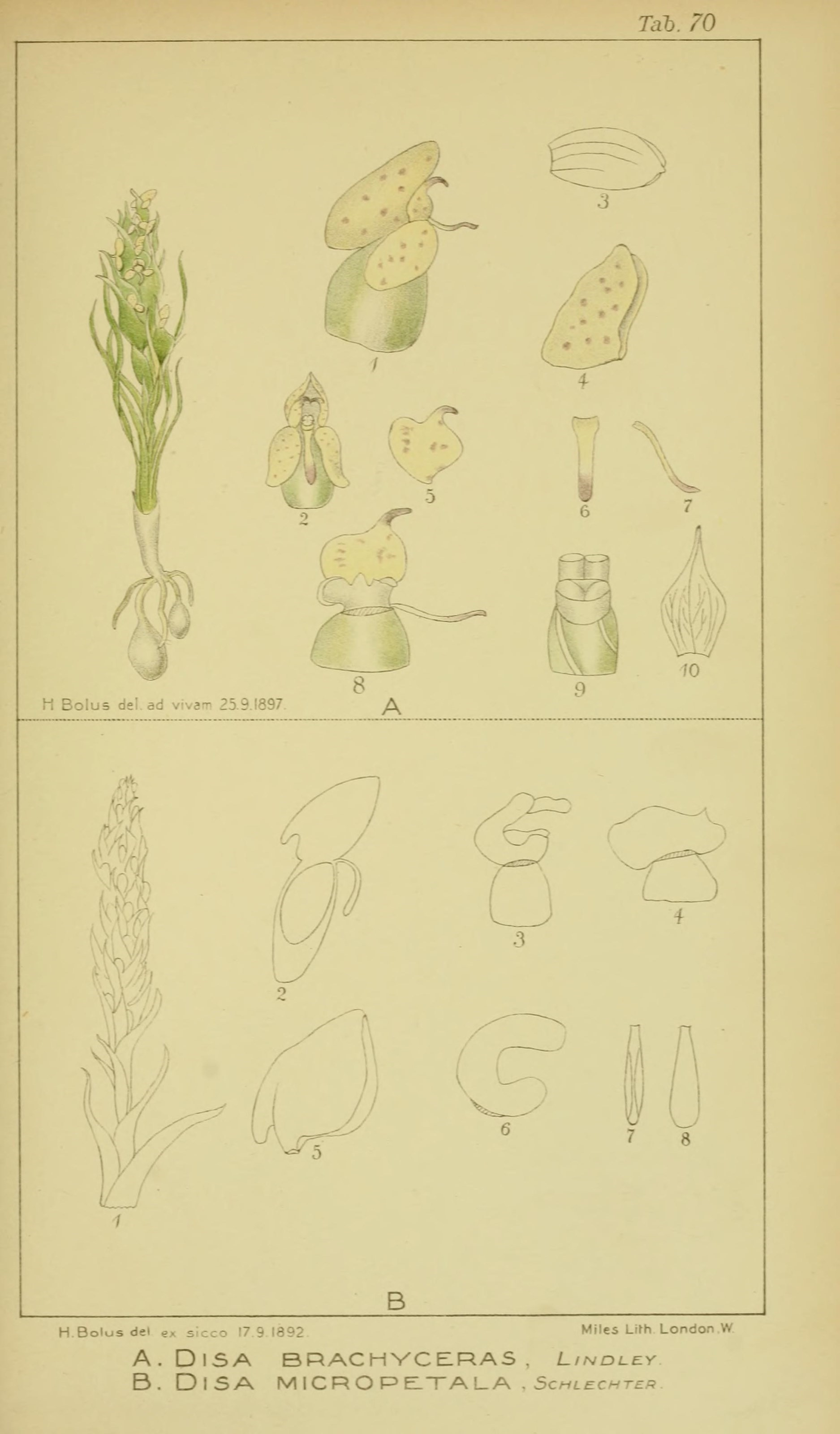

Scientific classification
- Kingdom: Plantae
- Clade: Tracheophytes
- Clade: Angiosperms
- Clade: Monocots
- Order: Asparagales
- Family: Orchidaceae
- Subfamily: Orchidoideae
- Genus: Disa
- Species: D. brachyceras

Binomial name
- Disa brachyceras Lindl.

Synonyms
- Disa tenella var. brachyceras (Lindl.) Schltr.

= Disa brachyceras =

Species of flowering plant

Disa brachyceras is a perennial plant and geophyte belonging to the genus Disa and is part of the fynbos. The species is endemic to the Western Cape and has always been found from Stellenbosch to Stanford. Currently, the plant only occurs at Shaw's Mountain. There used to be nine subpopulations but only one remains. The reasons for the loss of habitat are urban development and crop cultivation. The plant is dependent on fires to flower and because it is surrounded by other crops it is not burned.
