= Christian Groepe =

Military leader of the Khoi people

Field Commandant Christian Jacobus Groepe (c. 1789–1886) was a military leader of the Khoi people of Kat River, Cape Colony, in the nineteenth century.

== Early life ==
Christian Groepe was the mixed-race son of Maria and Heinrich Grupe. His mother was a freed slave of Cape ancestry, and his father was a farm labourer of German ancestry.

While he kept strong connections with German family and friends, he also seems to have identified primarily with the local Khoikhoi people, possibly through his mother's influence. He is first recorded as a wealthy Khoikhoi businessman, land-owner and community leader among the Gonaqua Khoi people of the Kat River Settlements, near the Eastern Cape frontier. Kat River was a large, successful and predominantly Khoi region of the Cape, that subsisted more or less autonomously. Aside from the Afrikaans-speaking Gonaqua Khoi, the settlement had also attracted large numbers of other Khoi, Xhosa and mixed-race groups of the Cape.

In 1834, the Surveyor General of the Cape Colony, W.F.Hertzog, recorded a "Christiaan Groepe" as being a wealthy, highly educated and "respectable" Khoi, who had originally arrived from Baviaans River with a large number of followers, and had settled them in the central "Tamboekiesvallei" area of Kat River. The Kat River Khoi, situated near the frontier and renowned as excellent marksmen, were frequently and gratuitously recruited by the Cape Colony in its frontier wars with the neighboring Xhosa.

== Military service on the frontier ==
Commandant Groepe fought in the frontier wars alongside Andries Stockenstrom, John Molteno and Andries Botha. In the Amatola War they led the local Cape Commandos that – vastly outnumbered – defeated Sandile's gunmen and fought their way into the Amatola fastnesses.

They then rode deep into the Xhosa heartland of the Transkei and met Sarhili, the paramount Chief of all the Xhosa, to negotiate a peace treaty. All this while, the British Imperial Troops had largely retreated to their forts further west.

Commandant Groepe was noted as repeatedly distinguishing himself by his bravery and leadership, as were many of his colleagues. Consequently, he returned to the Kat River Settlements as a celebrated war hero.

== The Kat River Rebellion and treason trials ==
In spite of his status as a respected war veteran and a well-educated gentleman, Groepe nonetheless faced the prejudice that pervaded many sectors of colonial society. Thomas Pringle records Groepe's difficulties with the colonial clergy who refused to conduct his marriage on the excuse that his bride could not recite the Catechism correctly in English. A wide range of similar such grievances eventually led him and his colleague Andries Botha to openly sympathize with those of the "Kat River" Khoi who joined the rebellion of 1850. In a controversial and much-publicized trial, he and several of his fellow Khoi leaders were tried for high treason for the rebellion.

The trial was immensely controversial at the time. Opponents accused it of being a prejudiced witch-hunt, and several powerful Cape figures such as Andries Stockenstrom declared strong public support for Groepe and his co-accused. Although the Khoi community leaders were found guilty, the trial was widely acknowledged to be a biased and vindictive political show-trial, and the sentences were repealed.

While large sections of the Kat River Settlement were later broken up due to the rebellion and frontier conflicts with the Xhosa, in 1920 Groepe's descendants were still recorded as land-owners in the original Kat River region, and as managers of estates in nearby Bellvale and Readsdale.

== See also ==
- Andries Botha
- Xhosa Wars
- Khoikhoi
- Andries Stockenstrom
