= Erica hendricksei =

Scientific classification
- Kingdom: Plantae
- Clade: Tracheophytes
- Clade: Angiosperms
- Clade: Eudicots
- Clade: Asterids
- Order: Ericales
- Family: Ericaceae
- Genus: Erica
- Species: E. hendricksei

Binomial name
- Erica hendricksei H.A.Baker

Species of flowering plant

Erica hendricksei is a plant belonging to the genus Erica and forming part of the fynbos. The species is endemic to the Western Cape and occurs in the Kleinrivier Mountains between Hermanus and Stanford. There are five subpopulations and the habitat is threatened by invasive plants.
