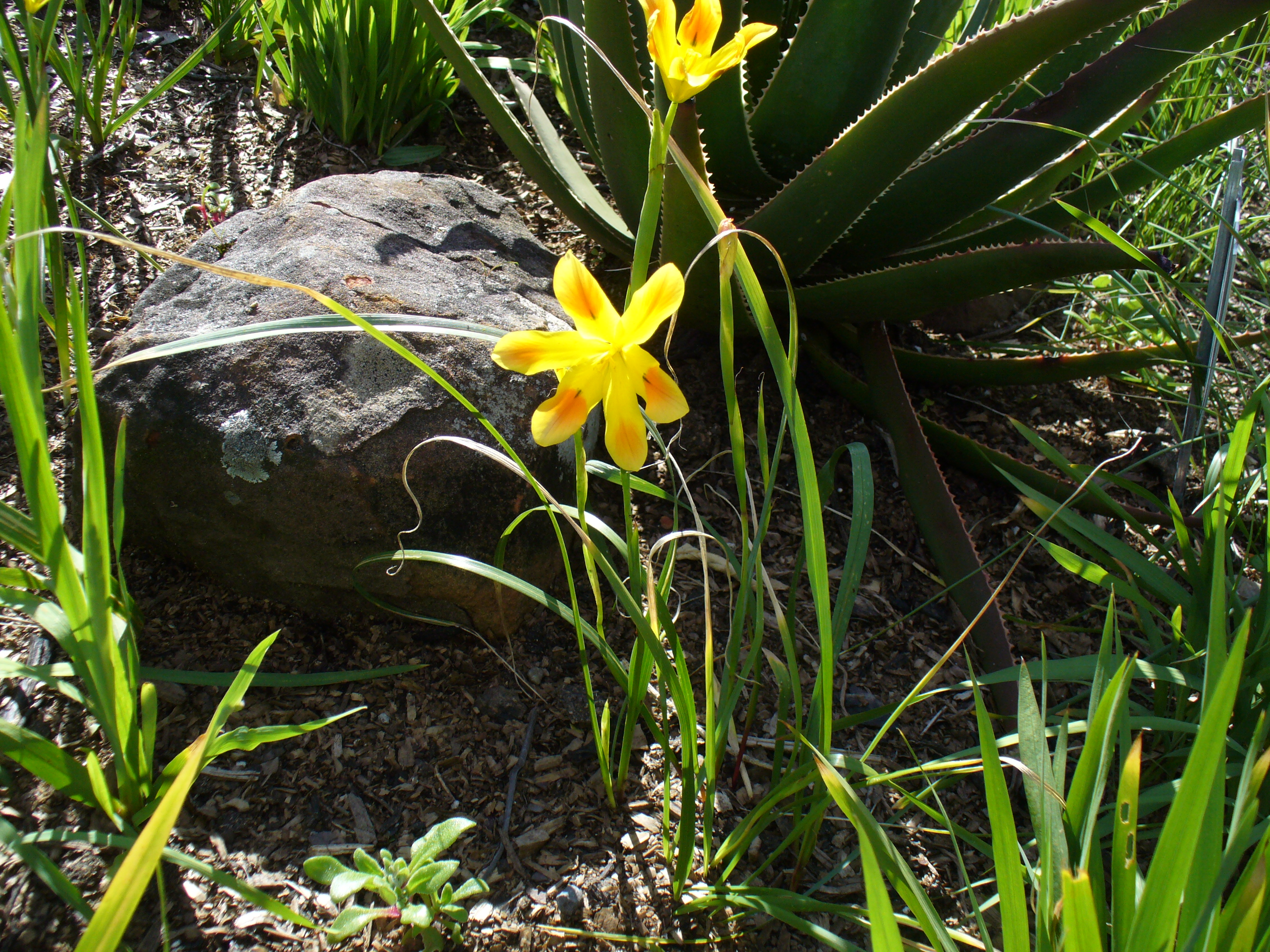

Scientific classification
- Kingdom: Plantae
- Clade: Tracheophytes
- Clade: Angiosperms
- Clade: Monocots
- Order: Asparagales
- Family: Iridaceae
- Genus: Moraea
- Species: M. comptonii

Binomial name
- Moraea comptonii (L.Bolus) Goldblatt

Synonyms
- Homeria comptonii L.Bolus

= Moraea comptonii =

Species of flowering plant

Moraea comptonii, commonly known in Afrikaans as the ruiktulp, is a plant and geophyte belonging to the genus Moraea and is part of the renosterveld vegetation. The species is endemic to the Western Cape and occurs from Villiersdorp to Stanford. Over the past 70 years, the plant has lost 80% of its habitat to crop cultivation. Invasive plants also pose a threat.
