= Philip Johannes Andries Watermeyer =

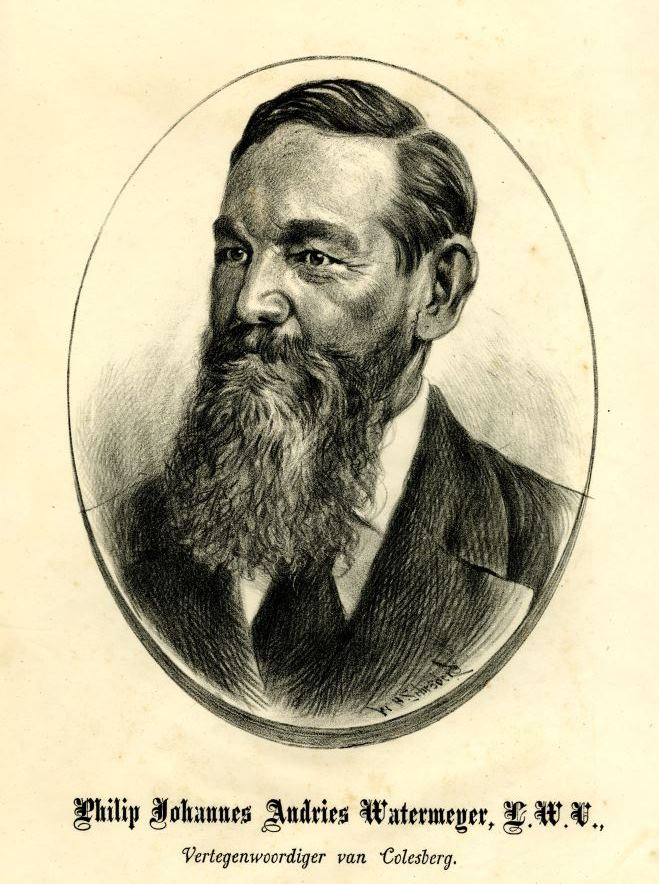
PJA Watermeyer, from an 1883 portrait sketch

Philippus Johannes Andries Watermeyer (1825-1897) was a prominent Member of the Cape Legislative Assembly.

== Family ==
Born in 1825, his family, the Watermeyers, were a distinguished family of liberal "Cape Dutch" Afrikaners - many of whom served in high office. Philip was the uncle of the MLA brothers, Ben and Frank Watermeyer.

== Parliament ==
Philip Watermeyer represented the electoral district of Colesberg in the 1860s, 70s and 80s. Colesberg was one of the most remote districts of the Cape, far in the north, and he had to travel 14 days from there to reach Cape Town for parliamentary sessions.

Within the Cape Parliament, he served unofficially as the supporter of the rights and policies of the Orange Free State, and as a spokesman for both Boer republics in the Cape Legislative Assembly.

=== Responsible Government ===
Philip Watermeyer was unusual however, in that he was the only Afrikaans Member of Parliament who strongly favoured greater British Imperial control in southern Africa. As such, he strongly opposed the growing movement for "responsible government" (local democratic self-rule), quite unlike most of his family members. In 1871 however, when the "responsibles" were on the verge of victory, Philip underwent a dramatic conversion, and became a supporter of the movement.

=== Federation ===
In 1875, he was one of the minority of Cape MPs who went along with the Confederation plan of Carnarvon, believing that it would do justice to the Free State's bid for the Griqualand West diamond fields. He had strongly opposed the proposal that the Cape annex Griqualand West (at the time claimed by the Free State). However, the Orange Free State refused to have any dealings with the Confederation plan.

He also propounded the theory that the Cape would be threatened by a unification of Griqualand West, the Orange Free State and the British colony of Natal (and therefore should pre-empt it by joining Carnarvon's confederation).

In 1876, he accompanied President Burgers of the Transvaal Republic to Berlin, where the President was to negotiate for German protection against the British Confederation scheme. He was then noticed for publicly applauding the British invasion and annexation of the Transvaal Republic. He then threatened the Cape with the loss of its constitution if it did not likewise comply. He was famously referred to by Andries Botha as "the Colesberg Fox".
