= Erica capillaris =

Scientific classification
- Kingdom: Plantae
- Clade: Tracheophytes
- Clade: Angiosperms
- Clade: Eudicots
- Clade: Asterids
- Order: Ericales
- Family: Ericaceae
- Genus: Erica
- Species: E. capillaris

Binomial name
- Erica capillaris Bartl.

Synonyms
- Ericoides capillare (Bartl.) Kuntze(

Species of flowering plant

Erica capillaris is a plant belonging to the genus Erica and forming part of the fynbos. The species is endemic to the Western Cape where it occurs from the Cape Peninsula to Stanford. The plant was initially widespread but there are currently only four to five fragmented populations remaining. The plant's habitat is threatened by development, agricultural activities, invasive plants and wildfires.
