= Fairbairn College =

Private, co-educational high school in Goodwood, Cape Town

Coordinates: 33°53′58.19″S 18°33′50.81″E

- Goodwood, Western Cape, South Africa

Information
- Type: Public high school
- Motto: Veritas et Integritas (Truthfulness and Integrity)
- Established: 1 October 1976
- Staff: Ruschda O' Shea (Principal)
- Enrollment: approx 1000 learners
- Information: admin@fairbairncollege.com
- Colours: Navy blue, pale blue and white
- Website: http://www.fairbairncollege.com

Fairbairn College is a public, co-educational high school in Goodwood near Cape Town, Western Cape, South Africa.

== History ==
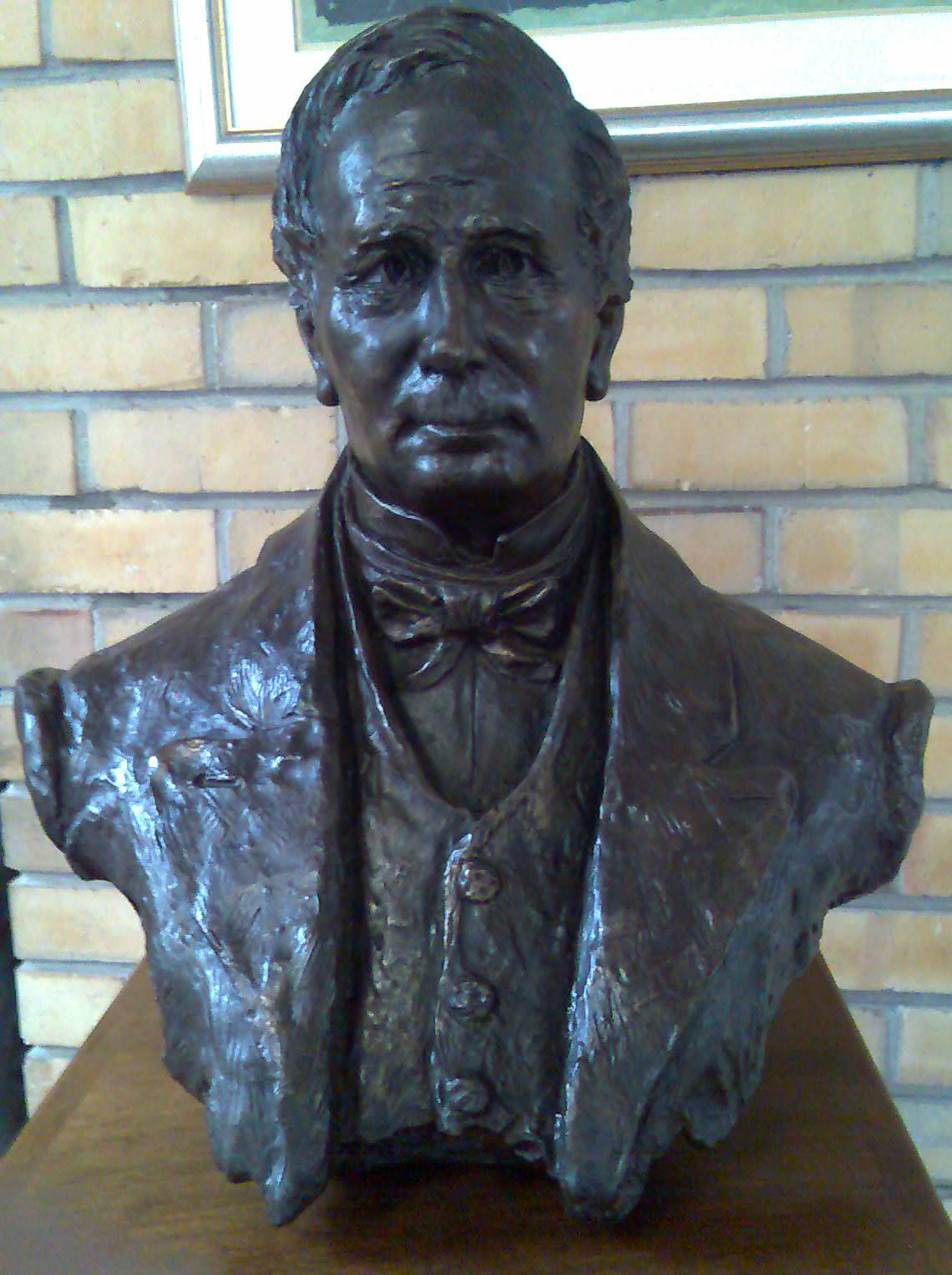
Bust of John Fairbairn in hall foyer

The Goodwood/Vasco English-medium High School was founded on 1 October 1976 with the appointment of CE de Wet as Headmaster. The deputy principal and secretary were temporarily accommodated in the board room of the Parow School Board until completion of the administrative section of the College in January 1977.

The Opening Assembly was held on 19 January 1977 with a staff of nineteen teachers and 356 pupils. In the first year, Fairbairn catered for Standards 6, 7 and 8 pupils. The majority of Standards 7 and 8 pupils were enrolled from the nearby JG Meiring High School.

Fairbairn was officially inaugurated a year later, on 24 February 1978, by PS Meyer, Director of Education of the Cape Province.

At the first meeting on 28 March 1977, the School Committee unanimously decided to name the school Fairbairn College. However, the Parow School Board and Cape Education Department over-ruled their decision, approving instead the name Fairbairn High School. The School was named after John Fairbairn who was invited to the Cape by Thomas Pringle to start a school for the children of the 1820 Settlers. After Fairbairn was declared a Model C state-aided school, the Governing Body, on 23 November 1992, unanimously resolved to use its new powers to change the name to Fairbairn College. The Cape Education Department was informed of this decision and the name was changed in the official records on 11 February 1993.

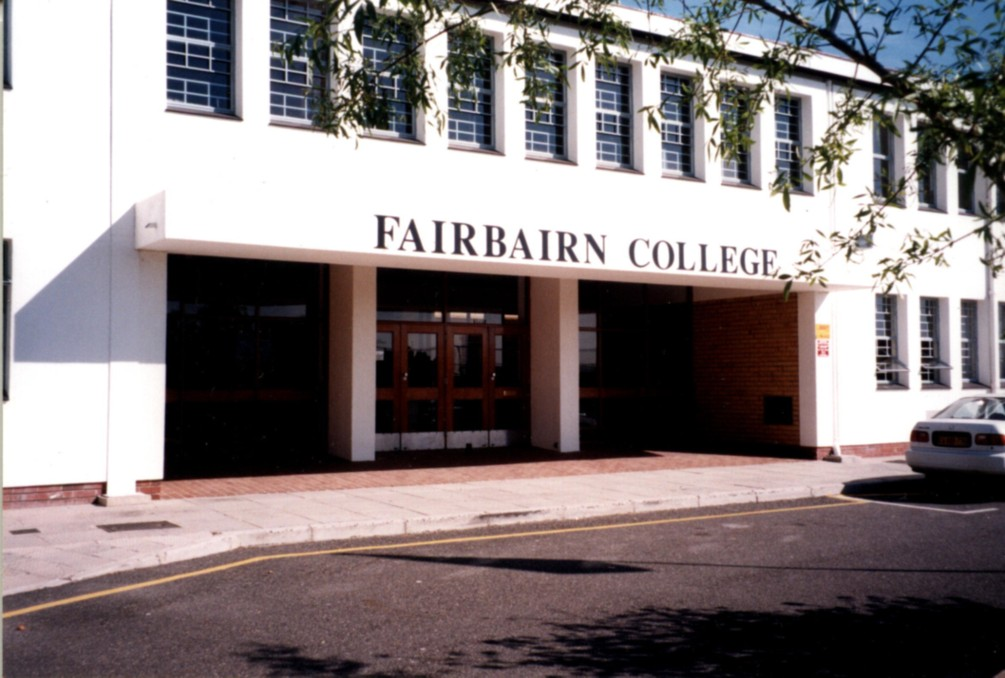
Main entrance

== Principals ==
- 1 October 1976 – 30 September 1983 CE de Wet
- 1 October 1983 – 30 June 1998 RK Weatherdon
- 1 January 1999 – 31 December 2001 SL van Zyl
- 1 July 2002 – 30 June 2021 B Marchand
- 1 January 2022 – R O' Shea

== Learning areas offered ==
Grade	Learning Area
8 & 9	Afrikaans 1st Additional Language
8 & 9	Afrikaans 2nd Additional Language
8 & 9	Arts & Culture
8 & 9	Economic & Management Sciences
8 & 9	English Home Language
8 & 9	Human & Social Sciences
8 & 9	Life Orientation
8 & 9	Mathematics
8 & 9	Music
8 & 9	Natural Sciences
8 & 9	Technology

Grade	Learning Area
10, 11 & 12	Accounting
10, 11 & 12	Afrikaans 1st Additional Language
10, 11 & 12	Business Studies
10, 11 & 12	Computer Applications Technology
10, 11 & 12	Consumer Studies
10, 11 & 12	English Home Language
10, 11 & 12	Geography
10, 11 & 12	Life Orientation
10, 11 & 12	Life Sciences
10, 11 & 12	Mathematical Literacy
10, 11 & 12	Mathematics
10, 11 & 12	Music
10, 11 & 12	Physical Sciences

== Facilities ==
Extramural facilities include a swimming pool, three rugby fields, four cricket fields, five cricket nets, three hockey fields, one astro field, four netball courts, nine tennis courts, two squash courts, a change-room complex and a club house.

The fields, Aurora, Chapman, Nautilus, Osborn and Weymouth, were named for five of the Government Settler Scheme ships that brought the 1820 Settlers to the Cape.

== Big Walk ==
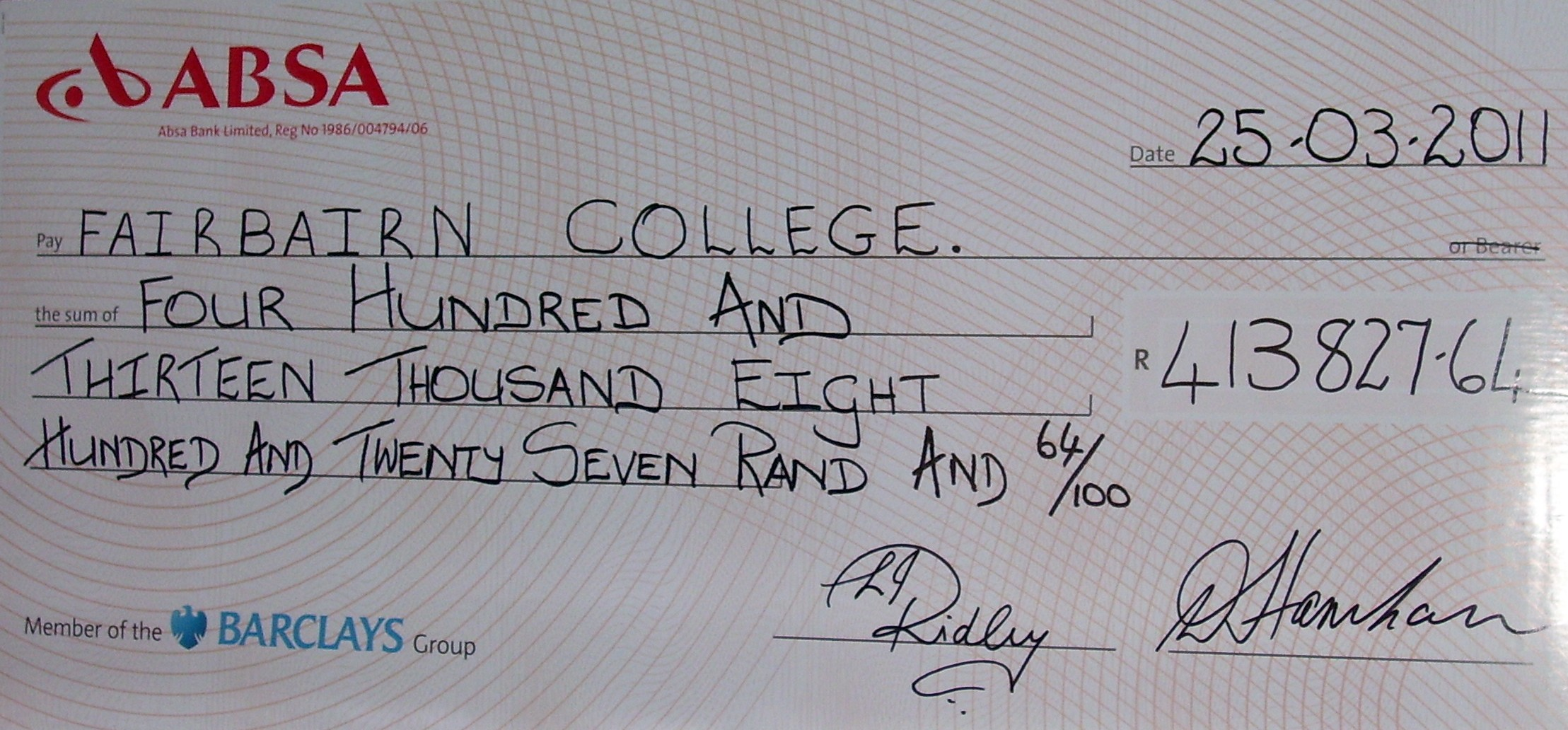
Funds raised by learners during 2011 "Big Walk"

The Big Walk was instituted at Fairbairn College in the days when schools received their basic funding from the State but had to rely on voluntary contributions from parents for any "extras".

The funds raised by the Big Walk in the past made it possible for the school to install a swimming pool, build the squash courts and Club House, erect six additional tennis courts and develop three hockey and three rugby fields. The installation of the first computer centre at Faibairn, in 1998, was made possible by the Big Walk.

The School Governing Body budgets for an income from the Big Walk. If the Big Walk was discontinued, the annual per capita school fees would have to be increased.

The Big Walk has acquired an additional importance. It helps to build school and class spirit. Learners get to know their teachers in an informal setting whilst out collecting money.

To promote class spirit and to motivate the learners, the Big Walk is run as a competition.

The total raised by the learners in 2011 was R413 827.64

In 2016, the school reached a milestone by raising over R500 000

In 2020, the total raised by learners was R554 082.05

== House system ==
Fairbairn operates a comprehensive intramural or interhouse competition. The aims of the house system are to encourage a spirit of friendly competition and sportsmanship within the College, involve as many learners as possible, especially those who are not good enough at sport to be chosen for inter-school events, build up the Esprit de Corps of the College and create positions of leadership for learners and thereby promote their personal growth. To this end, the school is divided into three houses.

The houses to which learners are allocated are Grey (White), Somerset (Blue) and Napier (Red). The houses are named after Sir George Grey, Lord Charles Somerset and Sir George Thomas Napier, British governors of the Cape Colony in the 1800s.

The highlight of the year is the Interhouse Athletics Competition comprising track and field events. This together with the swimming gala is held in the first term.

In addition to competitions in all the major sports (including: hockey, rugby, netball and chess), an interhouse quiz, in which every learner participates, is held in the third term.

=== The House Flags ===
Grey House	Napier House	Somerset House

== Extramural activities ==
=== Boys ===
- Summer: Cricket, Tennis, Swimming, Water polo,
- Winter: Hockey, Rugby, Table Tennis, Squash, Soccer, Chess

=== Girls ===
- Summer: Tennis, Swimming, Water polo, Softball
- Winter: Hockey, Netball, Tennis, Squash, Soccer, Rugby

Girls also have an option to become cricket scorers.

=== Cultural activities ===
- Choir
- Dance
- Orchestra
- Jazz Band
- Drama Society
- Debate Society
- Culinary Society
- Photography Society
- Christian Society
- Islam Society
- First Aid Society

== Student Societies ==
- Photography Society
- Library Society
- Debate Society
- Interact Society
- Recycling Society
- Dance Society
- Drama Society
- Muslim Student Association
- The Christian Youth Society
- The Culinary Craft Society (for Grade 11 & 12 students)
- First Aid
- Matric Farewell Committee (for Grade 11 learners only)

== College Choir ==
In 1977, shortly after the foundation of the school, a mixed choir was founded which quickly became, and remains, the cultural showpiece of Fairbairn. In its early years, the choir performed radio broadcasts as well as performing for the Goodwood community, in churches, eisteddfods and pageants.

As early as 1979 the College Choir made its first recording. This was either a tape or a long playing record. In 2004, the choir, accompanied by the school organ and orchestra, recorded a CD.

It has become tradition for the choir to perform "The Hallelujah Chorus" at the Founders’ Day service in February each year. It has also become custom for Past Pupils who were choir members to join the choir on Founders’ Day.

The Servant Song by Richard Gilliard has been sung by the choir at funerals of educators and learners.

The choir's premier performance is on the first and second day of the fourth term at Prize Giving. On the third day it has to perform at the Valedictory Service without the matrics. The result is that, at that time of the year, the Choir Director is in effect running two choirs. The singing of Fill the World with Love from the film Goodbye Mr Chips is guaranteed to bring a tear to many an eye. As the matrics leave the CE de Wet Hall for the last time, the Choir leads the congregation in singing God Be With You Till We Meet Again.

== Carol Service ==
A Carol Service, of one hour duration, is held in the CE de Wet Hall on the second last day of the academic year. The choir files into the darkened hall bearing candles and singing Once in Royal David's City. The programme is interspersed with Bible readings, prayers, congregational singing and choir and solo performances. The performance of O holy night is always memorable.

== College song ==
In June 1980, Bruwer, Head of Music, was in Salisbury, England with her family. de Wet, the founder Headmaster, asked her to try to find a school song for Fairbairn while she was in England.

One evening she was sitting in Salisbury Cathedral and the gentleman sitting next to her introduced himself as the Reverend Hugh Blenkin. When she told him about her mission to find a school song, he offered to write it. The words were written by the Reverend Hugh Blenkin and the music composed by Bruwer.

The College song was sung for the first time in March 1981.

== 30th Anniversary ==
The 30th anniversary of the founding of Fairbairn College was celebrated during 2007. The highlight of the celebrations was the Founders’ Day assembly on Friday, 23 February. Cameron Dugmore, then Western Cape Minister of Education, was the guest speaker during the assembly.

On Saturday, 24 February, a formal dinner was held in the CE de Wet Hall for staff, governing body members, principals of surrounding schools, education officials, and friends of the school. Barry Volschenk, Director of EMDC Metropole North, was the guest speaker. The guests were also treated to a PowerPoint presentation on the history of the school.

A special lapel badge was presented to every learner and educator to be worn during the anniversary year.

== Notable past pupils ==
- Ryan ten Doeschate matriculated in 1998. Whilst at school, he excelled at both rugby and cricket. His leadership potential was recognised with his appointment as a College Prefect. Because of his Dutch ancestry, he plays One-Day International cricket for the Netherlands. He represented the Netherlands at the Cricket World Cup in 2007.
- Karen van der Westhuizen (1998) has excelled at the sport of squash. In 2007 she was the women's champion in the Western Province Squash Closed Championships. She has represented South Africa at the World Tournament and the World Squash Federation Women's World Team Championship.
- Ryan Canning (Deputy Head Boy 2001) is a talented cricketer. As a schoolboy, he represented Western Province from under 13. He currently plays first class cricket for the Cape Cobras.
- Andre Petim (2003) is the goalkeeper for Premier Soccer League club Ajax Cape Town.
