= John Fairbairn (educator) =

South African businessman and politician

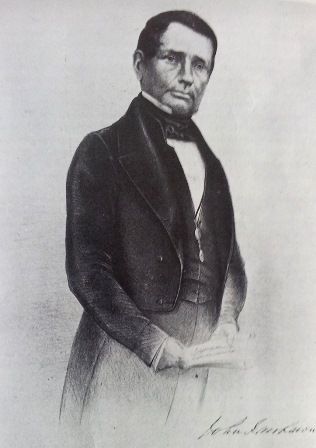
- Born: 9 April 1794; Roxburghshire, Scotland
- Died: 5 October 1864 (aged 70); Cape Town, Cape Colony
- Occupations: Teacher, newspaper proprietor, politician and financier

John Fairbairn (9 April 1794 – 5 October 1864) was a newspaper proprietor, educator, financier and politician of the Cape Colony.

According to the Standard Encyclopaedia of Southern Africa, "The embryo of the State education system we know today, trial by jury, the principle of the mutual life assurance company – all these were fruits of his endeavours at the Cape".

== Early life ==
John Fairbairn was born in Carolside Mill in the Parish of Legerwood, Berwickshire, Scotland on 9 April 1794, the son of James Fairbairn and Agnes Brack, who married at Lauder, Berwickshire 20 March 1783, James living in the Parish of Westruther, Berwickshire at the time.

He attended the University of Edinburgh where he studied Medicine "acquiring at the same time a more than passing knowledge of classical languages and mathematics". He did not graduate and, in 1818, he turned to education, and for more than 5 years taught at Bruce's Academy in Newcastle upon Tyne. Here he also joined the Literary and Philosophical Society.

In 1822, Thomas Pringle persuaded him to emigrate to Cape Town, promising a literary and teaching career in the recently annexed Cape Colony.

== Newspaper proprietor ==
Fairbairn arrived in Table Bay on 11 October 1823 aboard the brig Mary. The Cape at the time was under the authoritarian control of the British governor Lord Charles Somerset. Both the school and the scientific society which Pringle and Fairbairn tried to establish, both were obstructed and shut in 1824-1825 because of the governor's disapproval of their activities.

With Pringle, he then turned to editing. Together they founded a periodical, the South African Journal in 1824, but the governor closed it in the same year. They then founded another periodical, the New Organ in 1826 but it immediately suffered the same fate.

=== The Commercial Advertiser ===
He and Pringle had been invited by George Greig in January 1824 to take over the editing of The South African Commercial Advertiser, southern Africa's first private and independent newspaper. The governor censored the paper in May 1824, due to the reporting of a libel case that the governor was already involved in. The newspaper reopened in 1825 with Fairbairn as the only editor, and he continued until 1859. He became sole owner too in 1835, when he purchased Greig's shares.

The newspaper faced further suppression, and in 1827 Fairbairn travelled to London to seek justice. He was given permission to open the newspaper again, but only if he avoided all controversy regarding politics or public persons. By this time, Fairbairn had acquired a considerable following among the normal citizens of the Cape Colony.

In 1829, the press was given freedom from the governor's control, but still were bound by strong libel rules. Three decades later in 1859, Fairbairn was eventually to help pass the bill in parliament to end these restrictions.

Fairbairn was strongly liberal, and had been a radical abolitionist in his early career. Via his newspaper, he publicly maintained that most conflict on the frontier was entirely the fault of the colonists, not of the Xhosa, and he advocated equal treaties with the Xhosa states based on international law. He therefore supported the frontier policy of Andries Stockenstrom which aspired to establish exactly that.

In the mid-1830s, the Commercial Advertiser, representing the Cape Town liberals, was engaged in a "newspaper war" with the main newspaper of the conservative eastern frontier, Robert Godlonton's Grahamstown Journal. The country's main Dutch newspaper, De Zuid Afrikaan ended up siding with the Grahamstown Journal. In spite of the pressure, Fairbairn maintained his position of siding with the Xhosa, up until the outbreak of the 7th Frontier War (1846), when the circumstances of its outbreak led him to become disillusioned and pessimistic regarding the entire frontier situation. He even publicly condemned the Xhosa chiefs for their actions.

== Family life ==
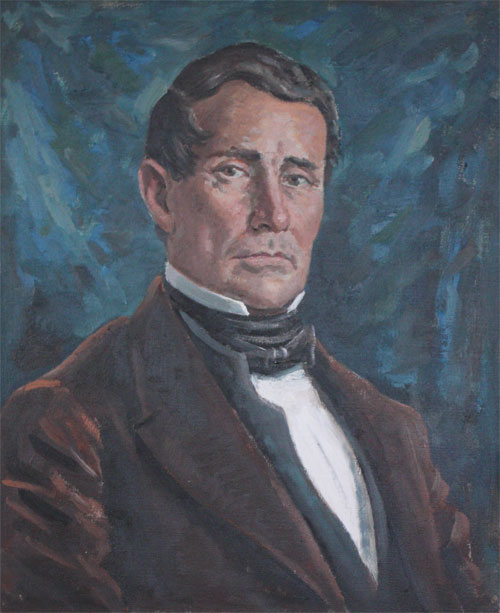

Fairbairn married Elizabeth (Eliza) Philip, daughter of John Philip on 24 May 1831. Fairbairn's wife, Eliza, died on 30 May 1840, four days after the birth of May Emma, at the age of twenty-eight. Fairbairn never remarried, and spent the remainder of his life as a widower.

Five children were born to Fairbairn and Eliza.

- Jane Agnes b. 1832. m. F.S. Watermeyer; the parents of Ben Watermeyer and several other MPs.
- John Philip b. 1834. Drowned in the Gamtoos River near Hankey in the Eastern Cape on 1 July 1845
- James Alexander b. 1836. m. Kate Lamb
  - John b. 1863. m. Winifred Difford d. 12 November 1925. Buried in St. Saviour's Church Cemetery, Claremont, Cape Town
    - John b.1912. m. Rozanne Robinson. Annexed Marion Island for South Africa in 1947 during Operation Snoektown
- Elizabeth Ann Wills (Eliza) b. 1838.
- May Emma b. and d. 1840.

As a widower, Fairbairn was responsible for the education of his children. Jane and Eliza were sent to a private school in Claremont, Mrs Rose's School for Ladies.

== Political career ==
=== The convict ship (1849-50) ===
The British Government made an attempt in 1849 to form a penal settlement at the Cape, but when the ship Neptune arrived at Simon's Bay, with 282 convicts aboard, the citizens protested and boycotted any persons or institutions having dealings with her. Fairbairn became Secretary of the "Anti-Convict Association" which formed in May 1849 under the leadership of Hercules Jarvis and other local leaders. Fairbairn led a radical faction however, which fought to ensure that no supplies whatsoever was obtainable, either for the convicts or for the troops.

A few months later, Fairbairn's actions caused the chairman and moderates of the Association to resign, and left Fairbairn for a while as the sole leader of the association in Cape Town. Riots and public disorder ensued.

During the riots, Fairbairn was even attacked and assaulted in his house at Sea Point by government thugs, who also wrecked his house. In the end the colonists were victorious, and on 21 February 1850, the Neptune set sail for Tasmania.

=== Fight for Representative Government (1850-1854) ===
Fairbairn was deeply involved in the struggle by the local Cape citizens to attain "Representative Government" in the form of an elected Parliament.

In 1850, Fairbairn was popularly elected to the small and relatively powerless "Legislative Council", together with three other local leaders. However, the governor Harry Smith added an additional, un-elected member, Fairbairn's old enemy the conservative Robert Godlonton, who favoured greater Imperial control over southern Africa. Conflict ensued, as Fairbairn (supported by the other elected or "popular" members) condemned the move and asked that the council be suspended until it could be re-constituted as a proper, fully elected and representative council. Fairbairn also argued against any property qualification for election (franchise qualifications were however the norm at the time). Eventually the four "popular members" published their "Eleven Reasons" for their protest, and resigned.

Encouraged by the Cape Town municipality, they met with other popularly elected leaders, and drew up a draft constitution ("The Sixteen Articles"). Fairbairn and Stockenstrom then travelled to London to get approval of the constitution, but was unsuccessful.

=== Member of the First Parliament (1854-1864) ===
When the Cape finally obtained a Parliament in 1854, Fairbairn was immediately elected as a member of the Assembly (lower house) representing Swellendam. He held this seat for ten years, up until his death in 1864.

He was initially proposed as Speaker of the first Parliament, but narrowly lost to Christoffel Brand. He was also an early supporter of the move for "responsible government" – the next step in the Cape's gradual independence, which entailed an elected Executive. Later, the first prime minister of the Cape Colony, John Molteno, hailed John Fairbairn as father of representative government and freedom of the press in the Cape.

== Death and legacy ==
In 1859 Fairbairn gave up his journalistic work and editorship of the Commercial Advertiser. His other contributions included the building of hard roads over the sands of the Cape flats, the first life-saving boat to operate around the Cape peninsula and the introducing of the Jury system.

However it is as a tireless fighter for press freedom that he is most remembered. His role as the leader of the free and liberal press of the Cape was taken over by Saul Solomon, and his newspaper the Cape Argus.

=== Death (1864) ===
Fairbairn died suddenly in Cape Town on 5 October 1864 at the Wynberg home of his son-in-law, advocate Frank Watermeyer, and was buried in the Somerset Road cemetery in Cape Town. Watermeyer died in the same year, having dutifully taken on Fairbairn's many debts.

Before the levelling of the Somerset Road Cemetery and building started on the site in about 1922, a number of inscribed stones were lifted from their graves and deposited at the Woltemade cemetery at Maitland which had been opened as Cape Town's principal graveyard in 1886. Here can be found the stones of John Fairbairn, his wife Elizabeth and other members of the Fairbairn and Philip families.

=== Descendants ===
In 1947 the British Government decided to give Marion Island and Prince Edward Island to South Africa, to prevent them falling into hostile hands. HMSAS Transvaal was dispatched in great secrecy, and on 4 January 1948, Lieutenant Commander John Fairbairn, great-grandson of John Fairbairn, landed on Prince Edward Island and claimed the islands for South Africa. The meteorological station is known as Fairbairn Settlement and is on Transvaal Cove.

In 2007, Fairbairn's great-great-great-granddaughter, Tessa Fairbairn, was awarded the Order of Simon of Cyrene. She was the head of St. Cyprian's School, a progressive girls' boarding and day school in Cape Town, South Africa for 17 years.

=== Recognition ===
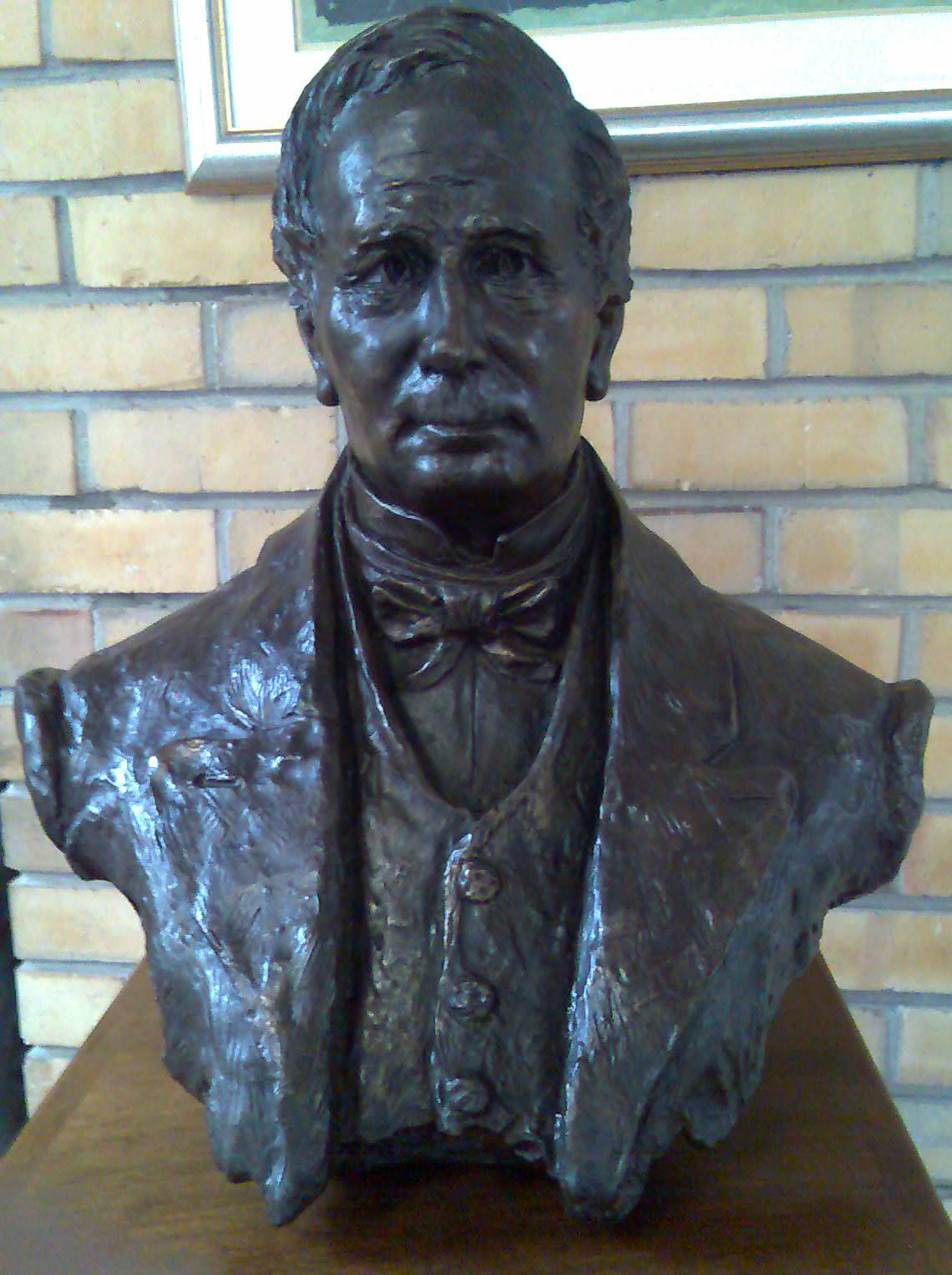
Bust in foyer of Fairbairn College

"Few men could have lived lives as full of worthwhile activity as John Fairbairn did. Few men could have got so little recognition from history".

When an English-medium co-educational high school was established in Goodwood, Cape Town in 1977, the School Governing Body decided to name it Fairbairn College.

Fairbairn Capital is an investment company within the Old Mutual group of companies. It was named after the founder of Old Mutual, John Fairbairn. According to the Fairbairn Capital website, in naming it Fairbairn Capital, "we recognise his contributions, draw on his heritage and laud his values".

Old Mutual International is based in Fairbairn House in St Peter Port on the island of Guernsey in the Channel Islands.

On 24 August 1994, the John Fairbairn boardroom was opened at the South African Chamber of Business parliamentary information centre in Cape Town by SA Chamber of Business director-general Mr Raymond Parsons. The boardroom together with the Rainbow Room was sponsored by Shell SA and Old Mutual and is used for meetings of businessmen and politicians.

== See also ==
- The South African Commercial Advertiser
