= Frederick Stephanus Watermeyer =

South African journalist and politician (1828–1864)

Fredrick Stephanus Watermeyer (14 April 1828 - 28 August 1864), informally known simply as "Fred" or "Frank", was a journalist, advocate and a prominent Member of the Cape Legislative Assembly.

== Early life ==
Born in Cape Town into a very educated Cape family, he was the younger brother of the great Ben Watermeyer. He was meticulously schooled as a child so that, although he was Afrikaans speaking, he was soon described as "one of such unmistakably English education as an old Kapenaar could possibly have."

He was already the secretary of a public company when he was still a teenager, and at a similar time was working as an actuary and was a free-lance writer. A free and critical thinker, he also authored anonymous papers critical of the state and the position of his own religious denomination, Lutheranism.

=== Legal career ===
Frank Watermeyer was among the first Cape advocates to be called to the bar after a purely local examination (instead of having to go to Europe). He was a member of the Council of the South African College and, shortly before his death, was elected as Chair of Law.

One of his more famous cases was his defense of the Khoi war hero Andries Botha in 1852. This saw him confront a vindictive Colonial Government in what was essentially a political show trial.

Another massively influential case was Long v. Robert Gray, Bishop of Cape Town (1861–63). Watermeyer's victory for William Long led to the downfall of the judicial basis of the Church of English in the various colonies of the British Empire.

In his final year he was involved in representing the heterodox Dutch Reformed Church clergyman Rev. J.J. Kotze, in an appeal against his suspension from the Church. However his sickness overcame him before the case was complete.

=== Journalism ===
After his early writings, Watermeyer was an owner or editor of several newspapers of the Cape Colony. He founded and edited the anti-government Cape of Good Hope Observer in January 1849, to fight the policies of the British Colonial Office during the Convict Crisis. The newspaper was also a fierce supporter of the liberal and tolerant frontier policies of Andries Stockenström.

Other newspapers he edited were Het Volksblad, the Cape Town Mail and The South African Commercial Advertiser (in 1850-51 while Fairbairn was in London).

== Cape Parliament (1858-1863) ==
Watermeyer had been an early supporter of the anti-government "popular party" since the 1850 Convict Crisis. This party, led by Frank Reitz, John Fairbairn, Andries Stockenström and Christoffel Brand, was involved in boycotting the British government plans for the Cape, in order to attain full representative government (i.e. an elected legislature).

He was elected to the Legislative Assembly of the Cape Parliament in 1858 and 1861. He was a liberal and an early supporter of responsible government (i.e. an elected executive) up until he lost his electoral seat in 1863. He was also known for being a strong supporter of the extension of higher education. He was famous as a brilliant and expressive public speaker.

== Family and early death ==
He married Jane Agnes Fairbairn, daughter of the educator, humanitarian and MP John Fairbairn. They had six children, none of whom married.

He was known as an exceptionally dutiful and compassionate man. From the time of his marriage, Watermeyer got highly involved in the financial difficulties of his charitable father-in-law. He eventually took on all of Fairbairn's debts. Already over-worked, he became sick and died in 1864, aged only 36 and relatively poor.

With other family members he was buried at Wynberg Cemetery.
