= Francis William Reitz Sr. =

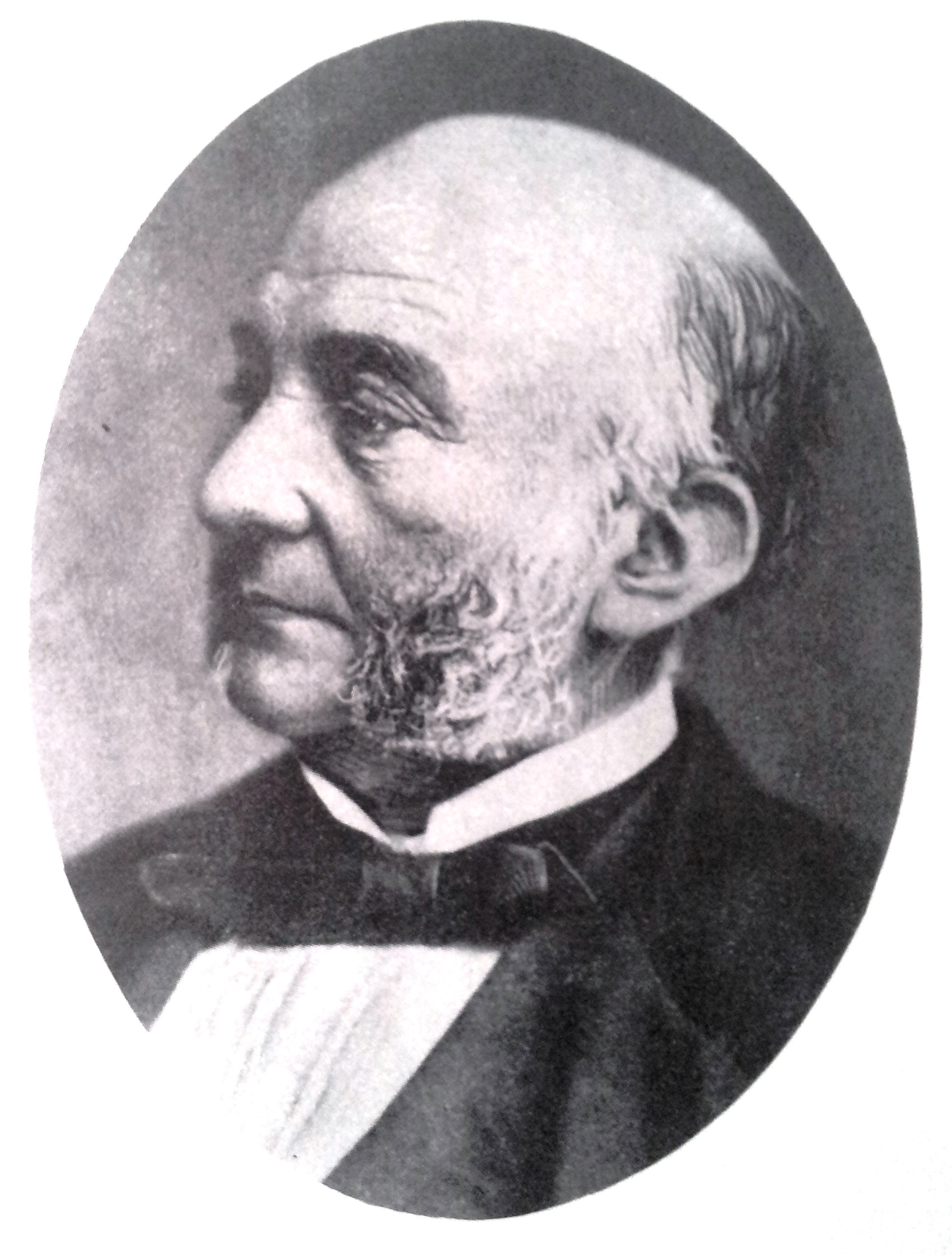
Frank Reitz in later life

Francis William Reitz Sr. MLC MLA (31 December 1810 – 26 June 1881) was an influential member of both houses of the Parliament of the Cape of Good Hope.

== Early life and farming ==
Generally known simply as "Frank Reitz", he was born at his family's home on the Heerengracht in Cape Town. He was baptised "Francis William" only after his parents' chosen name for him (François Guillaume) was rejected by the English Chaplain for sounding too French. He was schooled locally at the Riebeek Instituut, before studying agriculture in Scotland and travelling widely in Europe. He travelled and studied from Scotland to Italy and Germany, over several years, attaining a vast wealth of knowledge and experience - especially in the sciences.

Returning to the Cape, he started farming in 1835 at the farm Rhenosterfontein near Swellendam.

He was generally more theoretical than practical in his interests, but he was enormously influential in his writing of academic papers on farming as well as starting book clubs and agricultural societies. He also edited journals and gave lectures on agricultural topics, and remained the centre of organised Cape agriculture for most of the remainder of his life. When Jan Hendrik Hofmeyr (Onze Jan) founded Het Zuid-Afrikaansche Tijdschrift in 1878, Reitz was unsurprisingly invited to serve as co-editor.

Reitz was a close, like-long friend of Dr Henry White, the community's resident doctor who resided at the "Klein Huis" (the current farm dwelling) on Reitz's Rhenosterfontein estate and also served as a Member of Parliament. Dr White and Frank Reitz were described as a well-known, characterful duo, "lovably Dickensian in their ways and appearance", prone to "parish-pump preoccupation", and with a kindly, inclusive approach to all in the community.

== Political career ==
=== Conflict with the government ===
He was initially only attracted to politics due to the "Convict agitation" of 1849, where he represented communities of the Overberg region. He first served on the early, weak & nominal Legislative Council from 6 September 1850, when he was elected, together with Andries Stockenström, Christoffel Brand and John Fairbairn. The Governor Harry Smith however installed a puppet member, the pro-imperialist Robert Godlonton, as a means of influencing the council. The four "popular" members attempted to amend the constitution but, being obstructed, they resigned en masse, and drew up the famous "Sixteen Articles" as the proposed democratic constitution for the country. These were conveyed to London, and a long controversy ensued.

=== Legislative Council (1854-63) ===
When the Cape attained its first real parliament in 1854, Reitz was elected to represent the Western half of the country (which was at the time divided into two "Provinces"). He served for almost ten years.

He became a strong supporter of the "Voluntarist" movement (separation of Church & State) and of the "Responsible government" movement (greater democratic independence from Britain) - two allied movements led by Saul Solomon and John Molteno respectively. This made him a hated figure by the clergy and the imperialist establishment, and he gained a reputation as a radical. He was nonetheless extremely popular among ordinary voters of all races.

Financial set-backs caused him to withdraw from politics in 1863. He also sold his farm and moved to "Kliprivier" in Swellendam.

=== Legislative Assembly (1869-73) ===
He was an enormously popular and well-known figure in the Swellendam region, and he was consequently persuaded to stand for election for the Legislative Assembly (lower house), representing his Swellendam District. He continued his support for Voluntarism & Responsible Government, in the lower house now, until both movements finally triumphed. He was also known as a strong advocate for a country-wide irrigation system. He was not a confident public speaker though, and greatly disliked political debates.

Upon the successful attainment of Responsible Government, he retired from politics for the second time. He was an extremely popular figure in parliament and his colleagues offered him a title "Gentleman Usher of the Black Rod" so that he would be able to remain in contact and involved in parliament, even without having political power.

== Character and family ==
He was described as a studious and scholarly man with extremely broad, liberal and tolerant views, on everything from religion to race.

In 1832 he had married Cornelia Deneys, and the couple had 12 children. His son, Francis William Reitz Jr., was an influential politician and later President of the Orange Free State.
