= Joseph Vintcent Sr =

Joseph Vintcent MLC
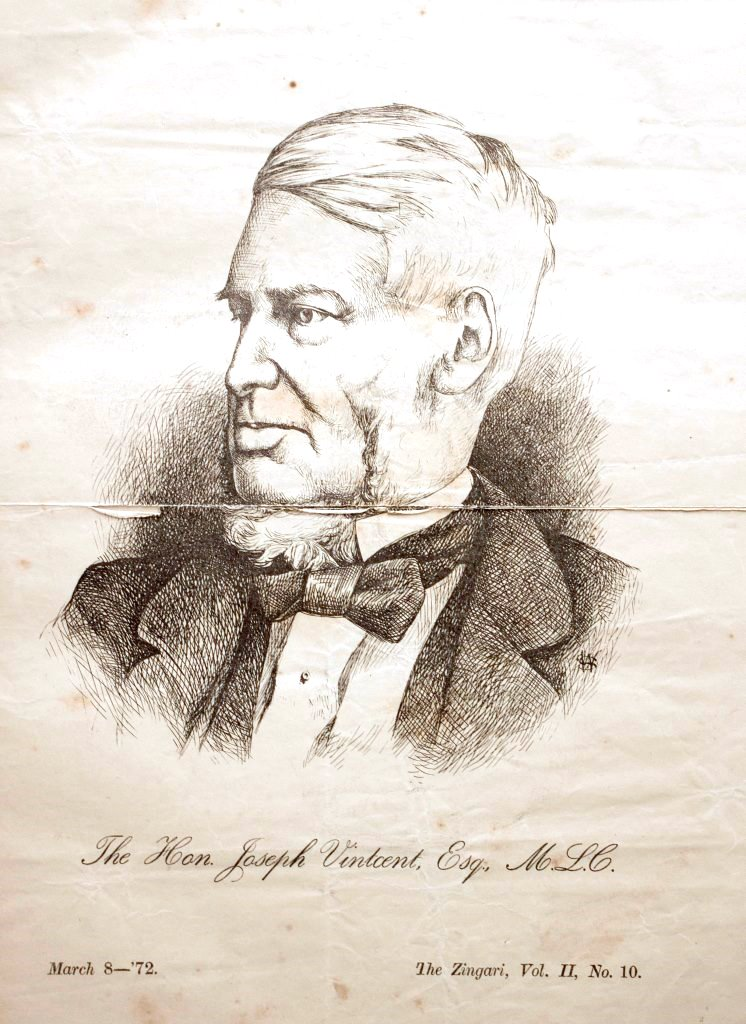
- Joseph Vintcent, MLC. A sketch from only a few months before he died.

Joseph Johannis Vintcent MLC (8 November 1809 - 26 December 1873) was a member of the Legislative Council (upper house) of the Parliament of the Cape of Good Hope.

== Career ==
Born in The Hague, Netherlands, as the son of Lodewijk Vincent and Esther Philippine Leuliet, he became a book keeper at the cadastre in his hometown before 1836. Vintcent emigrated to the Cape Colony in 1844 and became a farmer. He was elected to the Legislative Council, where he was a keen supporter of responsible government (democratic self-rule), voluntaryism (separation of church & state), and of public works expansion.

When responsible government was attained in 1872, the new Prime Minister John Molteno offered Vintcent the position of Treasurer General. Vintcent declined due to ill-health however, and the position was then offered to Dr Henry White. Vintcent died the next year in 1873.

== Family ==
Vintcent married Maria Catharina van Rijssen in 1836 in The Hague. They had a large family. His son Lewis Anthony Vintcent (1837-1894) became a prominent Cape Town merchant and liberal Member of the Legislative Assembly for George (1874-1894). His daughter Agnes Josephine Hester Vintcent married MLA John X. Merriman. Another of his family was Charles Vintcent the cricketer, and Charles' son Nevill Vintcent the aviator.

Sir Joseph Vintcent Jnr. (12 Nov 1861 – 4 Aug 1914) appeared in the 1881 FA Cup Final and was Advocate of the Supreme Court of the Cape Colony, Crown Prosecutor of British Bechuanaland (1886–94), Judge of the High Court of Matabeleland (1894–8), Senior Judge of the High Court of South Rhodesia (1898–1914), and was knighted in 1910.
