= Henry White (Cape Treasurer General) =

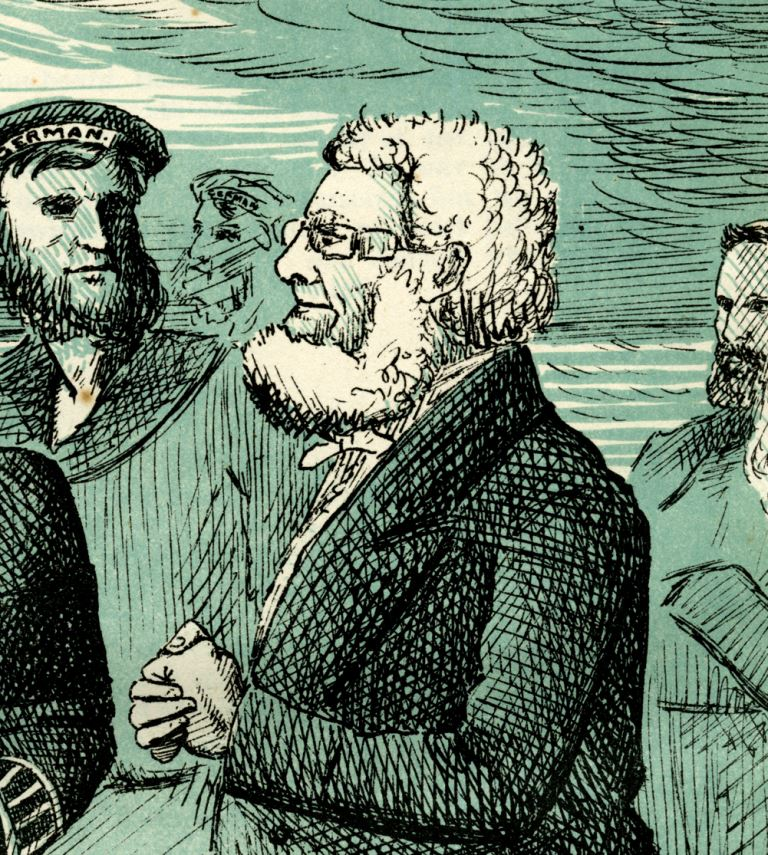
Dr Henry White, from a caricature in the Lantern newspaper, October 1877.

Dr Henry White, M.L.C. (17 April 1813 – 9 December 1894) was a Member of Parliament and Treasurer General of the Cape Colony.

== Personal life and early career ==
Born in Pamplemousses, Mauritius on 17 April 1813, his father was John White born in Dover, Kent his mother: Josephine Elizabeth Mabille born in Mauritius; White emigrated to the Cape when he was still young. He completed his studies at The Royal College of Surgeons, Lincoln's Inn Fields, London, obtaining his licence on 20 October 1834. Returning to the Cape, he became District Surgeon for Swellendam. He was effectively the Doctor for the Overberg region of the Cape, for the next twenty years.

Dr White retired from his medical work in 1857, and invested his savings in setting up as a farmer on the Breede River nearby. His farm, which he named "The Retreat", comprised the modern Napkys Mond and Michielskraal properties, and he built a house which was later washed away by floods in 1902. He introduced the reaping machine to South Africa. He had earlier also introduced Angora goats to the Overberg and Karoo districts, but it was only in the Eastern Cape that they were a true success. He was also for many years involved in a project to begin exporting goat manure to his place of birth, Mauritius. Three years after setting up however, he abandoned and sold all his farms.

A close like-long friend of Frank Reitz MLC, Dr White moved into the "Klein Huis" (the current farm dwelling) on Reitz's Rhenosterfontein estate outside Swellendam where he was the community's resident Doctor.

For many years, Dr. White and Frank Reitz were constant associates. The pair was recognized for their distinct appearance and scholarly interests, often focusing on local affairs while maintaining a welcoming attitude toward community members.

== Political career ==
Dr White was renowned as being a stickler for detail, and a defining characteristic of White's political career was his lifelong preoccupation with efficiency and accountability in government. His disadvantage was that he did not possess the full flair and charisma of a typical political leader.

=== Legislative Assembly (1860-1870) ===
In 1860, Dr White joined John Fairbairn as MLA for Swellendam, but lost the next election in 1864 to JZ Human; and also lost the Legislative Council election to Henry Thomas Vigne. He was then asked to stand for Riversdale and was elected by that appreciative constituency in 1869. (In the same 1869 election his friend Reitz avenged White's 1864 defeat by toppling Human as MLA for Swellendam)

He was a strong critic of financial mismanagement by the Colonial Office during his early career in the Legislative Council of the Cape's first parliament. For similar reasons, he was an advocate of Responsible government (democratic self-rule) for the Cape Colony. By making the Cape's Executive directly "responsible" to the electorate and Parliament, he believed that this form of government would favour honesty and accountability.

=== Legislative Council (1870-1878) ===
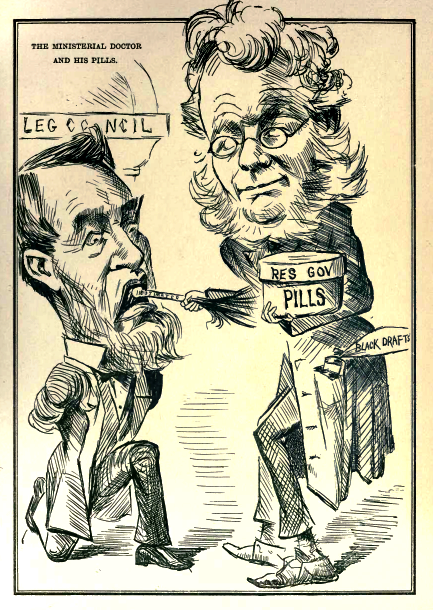
Caricature of Dr White administering responsible government pills and "black drafts" to the reluctant Legislative Council.

In 1870, Dr White moved to Cape Town, and settled at 2 Hof Street, Gardens. This was in the same year that he was elevated to the upper house, the Legislative Council, to represent the Western Province of the Cape Colony.

His elevation to the Legislative Council was significant, as it gave the responsible government movement and its leader John Molteno its strongest foothold in the conservative upper house. In the same capacity he also gave his support in the upper house to the allied voluntaryism (separation of church and state) movement of Saul Solomon.

==== Treasurer General for the Cape Colony (1872-1878) ====
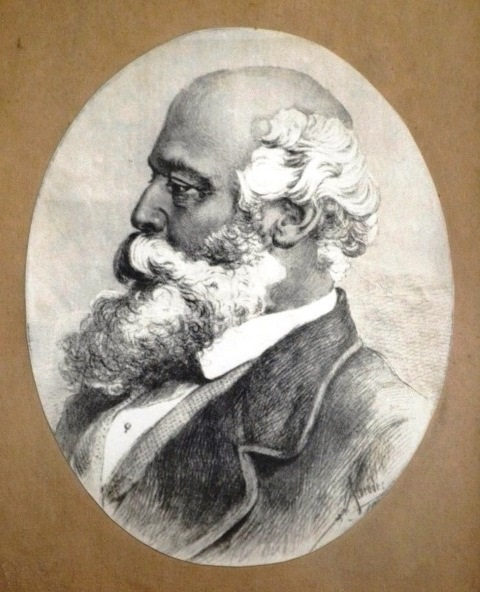
John Molteno, 1st Cape Prime Minister

Dr White was appointed Treasurer General of the Cape Colony by Prime Minister John Molteno, when he formed the Cape's first elected government in 1872. Molteno had initially offered the position to the Joseph Vintcent MLC, but upon his declining the position, had invited Dr White. Molteno appointed White on account of the latter's impeccable reputation for honesty, dedication and financial competence, however Molteno also considered it prudent to have on the cabinet a representative of the Cape's Legislative Council, and White conveniently fulfilled that criterion too.

White had to work especially closely with Molteno, as the Premier performed a large portion of the Treasurer's work, drew up and presented the budgets, and generally kept an exceedingly close eye on the country's finances.

Some contemporary critics, such as "Onze Jan" Hofmeyr, accused Molteno of running a "one-man Cabinet" because his colleagues' work in government seemed peripheral at best, leaving an impression that the Prime Minister was running the country alone. By the same source, White is accused of being little more than an amiable secretary figure to the Prime Minister. In fact, the government's intention had been to double the attention to the country's finances; so while the Prime Minister did perform the role of Treasurer, it altered the role, but did not diminish the importance of Dr White's work.

In spite of such critics, White was repeatedly hailed for his role in the economic boom over which he presided. He oversaw an unprecedented expansion in government spending on infrastructure, a corresponding growth in exports, and significant budget surpluses, even though taxes as a whole were generally cut.

Various anecdotes exist of Dr White's naive good-nature in politics. Edmund Burrows wrote of Jock Paterson, an especially confrontational member of the opposition, in a crescendo of an impassioned speech, asking, as a rhetorical question, what the basis for the governments accounts were: "... when Paterson repeated the question, Molteno could restrain (White) no longer: "Debit and credit!", he beamed through his spectacles to Paterson opposite, and brought the house down."

==== Resignation and the Confederation Wars (1878) ====
The increased involvement of the Colonial Office in the affairs of the Cape Colony, that came about due to Carnarvon's disastrous Confederation scheme, led to a string of destructive wars across southern Africa which inevitably pulled in the Cape Colony.

White was deeply involved in questioning the legality of the Colonial Office's moves into southern Africa, and criticising imperial attempts to force the Cape Colony to finance these invasions of its neighbouring states. White even went so far as to refuse any communication with the Colonial Office that did not go through Molteno's office.

In early 1878, Sir Henry Bartle Frere overthrew the Cape's elected government, and assumed full military control of the country, but asked White to stay on to keep government running. However, White responded by immediately tendering his resignation, typically handing it to his parliamentary colleague Stockenstrom, and refusing even to communicate with Bartle Frer.

== Cape Town Municipality ==
In later life he settled permanently in Cape Town, to retire where many of his friends now lived.

He soon came to be pulled into Cape Town municipal elections, where he supported the local ratepayers party (dubbed by its enemies, the "Dirty Party") consisting mainly of the Afrikaans-speaking Cape Town residents of various backgrounds and income brackets.

They fought a party which was composed predominantly of recent immigrant English merchants and businessmen, who favoured a cleaner, gentrified city. This party proposed higher rates, with greater infrastructure to encourage investment, and called itself the "Clean Party".

Dr White's so-called "Dirty Party" (actually led by JC Hofmeyr, M.J. Louw and Alwyn Zoutendyk), being composed mainly of property owners, both large and small, from the Afrikaner, Coloured and Malay communities, were less afraid of the dirty streets than of being pushed out of areas of the city by the higher rates which would be needed in order to pay for the proposed new infrastructure.

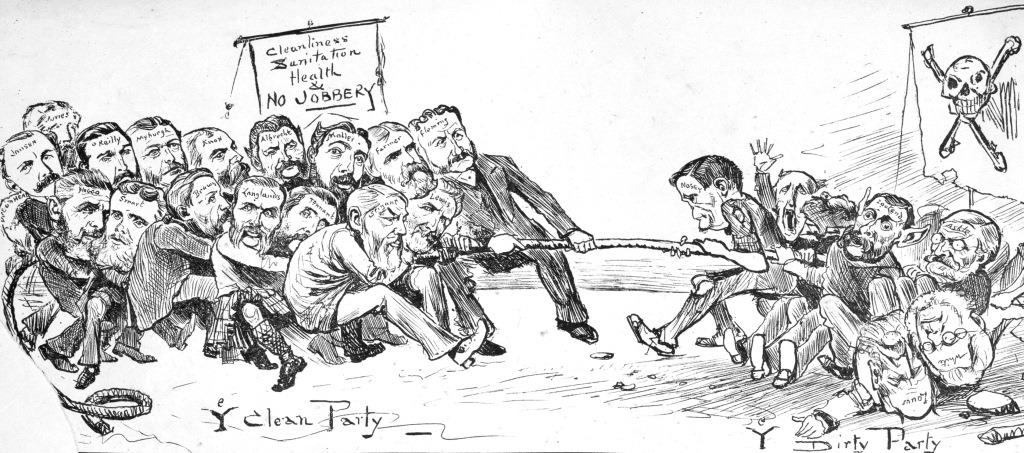
A Lantern cartoon attacking the so-called "Dirty party". White appears in the far right.

Henry White was married 3 June 1834 in Saint Dunstan in The West, London, England to Frances Brown of the Parish of Saint Pancras, Middlesex.

He attended The Royal College of Surgeons of London 35-43 Lincoln's Inn Fields, London WC2A 3PN he gained membership in that college 18 April 1834, obtaining his licence on 20 October 1834.

Dr White died, aged 81 years 7 months on 9 December 1894. At his residence 2 Hofstreet Gardens, Cape Town, South Africa his wife Frances died 13 August 1899.

His lifelong companion Frank Reitz had died in 1881, but Dr White spent his final years caring for Reitz's remaining elderly relatives in Cape Town.
