= Richard William Murray =

South African businessperson (1819–1908)

Richard William Murray, Snr
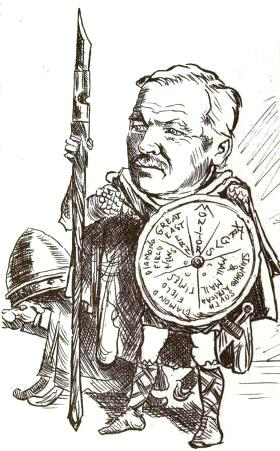
- Caricature of Murray
- Born: 1819; London, England
- Died: 1908 (aged 88–89)
- Occupation: Newspaper editor
- Years active: 1856–1862
- Employers: Cape Argus (1856–1862); Great Eastern (1863–1866)
- Notable work: Pen and Ink Sketches in Parliament (1864), Diamond Fields Keepsake (1873), The Milners, Or, The River Diggings: A Story of South African Life (1891), South African Reminiscences (1894).
- Spouse: Letitia Murray
- Children: 3

Richard William Murray Sr. (1819 – 1908) was a journalist, editor, newspaper proprietor and politician of the Cape Colony.

He was a lifelong supporter of British imperial expansion, and used the name "Limner" in most of his writings.

== Cape Monitor (1854–1856) ==
Murray was born in London in 1819. In his youth, Murray worked for several newspapers in London, before he arrived in Cape Town in 1854 and immediately began work as editor of the reactionary Cape Monitor.

In this capacity, he attended and reported on the early sessions of the new Cape Parliament as one of two observer newspapers (the other being the liberal Commercial Advertiser and Mail). He quickly acquired a reputation for enormous personal and political bias, predominantly against any form of local government. In a strange turn of affairs, the editor of the competing Commercial Advertiser and Mail was also an elected MP in the parliament and Murray's reporting on Fairbairn was notorious for its vitriol. He was also one of the leading journalistic attackers of the speaker Christoffel Brand and the MP Saul Solomon. He compiled a large number of sketches and reminiscences that provide a large portion of the early history of the Cape Parliament.

== Cape Argus (1856–1862) ==
He founded the Cape Argus, with Bryan Henry Darnell and Saul Solomon, in 1856. However he and Darnell swiftly became relatively unpopular, as their fiercely pro-imperialist political views antagonised the Cape public, who were predominantly supportive of "Responsible Government" (locally elected democracy) and its leader John Molteno. Darnell and Murray therefore left the Cape Argus (in 1859 and 1862 respectively), with Saul Solomon taking over and bringing the paper into accord with public opinion and into a period of enormous growth.

== The Great Eastern (1863–1866) ==
The Eastern part of the Cape Colony was traditionally far more pro-imperialist in its politics, and the British Governor Philip Wodehouse moved there to garner support against the growing Responsible Government movement. He took Murray with him for media support, and Murray started the Great Eastern newspaper to support the pro-imperialist party accordingly.

He also briefly stood for the constituency of Cradock in 1865, in the Cape Parliament.

However, in the ensuing parliamentary sessions, Molteno's Responsible Government party outmaneuvered the Governor's party and its Eastern Cape supporters, and the Government was forced to return to Cape Town. The Great Eastern also faltered and eventually was forced to close in September 1866.

In an unusual turn of events, this paper was later re-opened by new owners as The Eastern Star but in fact came to be taken over by the Cape Argus which Murray had originally left in Cape Town. It eventually moved to Johannesburg.

== Griqualand West (1866–1908) ==
In 1866 Murray returned to Cape Town, where he briefly edited the Standard and Mail. However he left for Griqualand West in the same year, and settled down in what is now Kimberley. He had a great interest in mining, and the great diamond rush was at the time underway.

There, he edited the pro-British publication Diamond News, which he used to attempt to prevent a similar movement for self-government appearing in Griqualand West. In this aim, it was squarely opposed to the pre-existing Diamond Field paper of Alfred Aylward.

In 1884, the new Diamond Times newspaper opened, with Murray as editor. While officially owned by a "Woolf Joel", the paper was in fact owned and directed by the diamond magnate Barney Barnato. It was therefore used for public attacks on Barnato's opponents. This brought it into conflict with Cecil Rhodes, who was at the time taking over control of the diamond fields from Barnato. Soon afterwards, Murray returned to Cape Town.

== Family ==
He married Letitia Murray (d.1886) from Bristol, and they had three children (Richard William Murray Jr., C. H. Murray and Frank Murray).

His son, Richard William Murray Jr., was later to return to Cape Town and take over editing the Standard and Mail. In 1876, he also founded the Cape Times together with editor Frederick York St Leger and several other partners. While still sympathetic to British imperialism, Murray Jnr. was a great deal more moderate in their expression than his father, and was accordingly more popular with the local readership of these publications.
