= Convict crisis =

Cape Colony protest

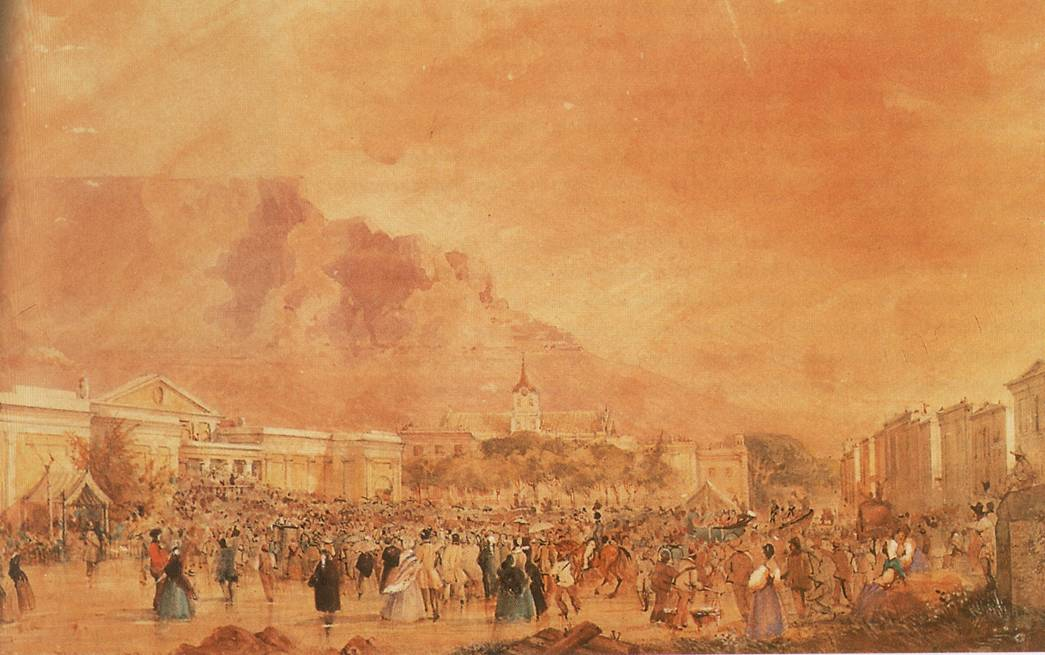
- Crowds gather in Cape Town to hear speeches and rally against the landing of convicts at the Cape (4 July 1849).
- Date: 4 July 1849 - February 1850
- Location: Cape Town and surrounding coast of the Cape Colony
- Caused by: Prospect of convict colonisation Official indifference to public opinion Arrival of The Neptune
- Goals: Prevent the landing of convicts on board The Neptune; Prevent the Cape from being added as a deportation destination for convicts
- Methods: Petitions; Demonstrations; Boycotts; Looting; Civil disobedience; Vandalism; Assault
- Result: Convicts prevented from landing Cape not listed as a destination for convicts Strengthening of the movement for self government

Lead figures
Home Secretary Sir George Grey; Governor Sir Harry Smith	John Fairbairn; John Bardwell Ebden; Hercules Crosse Jarvis; William Porter

The Convict crisis, also known as the "Anti-convict demonstrations" or "Anti-convict agitation" or "Cape Town anti-convict petition", was a period of civil unrest and protesting, lasting from 4 July 1849 to February 1850, in the Cape Colony. It was caused by the prospect of the British authorities making the Cape Colony a penal colony and was triggered by the arrival off the coast of Cape Town of a ship, The Neptune, carrying 288 ticket-of-leave convicts from Ireland. The event was important in forming a distinct political identity in the Cape and strengthening the movement for self government.

== Background ==
Starting in 1841 the British government began suggesting that the Cape Colony be used as a penal colony in a policy similar to the policy of transporting convicts to Australia between 1788 and 1868.

Stronger proposals were again proposed on 7 August 1847 with the then Home Secretary, Sir George Grey, issuing a public dispatch to the Governor of the Cape Colony, Sir Harry Smith suggesting that the law on penal transport provisions be modified to include the Cape Colony as a destination for convicts; with the added suggestion that ticket-of-leave convicts might be a useful addition to the colony given its shortage of labour at the time. Sir Grey also requested that Governor Smith gauge local public opinion on the proposal. The proposal was made in the context of British efforts to alleviate the Great Famine of Ireland whilst also trying to subdue the Irish rebellion of 1848 and declining support for the practice in Australia.

The proposals caused widespread concern in the Cape Colony which at the time was regarded as relatively peaceful despite frequent conflicts with the amaXhosa on the colony's eastern frontier. It was made at a time when the responsible government movement was gaining momentum in the Cape. The presence of convicts was seen in the Cape as counterproductive to their efforts as advocating for responsible government for the colony in London. The hostile local reaction resulted in a number of petitions against the scheme being sent back to the Home Secretary in reply.

However Grey did not wait for a response on the proposal before sending The Neptune to land convicts in the Cape and Bermuda.

== Crisis ==
In March 1849 the Cape Town newspaper ‘Commercial Advertizer’ published news of The Neptune's expected arrival and purpose, which was confirmed by Governor Smith after he had received official dispatches about the new scheme. This news greatly angered the local population who felt that their strong opposition to the proposal had been ignored. It triggered a second, more intense, wave of protest actions, civil disobedience and promises of boycotts. Multiple councilors and notable business people who were involved in discussions to supply the ship were attacked and had their property looted and destroyed by angry mobs.

=== July protests ===
On 4 July 1849 a large multi-racial, multi-ethnic crowd gathered outside the Commercial Exchange on Heerengracht Street in Cape Town. It was estimated that the crowd numbered over 5,000 Capetonians, perhaps as many as a quarter of the city's roughly 20,000 strong population at the time. Petitions were signed against the proposal and sent to Queen Victoria, a pledge was signed not to receive or employ any convicts, and an Anti-Convict Committee was formed. John Fairbairn was elected as the Anti-Convict Committee's secretary, he was later assaulted in his Green Point home, allegedly by government agents.

=== Embargo ===
When the ship arrived off the coast of Cape Town on 19 September 1849 local officials refused to allow anyone to disembark from the vessel or for the vessel to receive any supplies, local government institutions were also ordered not to sell any provisions to the ship or convicts onboard. Among the prisoners onboard was the Irish nationalist and revolutionary John Mitchel.

After being refused disembarkment and supply by the people of Cape Town, The Neptune sailed to nearby Simon’s Bay. The situation became desperate when Governor Smith ordered a local businessman and British army captain, Robert Stanford, to provide provisions to the ship causing a standoff. Although Stanford complied with the order it damaged the legitimacy of the local government whilst Captain Stanford was banned and boycotted by the general public. When Stanford's daughter fell ill no doctors would see her; upon her death from the illness Stanford left the Cape for Britain.

In February 1850, after a 5 month long standoff, The Neptune sailed on to Van Diemen’s Land in Australia. This period severely tested the Cape Peninsula Urban Police as they had to deal with many incidents of public violence and unrest.

== Legacy ==
The issue was finally resolved when British MP Charles Adderley removed the possibility of the Cape becoming a penal colony in the British parliament. In recognition the street in front of the Commercial Exchange where the 4 July 1849 demonstration took place, Heerengracht Street, was renamed Adderley Street.

The protests resulted in a decline in the popularity of the pro-British local publication, the African Journal. The political unity the crisis produced resulted in it becoming an important event in the development of the Cape's growing independence from Great Britain. Fueling the movement for responsible government that would result the establishment of the Cape Parliament in 1853 and in self government in 1872.
