= Neptune (1815 ship) =

History

United Kingdom
- Name: Neptune
- Owner: Initially: Hook & Co.; 1819: Boehm & Co.; 1820: Davidson & Co.; 1827: John Altham Cumberledge; 1837: Thacker & Co., London; 1839: Mangles & Co., London; 1847: Gray & Co., London; 1848: J. & F. Somes, London; 1853: F.W. Green, London
- Builder: Kyd & Co., Kidderpore, Calcutta
- Laid down: 1814
- Launched: 12 April 1815
- Fate: Sold for use as a hulk in 1860

General characteristics
- Tons burthen: 513, or 537, or 540, or 555, or 643, or 644, or 64422/94 (bm)
- Length: 118 ft 9 in (36.2 m)
- Beam: 32 ft 8 in (10.0 m)
- Propulsion: Sail

Neptune was a merchant ship built at Calcutta, British India in 1815. The British East India Company (EIC) chartered Neptune for one voyage. Later, she made two voyages transporting convicts from England to Australia. During one of those voyages she was notably involved in the Convict Crisis off the Cape coast in 1849. She was sold as a hulk in 1860.

== Career ==
Neptune cost 150,000 rupees to build. She first appeared in Lloyd's Register in 1816 with Innerarity, master, Hook & Co., owners, and trade London–Bengal, suggesting that she had taken on British registry and was sailing to Bengal under a license from the EIC. (The Register of Shipping showed her master's name as Inveriety.)

In 1819 Neptune's master changed from Innerarity to R. Low, and her owner from Hook & Co. to Robinson. The Register of Shipping for 1820 showed Neptune with Lowe, master, Davidson & Co. owner, and trade Liverpool—Calcutta.

In December 1823 her owners sold Neptune for a "Free Trader".

On her one voyage for the EIC she left Portsmouth on 6 July 1827 under the command of Captain John Altham Cumberlege, Jr., bound for Bengal. She reached Bombay on 26 October, Mangalore on 15 November, Saugor on 27 December, and arrived at Calcutta on 2 January 1828. On her return voyage she passed Kedgeree on 14 February, reached Madras on 3 March and St Helena on 18 May, and arrived at the Downs on 12 July.

On her first convict voyage, under the command of William Ferris and surgeon Joseph Steret, she departed Sheerness on 7 October 1837 and arrived in Hobart on 18 January 1838. She transported 200 male convicts, three of whom died en route.

Neptune sailed from Cork, Ireland, on 26 October 1843, still under the command of William Ferris, and with 308 bounty emigrants aboard. She arrived in Sydney on 11 February 1844 and was placed in quarantine for three days on arrival due to smallpox. Ten people died during the voyage.

In 1849 Neptune attempted to deliver 288 convicts to the Cape Colony to start a new penal settlement in South Africa. The free settlers already there vigorously opposed the idea and it was eventually abandoned.

On her second convict voyage, under the command of John Henderson and with surgeon Thomas Gibson, she departed England in January 1850. Calling at Bermuda colony she took on further convicts before departing for the Cape where popular feeling against the prospect of becoming a penal colony resulted in boycotting and protests, thereby preventing the landing of her convicts and she eventually arrived in Hobart on 5 April 1850. (Note: Henderson, who was born in 1795, received his second class master's certificate on 21 September 1848 at Trinity House, London. At the time he was already serving on Neptune.) She transported 300 male convicts, and disembarked 282 at Hobart.

Year	Master	Owner	Trade	Source & notes
1850	Henderson	J&F Somes	London	LR; small repair 1848
1855	Henderson	FW Green	London	LR; small repairs 1853
1859	L.Fillan	FW Green	Bristol–India	LR; small repairs 1855

== Fate ==
Neptune does not appear in the 1860 volume of Lloyd's Register. She was sold in 1860 for use as a hulk.
