= Egidius Benedictus Watermeyer =

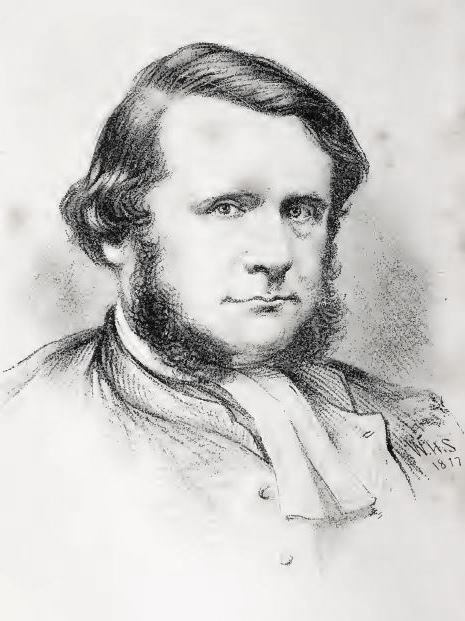
Ben Watermeyer, from a posthumous sketch in 1877.

Egidius Benedictus Watermeyer (21 August 1824 - 21 September 1867), informally known simply as "Ben", was a Judge and a founding Member of the Cape Legislative Assembly.

== Early life ==
Ben Watermeyer was born into a Cape family of German ancestry (his grandfather was originally from Hamburg). He was the second son of Frederick Stephanus Watermeyer Snr (1797-1847), and Anna Maria Ziervogel. He was a quiet and studious child, who even as a small child was able to correspond with his older brother in Classical Greek. He read law, went to study Civil Law in the Netherlands in 1841, and was called to the bar at the Inner Temple in London in 1847.

In the same year in 1847, he returned to the Cape Colony and was admitted as an Advocate at the Supreme Court. An un-ostentatious but extremely hard-working man, Watermeyer partook in most of the important cases in the late 1840s and gained an extremely detailed knowledge of southern Africa by working the circuit courts.

He married Johanna Catharina Henrietta Reitz (niece of Frederick William Reitz Snr.) The marriage was childless but exceptionally happy.

== Member of Parliament (1854-5) ==
When the Cape attained its first Parliament in 1854, several Districts requested him to stand as an MP, and he agreed eventually to stand for the District which had asked first - Worcester. He missed the first session (being on circuit) but immediately on taking his seat, he joined the liberal anti-government party of Saul Solomon, William Porter, John Molteno and John Fairbairn (whom he greatly admired). With several of these colleagues, he helped frame the Standing Rules and Orders of the house. He was one of the Members of Parliament who supported the first (unsuccessful) attempt to institute "responsible government" in 1855.

Though he only served for one year, until 1855, he was enormously influential. In spite of his mild speech impediment, his speeches were enormously respected and, without exception, carried the house on the debate at hand. An introverted man, he was chiefly noted for his broad-minded, inclusive approach to politics.

He retired from politics in 1855, though two of his relatives were to serve in the house shortly afterwards: Frederick Stephanus Watermeyer and Philip Johannes Andries Watermeyer.

== Later life ==
Even in his early career, he typically pursued several concurrent lines of work and study. His interest in the language, culture and history of the early Khoi people was especially strong. It was in law however, that he was chiefly known.

He was subsequently appointed a Judge.

He established and chaired the Board of Examiners that went on to provide the basis for the University of the Cape of Good Hope that was founded in 1874. He produced a huge amount of writings in his short life.

Ben Watermeyer died young and grief-stricken in 1867, aged only 43. He had been greatly affected by the death of his brother Frank in 1864, and then the death of his wife the very next year in 1865.

The Dictionary of National Biography devotes a paragraph to laud his modest kindness, empathy, reasoning powers and his vast reserve of patience. These qualities, together with his gentle sense of humour, made him one of the most loved of the Cape's public figures at the time.
