= The South African Commercial Advertiser =

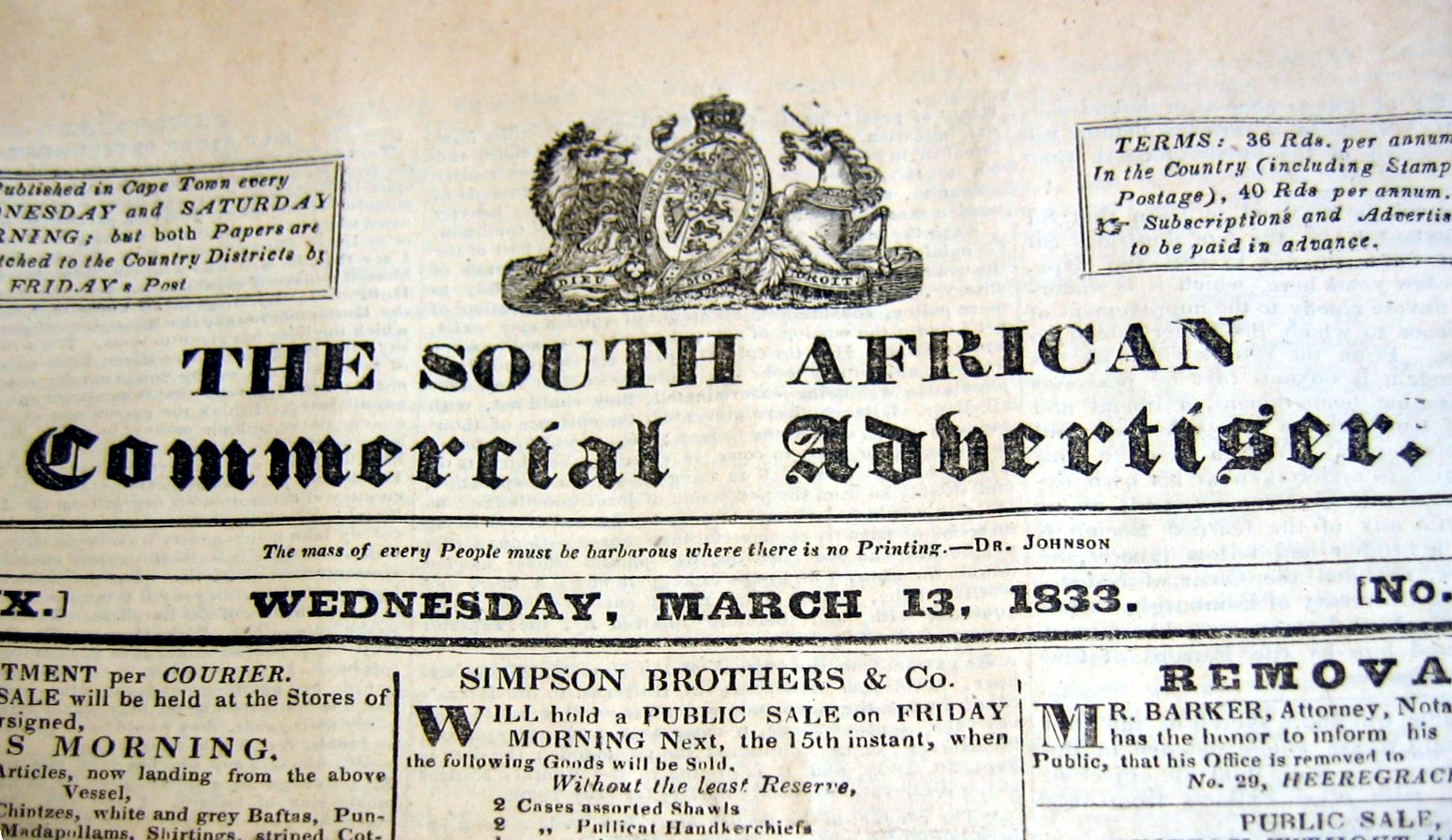

The South African Commercial Advertiser was South Africa's first independent newspaper and started publication in Cape Town on 7 January 1824. It was banned between 5 May 1824 and 31 August 1825, and between 10 March 1827 and 3 October 1828, by order of the Governor at the Cape, Lord Charles Somerset.

On its founding, the paper was edited by the two Scotsmen, the poet Thomas Pringle and the educator John Fairbairn, and was printed by George Greig. After a series of mergers and name changes it finally ceased publication in 1879. The paper's final name was The Cape Standard and Mail.

== Censorship and banning (1824-29) ==
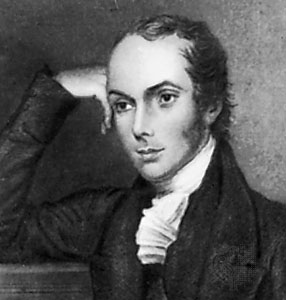
Co-editor Thomas Pringle

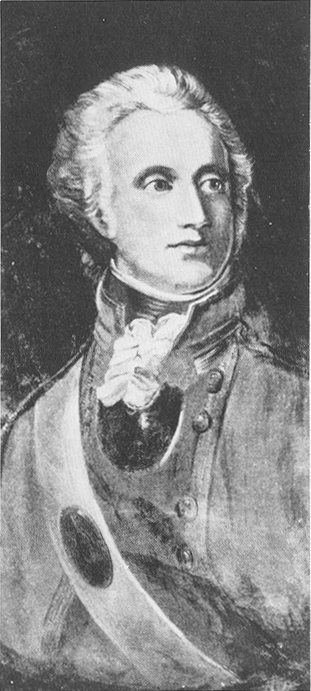
Autocratic Governor, Lord Charles Somerset

Before 1824, the only permitted news publication had been that of the weekly Government Gazette. The authorities had emphasized their aversion to a free press by seizing printing equipment found on board the "Chapman", an 1820 Settlers ship.

Governor Somerset's banning of the paper, only a few months after its founding, followed on his earlier decree that The South African Commercial Advertiser would have to submit to censorship before printing and distribution. In March 1824 Pringle had printed details of a libel suit against a Cape solicitor, William Edwards, who had accused the Governor of abuse of his powers. The autocratic Somerset also ordered Greig to deposit 10 000 Rixdollars with the Fiscal as security in case he should publish anything unacceptable. In the face of the government pressure, Pringle resigned later in 1824, and left the country to return to Britain. However Fairbairn and Greig continued the struggle. Greig sailed to England and obtained authorisation to publish free from Colonial Government censorship, resuming publication on 31 August 1825. Ordinance 60 of 1829 finally guaranteed freedom of the Cape press.

== The Paper under Fairbairn (1824-1864) ==
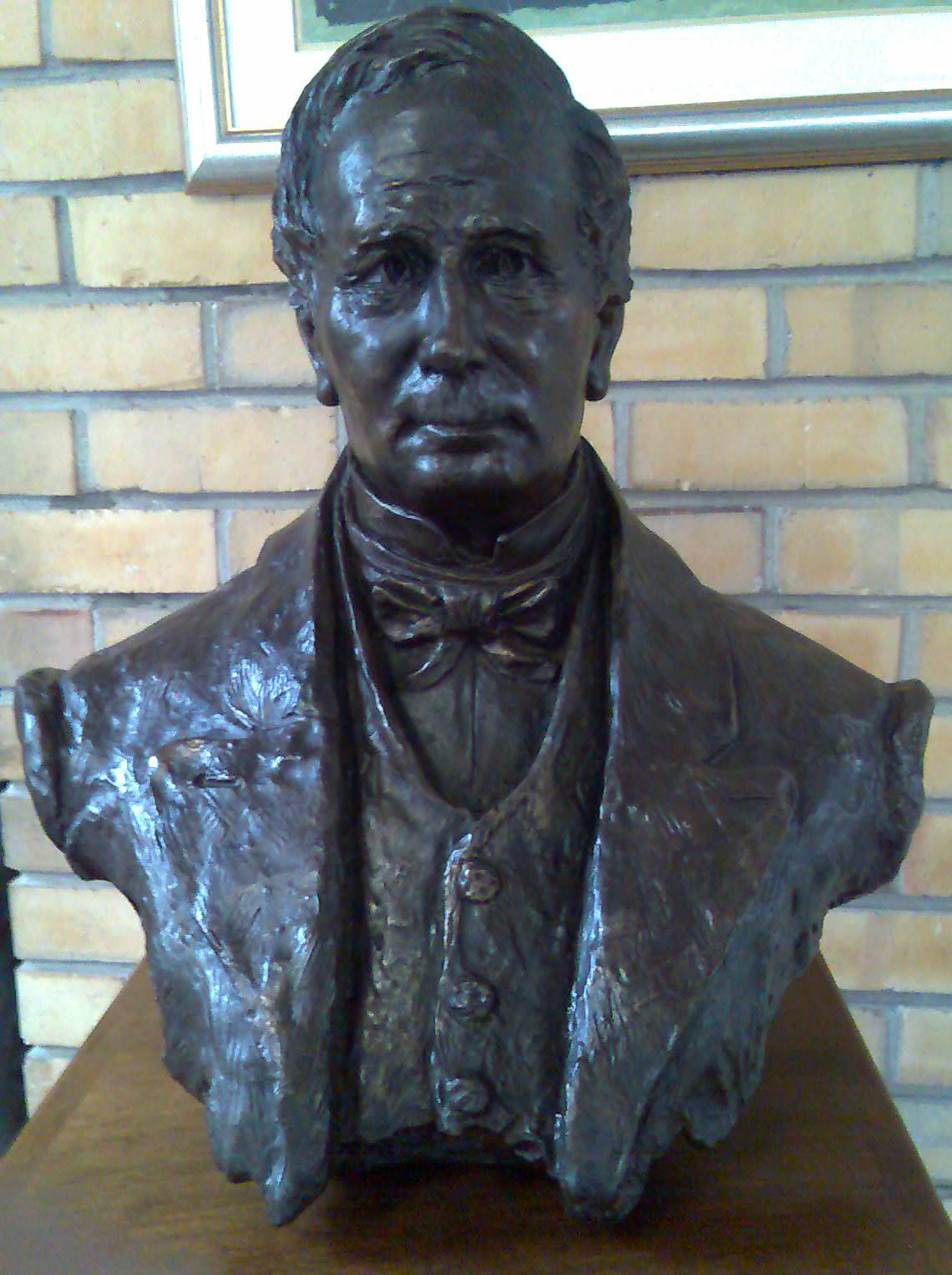
John Fairbairn

John Fairbairn, now the paper's sole editor, led the publication to become a powerful voice for greater democracy in the Cape Colony. For the next 40 years, it dominated the Cape's media.

Fairbairn was a strong supporter of the multi-racial Cape franchise and for expanded rights for Black citizens of the Cape. Under Fairbairn's control, the paper also led opposition against the Anti-Convict Movement, and became a strong supporter of the growing movement for "Responsible Government" (democratically accountable government). Later, the first Prime Minister of the Cape Colony, John Molteno, hailed Fairbairn as father of representative government and freedom of the press in the Cape.

Fairbairn later bought the paper from Greig, thus becoming owner and editor, and presiding over the paper's heyday. Then in July 1853, he oversaw a merger with The Cape Town Mail, and took its owner William Buchanan as partner in the new combined publication. In August 1860, they renamed the paper The Commercial Advertiser and Mail.

== Mergers and decline (1864-79) ==
Fairbairn died in 1864, and the paper passed into the hands of Mr John Noble, whose brother Professor Roderick Noble, served as editor. At the same time, Saul Solomon's rising newspaper, the Cape Argus, began to overtake the Commercial Advertiser and Mail as the predominant newspaper of the Cape Colony.

The Advertiser's decline continued as it passed into the hands of Van de Sandt, de Villiers & Co. with R.W. Murray ("Limner") as editor. In the hope of bolstering the declining paper, the new owners oversaw a further merger, in September 1869, with the Cape Standard, and the paper took on its final name of The Cape Standard and Mail. The paper finally shut down permanently in December 1879.
