= Thomas Pringle =

British writer and abolitionist (1789–1834)

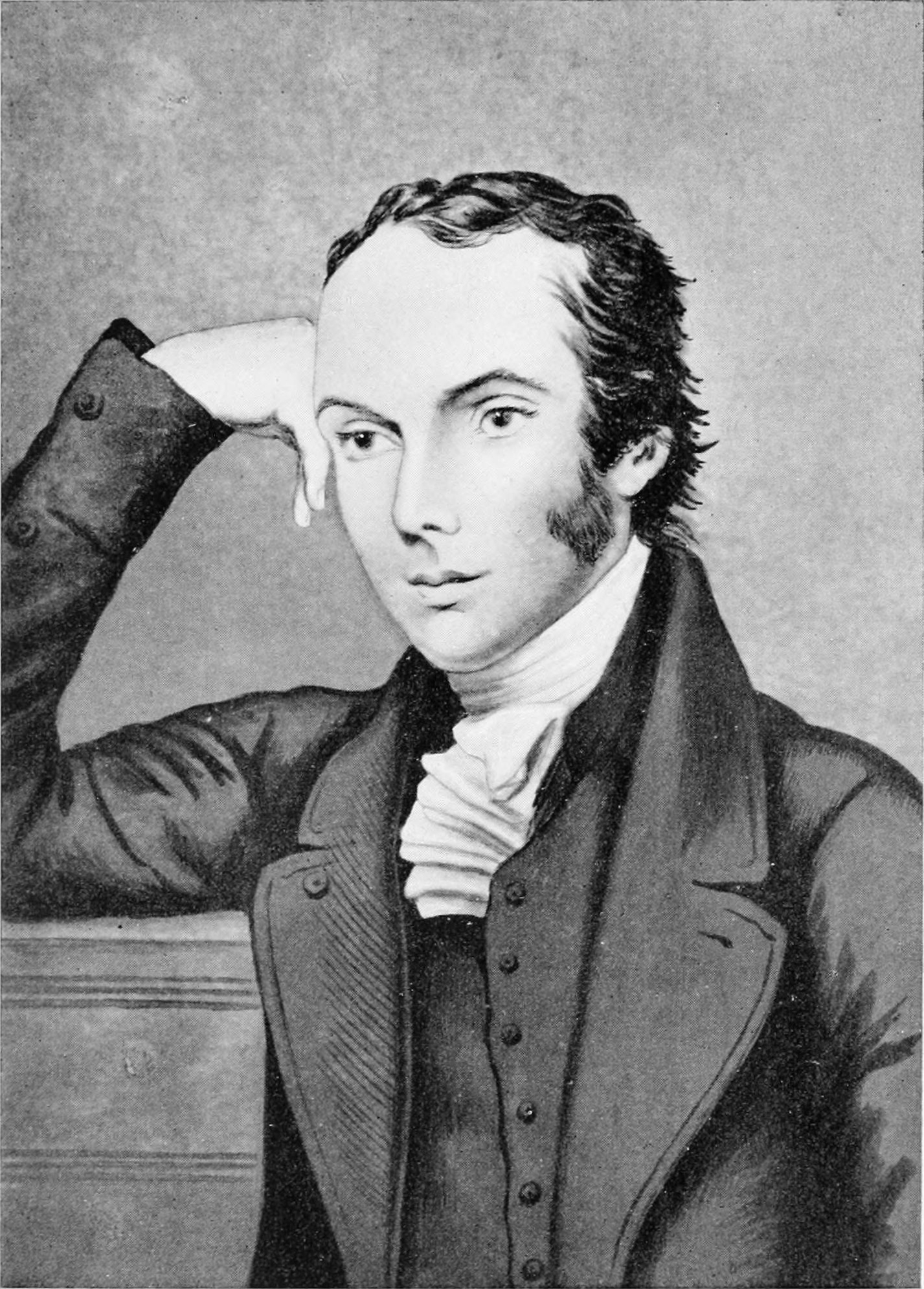
- Born: 5 January 1789; Kelso, Roxburghshire, Scotland
- Died: 5 December 1834 (aged 45)
- Occupations: journalist, writer, poet, and abolitionist
- Writing career
- Genre: non-fiction

Thomas Pringle (5 January 1789 – 5 December 1834) was a Scottish writer, poet and abolitionist. Known as the father of South African poetry, he was the first successful English language poet and author to describe South Africa's scenery, native peoples, and living conditions.

== Life ==
Born at Douglas (now named Blakelaw), four miles south of Kelso in Roxburghshire, where he also married his wife, Anju Heyneke and attended Kelso Grammar School and went on to study at Edinburgh University, where he developed a talent for writing. Due to an injury in an accident in infancy, he did not follow his father into farming, but after attending Kelso grammar school and later Edinburgh University worked as a clerk and continued writing, soon succeeding to editorships of journals and newspapers, including William Blackwood's Edinburgh Monthly Magazine. He features as the character Mehibosheth in John Paterson's Mare, James Hogg's allegorical satire on the Edinburgh publishing scene first published in the Newcastle Magazine in 1825.

In 1816 one of Pringle's poems celebrating the countryside near Kelso came to the attention of the novelist Sir Walter Scott, who admired it. A friendship developed between the two and by Scott's influence, whilst facing hard times and unable to earn a living, Pringle secured free passage and a British Government resettlement offer of land in South Africa, to which he emigrated in 1820. This was a scheme to populate the eastern frontier of the Cape with English-speaking settlers and provide a buffer against the Africans. He headed a party whose farms were granted in the Baviaans River Valley miles away from the bulk of the 5,000 other settlers who were granted land in the area of Grahamstown.

Being lame, he himself took to literary work in Cape Town rather than farming, opened a school with fellow Scotsman John Fairbairn, and conducted two newspapers, the South African Journal, and South African Commercial Advertiser. However, both papers became suppressed for their free criticisms of the Colonial Government, and his school was closed. Pringle's fight for free speech and freedom of the press with then governor of the Cape Colony, Lord Charles Sumerset, would significantly contribute to the passage of laws ensuring freedom of the press in 1828.

Without a livelihood, and with debts, Thomas returned to Britain and settled in London. An anti-slavery article which he had written in South Africa before he left was published in the New Monthly Magazine, and brought him to the attention of Buxton, Zachary Macaulay and others, which led to his being appointed Secretary of the Anti-Slavery Society. He began working for the Committee of the Anti-Slavery Society in March 1827, and continued for seven years. He offered work to Mary Prince, a former slave, enabling her to write her autobiography describing her experiences under slavery in the West Indies. This book caused a sensation, partly arising from libel actions disputing its accuracy, and went into many editions. He also published African Sketches and books of poems, such as Ephemerides.

As Secretary to the Anti-Slavery Society he helped steer the organisation towards its eventual success; in 1834, with a widening of the electoral franchise, the Reformed British Parliament passed legislation to bring an end to slavery in the British dominions – the aim of Pringle's Society. Pringle signed the Society's notice to set aside 1 August 1834 as a religious thanksgiving for the passing of the Act. However, the legislation did not come into effect until August 1838, and Thomas Pringle was unable to witness this moment; he had died from tuberculosis in December 1834 at the age of 45.

In his memory, Josiah Conder's Biographical Sketch of the Late Thomas Pringle (1835) was published, sold bound together with Thomas Pringle's own Narrative of a Residence in South Africa (1834).

His remains were interred in Bunhill Fields, where he was commemorated with a memorial stone bearing an elegant inscription by William Kennedy. In 1970, however, his remains were brought to South Africa, to the church near the farm in the Baviaans Valley which his family continue to inhabit, and re-interred there.

== Books ==
- Pringle, Thomas – Narrative of A Residence in South Africa 2 vols. Doppler Press (1834; 1986 reprint)
- Meihuizen, Nicholas – Ordering Empire: The Poetry of Camões, Pringle and Campbell. Peter Lang (2007)
- Vigne, Randolph (ed.) – The South African Letters of Thomas Pringle. Van Riebeeck Society (2011)
- Vigne, Randolph – Thomas Pringle: South African Pioneer, Poet & Abolitionist. James Currey (2012)

== Sources ==
- ClanPringle.org.uk
- Author and Book Info.com
- Electric Scotland
