= Goodwood, Western Cape =

Goodwood
- Location within Western Cape Location within South Africa Location within Africa
- Coordinates: 33°54′24″S 18°32′57″E
- Country: South Africa
- Province: Western Cape
- Municipality: City of Cape Town

Area
  - Total: 17.94 km^{2} (6.93 sq mi)

Population (2011)
  - Total: 50,285
  - Density: 2,803/km^{2} (7,260/sq mi)

Racial makeup (2011)
  - Black African: 17.9%
  - Coloured: 37.9%
  - Indian/Asian: 3.4%
  - White: 37.9%
  - Other: 2.9%

First languages (2011)
  - English: 50.9%
  - Afrikaans: 35.0%
  - Xhosa: 4.9%
  - Other: 9.2%
- Time zone: UTC+2 (SAST)
- Postal code (street): 7460
- PO box: 7459
- Area code: 021

Goodwood is a suburb of Cape Town in the Western Cape, South Africa and is situated in the Tygerberg region of the City of Cape Town. It is 10 kilometres from Cape Town and accessible from the N1, N7 and N2 highways.

The town was established in 1905 and named after Goodwood Racecourse in England as the founders intended to make it a racing centre. A course was actually constructed, but after only one meeting it was abandoned.

The first railway station was built in 1905, and today there are five within the municipal area. Three of them lie on the Cape Town-Johannesburg main line: Goodwood, Vasco and Elsies River. It also has Monte Vista and Acacia Park stations which are on the secondary line between Cape Town and Bellville.

Following the outbreak of World War II and South Africa's entry into the war in 1939, the Wingfield Aerodrome was established in the suburb. It was Cape Town's primary airport until 1953. The suburb also hosts the largest of South Africa's parliamentary villages for non-local politicians, Acacia Park.

== Schools ==
- Koos Sadie Primary School, a dual medium coeducational primary school.
- Goodwood Park, a dual-medium coeducational primary school
- De Vrijzee Primary School, a dual medium coeducational primary school.
- JG Meiring High School, an English-medium coeducational high school, this school is now built on the spot where the racecourse was built
- Fairbairn College, an English-medium coeducational high school
- Hoërskool President, a dual-medium coeducational high school

== Coat of arms ==
Goodwood was a municipality in its own right from 1938 to 1996. In 1939, the council adopted a pseudo-heraldic "coat of arms" depicting an aeroplane, an ox-wagon, and a horse jumping over a fence. It replaced this device with a proper coat of arms, designed by Ivan Mitford-Barberton, in 1958. The council registered the arms with the Cape Provincial Administration in May 1959 and at the Bureau of Heraldry in August 1993.

The arms were : Argent, on a fess Gules, between in chief four trees with six leaves each and in base three pallets, Sable, the central pallet surmounted by a cogwheel counterchanged, a leopard passant, Argent and Sable. In layman's terms : a silver shield displaying, from top to bottom, a row of four black trees with six leaves each, a red horizontal stripe displaying a leopard, and three black vertical stripes with a cogwheel on the centre stripe.

The crest was a palamino unicorn issuing from a golden mural crown and holding a red disc between its forelegs, and the motto was Procedo.

== Other links ==
- Goodwood (in the Afrikaans language Wikipedia)
- Goodwood Directory
