= Stanford, South Africa =

Stanford
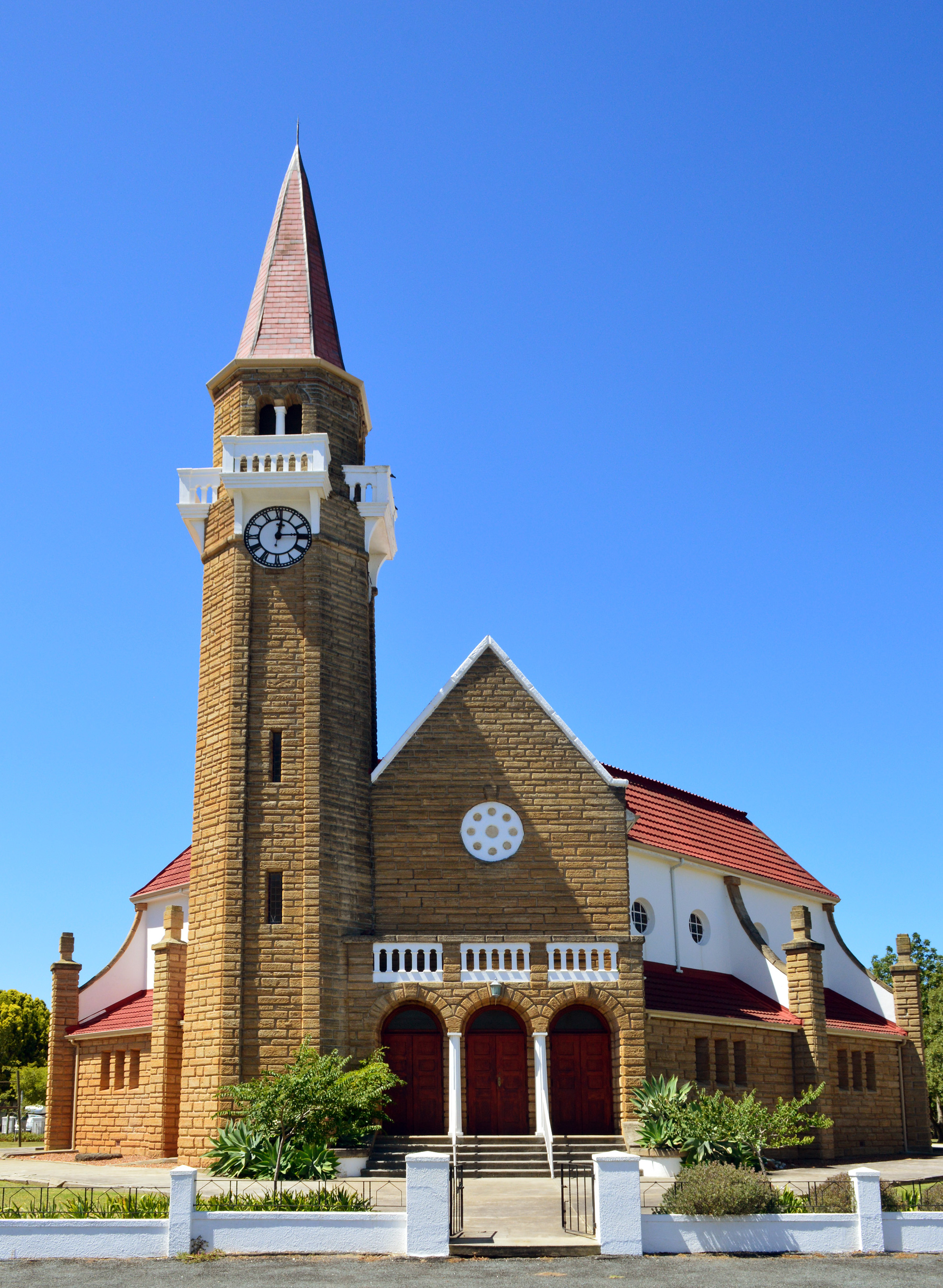
- Dutch Reformed Church

- Location within Western Cape Location within South Africa
- Coordinates: 34°26′30″S 19°27′20″E
- Country: South Africa
- Province: Western Cape
- District: Overberg
- Municipality: Overstrand
- Established: 1856

Government
  - Councillor: Dudley Coetzee (DA)

Area
  - Total: 3.92 km^{2} (1.51 sq mi)
- Elevation: 10 m (33 ft)

Population (2011)
  - Total: 4,797
  - Density: 1,220/km^{2} (3,170/sq mi)

Racial makeup (2011)
  - Black African: 29.1%
  - Coloured: 60.3%
  - Indian/Asian: 0.2%
  - White: 9.7%
  - Other: 0.7%

First languages (2011)
  - Afrikaans: 65.8%
  - Xhosa: 25.3%
  - English: 6.7%
  - Other: 2.2%
- Time zone: UTC+2 (SAST)
- Postal code (street): 7210
- PO box: 7210
- Area code: 028

Stanford is a small riverside village in Overberg District Municipality in the Western Cape province of South Africa. Located 16 km east of Hermanus and 22 km north-east of Gansbaai.

== History ==
The village of Stanford was founded in 1857 and named after its founder, Sir Robert Stanford, who owned the original farm and had a number of business interests in the area. Stanford, also a captain in the British army, was effectively exiled from the Cape after being ordered to supply the convict carrying ship, The Neptune, with provisions during the Convict crisis of 1849.

Situated in the heart of the Overberg, Stanford is known for its beautifully preserved and renovated Cape Victorian and Edwardian styled houses and buildings. The village as a whole was declared a Heritage Site and in 1992 the Stanford Conservation Trust was formed to ensure the protection and conservation of the environment and heritage resources in and around Stanford. The work of the Trust ensured that Stanford remains the 3rd most preserved village in the Western Cape.

Located on the banks of the Klein River, Stanford is known to host over 200 different bird species of which 30 are endemic to South Africa. Some of the attractions of Stanford including the over 100-years-old Stanford Hotel, river cruises on the Klein River, bird watching, kayaking and beer- and wine tasting at the local wine estates.

== Stanford Food Heroes ==
The village is also renowned for its Stanford Food Heroes, a small group of culinary artisans that aims to increase community access to fresh, organic and sustainably grown produce. Their array of locally produced and sourced products can be purchased at the local morning markets that line the Stanford Events calendar.
