= Gonaqua =

Khoikhoi ethnic group

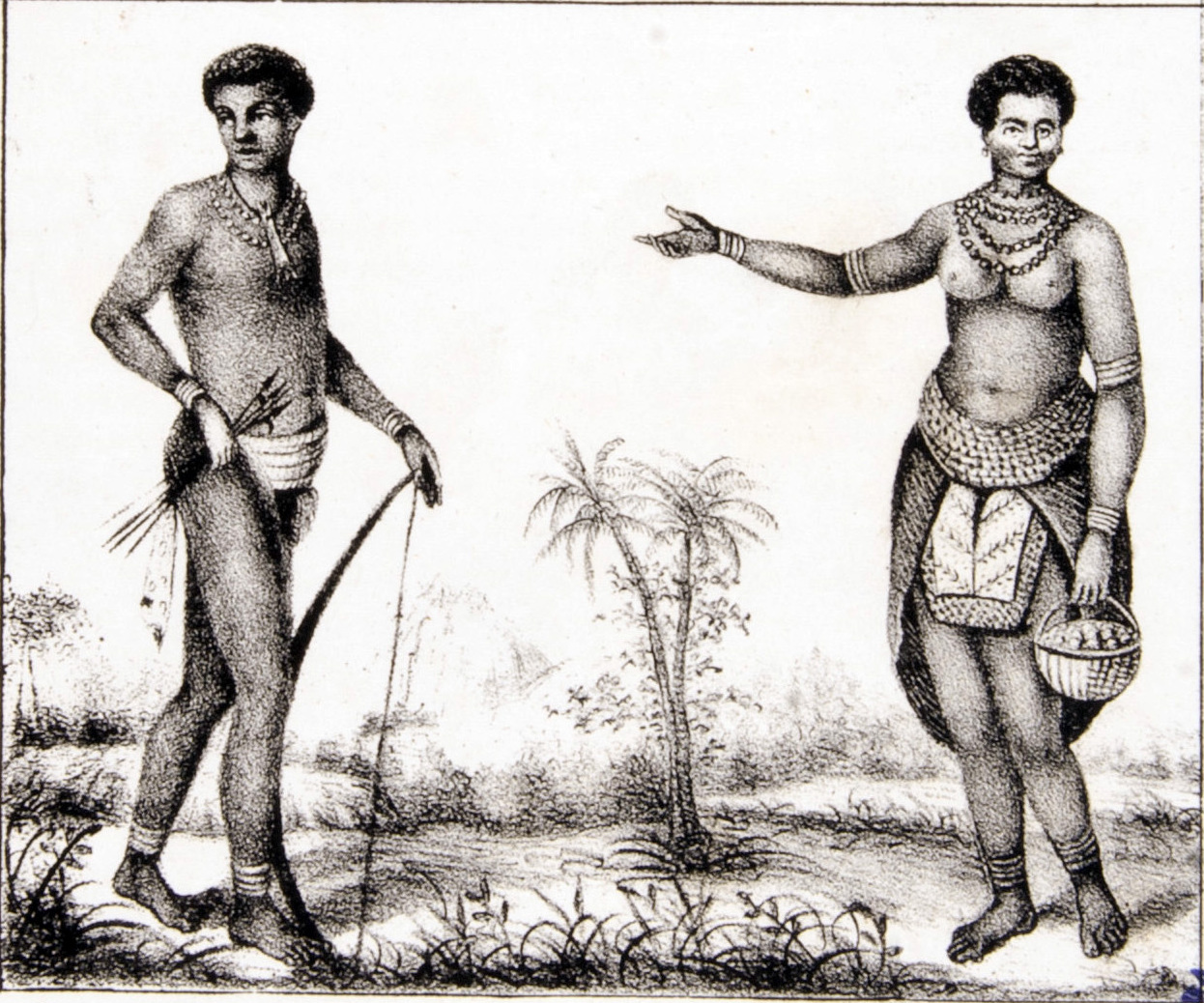
A Gonaqua man and woman (1839)

The Gonaqua (or Ghonaqua or Gonaguas, meaning "borderers") were an Khoikhoi ethnic group, descendants of a very old union between the Khoikhoi and the Xhosa. This union predates the arrival of Europeans in South Africa. The Gonaqua have been regarded as outcasts by the Bantus. They were targets during the Second Frontier War, but received protection from the British.
