= Newlands (House of Assembly of South Africa constituency) =

- Nuweland
- Former constituency for the South African House of Assembly
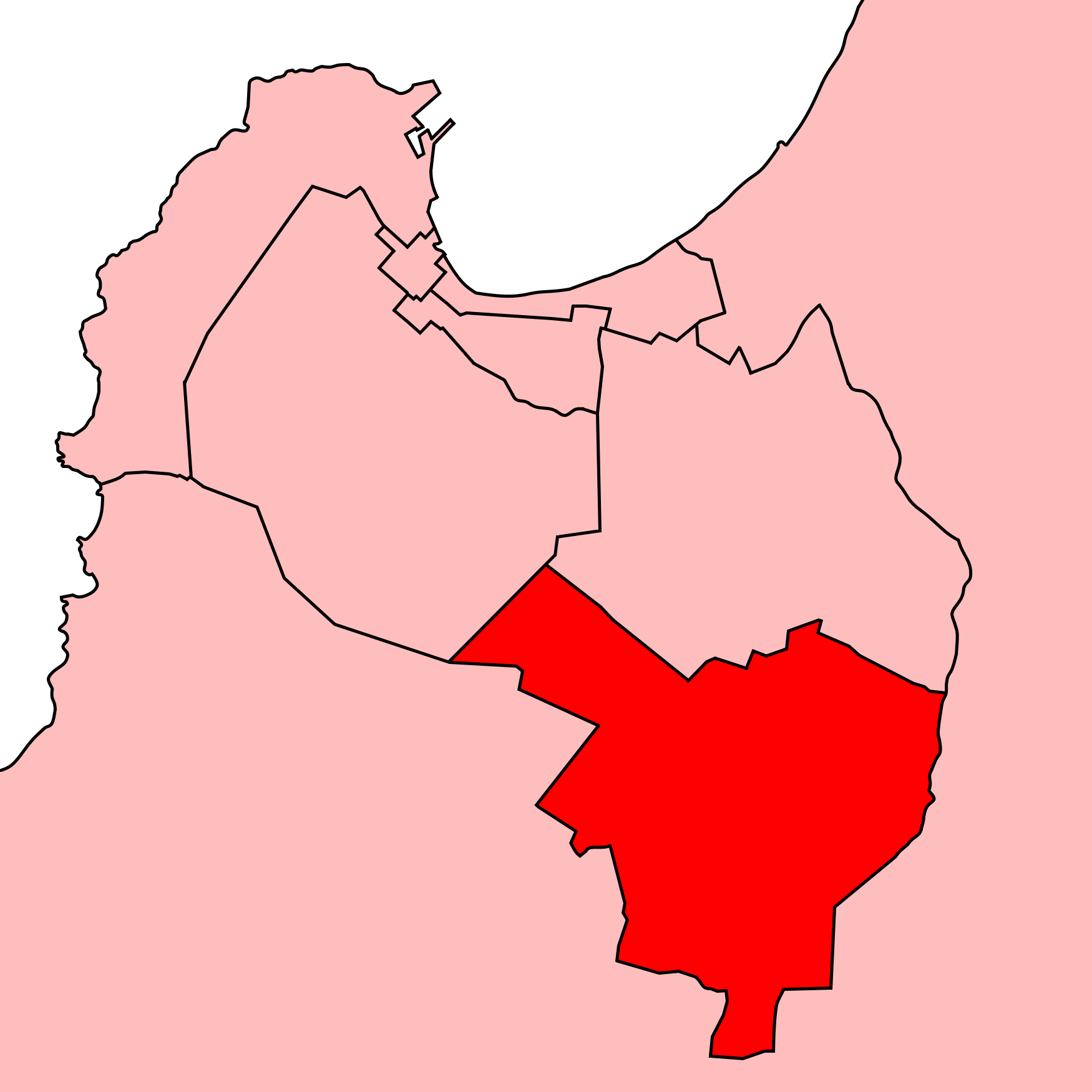
- Location of Newlands within Cape Town (1924)
- Province: Cape of Good Hope
- Electorate: 3,785 (1924)

Former constituency
- Created: 1910
- Abolished: 1933
- Number of members: 1
- Last MHA: Richard Stuttaford (SAP)
- Replaced by: Claremont

Newlands (Afrikaans: Nuweland) was a constituency in the Cape Province of South Africa, which existed from 1910 to 1933. It covered parts of Cape Town’s southern suburbs, centred on its namesake suburb of Newlands. Throughout its existence it elected one member to the House of Assembly and one to the Cape Provincial Council.

== Franchise notes ==
When the Union of South Africa was formed in 1910, the electoral qualifications in use in each pre-existing colony were kept in place. The Cape Colony had implemented a “colour-blind” franchise known as the Cape Qualified Franchise, which included all adult literate men owning more than £75 worth of property (controversially raised from £25 in 1892), and this initially remained in effect after the colony became the Cape Province. As of 1908, 22,784 out of 152,221 electors in the Cape Colony were “Native or Coloured”. Eligibility to serve in Parliament and the Provincial Council, however, was restricted to whites from 1910 onward.

The first challenge to the Cape Qualified Franchise came with the Women's Enfranchisement Act, 1930 and the Franchise Laws Amendment Act, 1931, which extended the vote to women and removed property qualifications for the white population only – non-white voters remained subject to the earlier restrictions. In 1936, the Representation of Natives Act removed all black voters from the common electoral roll and introduced three “Native Representative Members”, white MPs elected by the black voters of the province and meant to represent their interests in particular. A similar provision was made for Coloured voters with the Separate Representation of Voters Act, 1951, and although this law was challenged by the courts, it went into effect in time for the 1958 general election, which was thus held with all-white voter rolls for the first time in South African history. The all-white franchise would continue until the end of apartheid and the introduction of universal suffrage in 1994.

== History ==
Like most of Cape Town’s southern suburbs, Newlands was largely English-speaking and liberal. It was represented by a succession of Unionist MPs through the 1910s, and after the Unionist Party’s merger into the South African Party (SAP) in 1921, remained loyal to that party. Its last MP was Richard Stuttaford, first elected in 1924, whose father had founded the Stuttafords department store chain. When Newlands was abolished in 1933, Stuttaford stood for and won the new seat of Claremont, which he would represent until 1943.

== Members ==
Election	Member	Party
1910	Charles Struben	Unionist
1915	G. S. Withinshaw	Unionist
1918 by	W. P. Buchanan	Unionist
1920	W. P. Buchanan	Unionist
1921	W. P. Buchanan	South African
1924	Richard Stuttaford	South African
1929	Richard Stuttaford	South African
1933	constituency abolished	

== Detailed results ==
=== Elections in the 1910s ===
General election 1910: Newlands
Party	Candidate	Votes	%	±%
Unionist	Charles Struben	1,083	62.7	New
Independent	L. A. W. Beck	643	37.3	New
Majority		440	25.4	N/A
Unionist win (new seat)				

General election 1915: Newlands
Party	Candidate	Votes	%	±%
Unionist	G. S. Withinshaw	1,672	79.7	+17.0
Labour	C. H. Hagger	425	20.3	New
Majority		1,247	59.4	N/A
Turnout		2,097	55.4	N/A
Unionist hold		Swing	N/A	

Newlands by-election, 19 February 1919
Party	Candidate	Votes	%	±%
Unionist	W. P. Buchanan	1,072	60.1	−19.6
Labour	J. Lomax	712	39.9	+19.6
Majority		360	20.2	−39.2
Turnout		1,784	41.3	−14.1
Unionist hold		Swing	-19.6	

=== Elections in the 1920s ===
General election 1920: Newlands
Party	Candidate	Votes	%	±%
Unionist	W. P. Buchanan	1,514	64.8	−14.9
Labour	J. Lomax	823	35.2	+14.9
Majority		691	29.6	−29.8
Turnout		2,337	55.5	+0.1
Unionist hold		Swing	-14.9	

General election 1921: Newlands
Party	Candidate	Votes	%	±%
South African	W. P. Buchanan	1,844	77.7	+12.9
Labour	J. Lomax	528	22.3	−12.9
Majority		1,316	55.4	+25.8
Turnout		2,372	55.5	+−0
South African hold		Swing	+12.9	

General election 1924: Newlands
Party	Candidate	Votes	%	±%
South African	Richard Stuttaford	1,717	61.7	−14.0
Constitutional Democrat	C. A. Lagesen	1,015	36.5	New
Rejected ballots		51	1.8	N/A
Majority		702	25.2	N/A
Turnout		2,783	73.5	+18.0
South African hold		Swing	N/A	

General election 1929: Newlands
Party	Candidate	Votes	%	±%
South African	Richard Stuttaford	Unopposed		
South African hold				
