= Max Sonnenberg =

German-born South African businessman (1879–1955)

Max Sonnenberg (Kaiserslautern, Rhineland-Palatinate, 3 May 1879 – Muizenberg, Cape Province, 28 October 1955) was a businessman, politician, and Jewish community leader.

== Background and life in Vryburg ==
Sonnenberg was the only son of Louis Sonnenberg and his wife, Mathilde Strauss. Two of his uncles, Charles and Isaac (Ikey) emigrated to Griqualand West to join the early diamond mining industry there, and Max's father, a teacher, and his family persuaded him to follow their example in 1891. Charles was elected to the Parliament of the Cape of Good Hope in 1896. Louis's family first lived in the village of Madibogo, where he managed a two-room hotel in partnership with S. Solomon & Co. They later moved to Vryburg, where Louis owned a store. After a time working as a traveling salesman along the railways being built through Bechuanaland and Rhodesia, Sonnenberg opened a grocery in Bulawayo in 1898.

After the Second Boer War, he returned to Vryburg, where he farmed and continued to grow his mercantile career; he served as mayor of the town (1919–20) after being elected to the city council in 1912. He was a founder of Bechuanaland Dairies, which was later acquired by Royal Dairy Ltd. He persuaded the city to spend £40,000 to build a reservoir to mitigate chronic water shortages. During the 1918 Spanish flu pandemic, he contributed money to the Vryburg Hospital to buy equipment, for which he was later compensated unexpectedly, and built a soup kitchen in which he and his wife both worked.

== In Cape Town ==
In 1920, Sonnenberg moved to Cape Town, where he became chairman of the Cape Chamber of Commerce & Industry and founded a number of important companies. In 1931, he founded Woolworths (Edms.) Beperk, one of South Africa's first and most successful store chains, and remained its chairman and manager until his death. His friend Eli Susman helped manage the stores in Transvaal. Max's son, Richard, who was later named governor of the University of Tel Aviv, succeeded his father as chairman of Woolworths and forged an agreement with British store chain Marks & Spencer to sell Woolworths' merchandise on an expanded basis. (According to another source, it was Max himself who signed a different agreement in 1947).

== Public service ==
Sonnenberg had a long and remarkable career in public life: From 1919 to 1921, he represented Bechuanaland in the Parliament of South Africa as a member of the South African Party; afterwards (1925–1938), he was a member of the Cape Provincial Council. In 1938, he returned to Parliament as a United Party representative for the constituency of South Peninsula, in which capacity he served until 1949, when he retired from politics. During his second tenure in Parliament, Sonnenberg mainly focused on commercial and industrial issues. He chaired a select committee whose proposal for a federal takeover of provincial fisheries was adopted.

After he settled in Muizenberg and began representing a constituency on the coast, he became greatly interested in marine issues and offered his help to the fishers of False Bay. He served on a parliamentary commission that considered the founding of a maritime college and contributed a significant sum of money toward setting up such a school. However, nothing came of the project.

== Contributions to Jewish life ==
Concerned about the takeover of the Nazi Party in Germany and its persecution of his co-religionists in Central Europe, Sonnenberg campaigned heavily to resettle several thousand German Jews in South Africa in the 1930s. He also unsuccessfully negotiated with the French premier, Leon Blum, on the Madagascar Plan to evacuate Jews there. A staunch Zionist, Sonnenberg actively raised money to support those living in Mandatory Palestine and later Israel, and he founded the club and community center Rosecourt for Jewish youth in the suburb of Gardens, Cape Town.

His autobiography, The Way I Saw It, was published posthumously in Cape Town in 1957, and contains lively passages on Sonnenberg's early career in Rhodesia and Bechuanaland (now Botswana), and includes information about his relationship with political leaders such as J. B. M. Hertzog, Jan Smuts, and D.F. Malan, as well as his tireless attempts to fight Nazi influence in South Africa. Sonnenberg's great admiration of Smuts reached its apex in the Max Sonnenberg University Trust, through which South African students of all races earned Field Marshal Smuts Scholarships. The Trust has since established the Max Sonnenberg Chair of Marine Geoscience at the University of Cape Town.

== Family life ==
Sonnenberg's marriage in 1906 to Lillie Isaacs (1887–1963), daughter of Samuel Isaacs of the Johannesburg Stock Exchange, produced five children, a son named Richard (born in 1907) and four daughters. His son succeeded him as chairman of Woolworths and continued to hold that job for many years.

== Sources ==
- (en) Schamberger, Paul (ed.). 2004. Jewish Life in the South African Country Communities, vol. II. Johannesburg: South African Friends of Beth Hatefutsoth.
- (af) Beyers, C.J. (chief ed.). 1981. Suid-Afrikaanse Biografiese Woordeboek, vol. IV. Durban: Butterworth & Kie (Edms) Bpk.
