= Jannie Momberg =

South African politician and businessman (1938–2011)

Member of the National Assembly
- In office 9 May 1994 – 26 June 2001

Member of the House of Assembly for Simonstown
- In office 6 September 1989 – 9 May 1994

Personal details
- Born: 27 July 1938 Stellenbosch, Cape Province; Union of South Africa
- Died: 7 January 2011 (aged 72) Noordhoek, Cape Town; Western Cape, South Africa
- Party: African National Congress (from 1992); Democratic Party (1989–1992); National Party (1957–1987)
- Spouse: Trienie Steyn (m. 1964)
- Education: Paul Roos Gymnasium
- Alma mater: Stellenbosch University
- Nickname: Jan Bek

Jan Hendrik "Jannie" Momberg (27 July 1938 – 7 January 2011) was a South African politician, businessman, and sports administrator who served in the South African Parliament from 1989 to 2001. A former member of the National Party (NP), Momberg's opposition to apartheid led him to become a founding member of the Democratic Party in 1989, and he joined the African National Congress (ANC) in 1992.

Born in Stellenbosch to a conservative Afrikaans family, Momberg inherited half of Middelvlei wine estate and subsequently purchased Neethlingshof Estate. Alongside his business career, he was a sports administrator in the Cape Province and later nationally as a member of the board of the South African Athletics Association. He joined the National Party in 1957 and remained a member until 1987, though by the mid-1960s he was openly critical of aspects of the party's policy of apartheid. By the mid-1980s, Momberg had publicly called for the abolition of apartheid.

In the 1989 general election, he was elected to the House of Assembly, representing the Democratic Party in Simonstown. From 1992, he sat as an independent after defecting to join the recently unbanned ANC. The next general election in 1994 was held under universal suffrage with the ANC's participation and Momberg was elected to an ANC seat in the post-apartheid National Assembly. He served as the party's programming whip until June 2001, when President Thabo Mbeki appointed him to a diplomatic posting. He served as South African Ambassador to Greece from 2001 to 2006.

== Early life and career ==
Momberg was born on 27 July 1938 in Stellenbosch in the former Cape Province. He was a member of a prominent Afrikaans family: his father and uncle owned Middelvlei, a successful wine estate in Stellenbosch, and were connected to politicians of the National Party (NP), which came to power in 1948. He was raised alongside his cousin, also named Jan; his cousin was known as Stil Jan (Afrikaans for "quiet Jan") and he, for his volubility, as Jan Bek ("loudmouth Jan"). According to News24, rugby player Jannie Engelbrecht devised the nicknames.

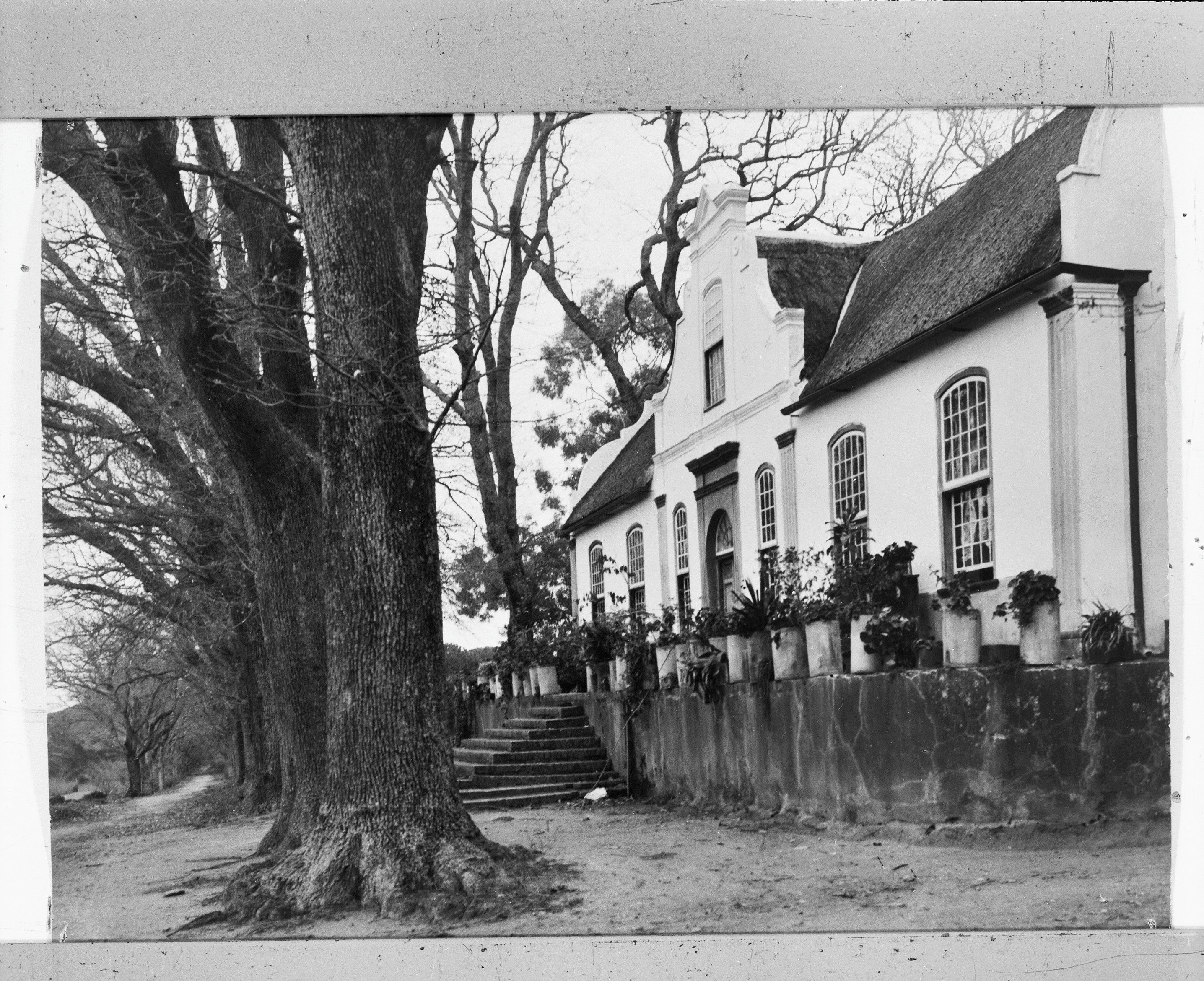
The manor house at Neethlingshof Estate, which Momberg owned

After matriculating at Paul Roos Gymnasium, Momberg joined the NP in 1957 through its youth wing at Stellenbosch University. Two years later, after his father died, he suspended his studies to help run Middelvlei, of which he inherited half. He sold his share of Middelvlei to his cousin in 1963 and bought the nearby Neethlingshof Estate, another successful vineyard; he also ultimately completed his bachelor's degree in history and economics. Alongside his business career, Momberg, though not himself an athlete, became involved in sports administration from 1969; he served in leadership positions in the South African Athletics Association and became the manager and mentor of runner Zola Budd in the 1980s.

== National Party member: 1957–1987 ==
At the same time, Momberg remained a member of the NP and was secretary of his local party branch by 1963, although he increasingly questioned the party's policy of apartheid. In 1963, after Coloureds were barred from attending a symphony at Cape Town City Hall, he wrote to Die Burger, the NP's mouthpiece, to say that "he had never heard of 'skollies' [Coloured criminals] in dress suits attending symphonic performances", concluding with a condemnation of the Group Areas Act as "immoral".

Momberg wrote in his memoirs that, from then onwards, he was "continuously engaged in fights with the NP over certain policies with which I could not associate myself". By 1982, he was publicly labelling apartheid as "ugly" and unsustainable. In 1985, still a full-time businessman, he called for its abolition, arguing that it had led the international community to view Afrikaners as racist and South African society as nearing extinction. Earlier that year he had told Time magazine that he thought the NP should "scrap the bloody three-Way Parliament", saying:

It may sound crazy, but what we need for the next ten years is enlightened dictatorship. Not for the black population, but for the whites. I think we're going to have to force through certain things against the whites for the sake of the country.

== Political career: 1989–2001 ==
=== Democratic Party: 1989–1992 ===
Increasingly concerned about the South African political situation – partly as a result of trips to the United Kingdom, where he could read uncensored media reports – Momberg resigned from the NP in 1987 and became a founding member of the liberal Democratic Party (DP) the following year. In the 1989 general election, he was elected to the House of Assembly, representing the DP in the constituency of Simonstown in Cape Town.

He set an example for young and not-so-young Afrikaners, and a myriad of others: they, too, have a place in the ANC, and even more so in the democratic South Africa... Such was Oom Jannie's visionary leadership that, before the dawn of democracy, he had already recognised that the only path to nation-building was not to further marginalise the marginalised; and that the interests of white Afrikanerdom were best served in the mainstream of South African political life.

— Marius Fransman

Momberg was a member of a wing of the DP which advocated for closer ties to the anti-apartheid African National Congress (ANC), a majority-black movement then banned inside South Africa. In 1990, around the time that the ANC was unbanned, he was part of a DP delegation to the movement's headquarters in exile in Lusaka, Zambia; in his memoirs, he recounted the significance of meeting personally the ANC leaders whom he had been led to believe were terrorists.

=== Independent: 1992–1994 ===
In April 1992, Momberg and four other parliamentarians – David Dalling, Pierre Cronjé, Jan van Eck, and Robert Haswell – were suspended from the DP after the party's leadership learned that they had recently held a private meeting with ANC President Nelson Mandela. The following week, the group announced that they were defecting from the DP to join the ANC. In a joint statement, the group said that they were responding to a call made by Mandela shortly after his release from prison in 1990, for "all our white compatriots to join us in the shaping of a new South Africa". Momberg said that they had concluded that "working toward a democratic transition cannot be done from the comfortable sidelines of minority politics". They said that they regarded their constituencies as consisting of all the residents of their areas, not only the enfranchised white citizens.

Momberg and the others remained in Parliament as independents for the rest of the legislative term. At the same time, later in 1992, Momberg was elected to the executive committee of the ANC's new Western Cape branch. Explaining his defection to the ANC, Momberg's colleague in the DP, Dene Smuts, later said:

He had traversed the entire political terrain from the old establishment to the incoming new and he did so from the personal conviction that it was, for him, the right thing to do. It is not that he didn't work through the ideological considerations that normally drive defection... He did take the ANC's nonracist, nonsexist ethos under review. He said he understood the nonracism, but he could not understand what you had against sex. [Laughter.] However, the reason that it was for him the right thing to do to join the ANC was that he felt that he had a historic debt.

According to his wife:

He just felt that it was the only way to atone for the fact that he had supported the National Party in the past. Although he had to endure abuse [from white conservatives], he did not for one moment, till the day he died, doubt that he had done the right thing and he received huge support from the real majority of the people of South Africa.

=== African National Congress: 1994–2001 ===
In the 1994 general election, South Africa's first under universal suffrage, Momberg was elected to represent the ANC in the new National Assembly. He served in his seat until 2001, gaining re-election in the 1999 general election, and he served as the ANC's programming whip, initially under Chief Whip Arnold Stofile. After his death, his colleagues recollected the lengths to which he had gone to facilitate meetings among influential people of different political and socioeconomic backgrounds, with ANC representative Mosiuoa Lekota saying, "if there is a little equanimity in this House, it has quite a bit to do with the work that he did". He resigned from his seat with effect from 26 June 2001 and his seat was filled by Joyce Moloi.

== Diplomatic career and retirement ==
Upon his departure from Parliament, Momberg was appointed by President Thabo Mbeki as South African Ambassador to Greece, with non-resident accreditation to Serbia-Montenegro, Bosnia-Herzegovina and Cyprus. The Mayor of Athens awarded him the Medal of the City of Athens for his role in promoting good diplomatic relations between South Africa and Greece. In 2006, he retired to Muizenberg in Cape Town, where he remained involved in philanthropy and business.

== Personal life and death ==
Momberg married Trienie Steyn in 1964; they had four sons and several grandchildren. Politician Marius Swart was the father-in-law of one of his sons.

He died on 7 January 2011 of heart failure, having collapsed at Longbeach Mall in Noordhoek after spending the day at a cricket test match at Newlands Stadium. At Momberg's request, his funeral service, held in Stellenbosch, was conducted in English by Reverend Braam Hanekom. His memoirs were published posthumously.
