= South Peninsula (House of Assembly of South Africa constituency) =

Constituency in South Africa

- Suid-Skiereiland
- Former constituency for the South African House of Assembly
- Province: Cape of Good Hope
- Electorate: 3,928 (1929)

Former constituency
- Created: 1910
- Abolished: 1958
- Number of members: 1
- Last MHA: L. C. Gay (UP)
- Replaced by: Simonstown

South Peninsula (Afrikaans: Suid-Skiereiland) was a constituency in the Cape Province of South Africa, which existed from 1910 to 1958. As the name implies, it covered roughly the southern half of the Cape Peninsula, and initially also much of the Cape Flats. Throughout its existence it elected one member to the House of Assembly and one to the Cape Provincial Council.

== Franchise notes ==
When the Union of South Africa was formed in 1910, the electoral qualifications in use in each pre-existing colony were kept in place. The Cape Colony had implemented a “colour-blind” franchise known as the Cape Qualified Franchise, which included all adult literate men owning more than £75 worth of property (controversially raised from £25 in 1892), and this initially remained in effect after the colony became the Cape Province. As of 1908, 22,784 out of 152,221 electors in the Cape Colony were “Native or Coloured”. Eligibility to serve in Parliament and the Provincial Council, however, was restricted to whites from 1910 onward.

The first challenge to the Cape Qualified Franchise came with the Women's Enfranchisement Act, 1930 and the Franchise Laws Amendment Act, 1931, which extended the vote to women and removed property qualifications for the white population only – non-white voters remained subject to the earlier restrictions. In 1936, the Representation of Natives Act removed all black voters from the common electoral roll and introduced three “Native Representative Members”, white MPs elected by the black voters of the province and meant to represent their interests in particular. A similar provision was made for Coloured voters with the Separate Representation of Voters Act, 1951, and although this law was challenged by the courts, it went into effect in time for the 1958 general election, which was thus held with all-white voter rolls for the first time in South African history. The all-white franchise would continue until the end of apartheid and the introduction of universal suffrage in 1994.

== History ==
When South Peninsula was first created, it almost completely surrounded Cape Town, stretching from Camps Bay in the west to Athlone in the north and the Eerste River in the east. Suburban growth gradually cut the seat down in size, however, and after the creation of Cape Flats in 1929, it was more or less contained to the South Peninsula itself. Hout Bay was moved out of the seat in 1953, and in the following election, it was renamed Simonstown to reflect its more compact geography.

Like the rest of the Cape Town area, South Peninsula was a stronghold for the liberal, pro-British side of South African politics. Nevertheless, its politics were initially highly pluralistic – in 1915, it was the only constituency in South Africa with candidates from all four major political parties of the time (the Unionists, the SAP, the Nationals and Labour). The Unionist candidate, Murray Bisset, won by a wide margin, and would continue to represent the seat until 1924. In 1929, future cabinet minister Sidney Frank Waterson won his first election to the House of Assembly from the seat, and represented it until he moved to Claremont in 1943. By this point, South Peninsula was a safe seat for the United Party, whose candidates would win it in every election until its disappearance in 1958. Its last MP, Lewis Charles Gay, stood for and was elected unopposed in the new seat of Simonstown.

== Members ==
Election	Member	Party
1910	William Runciman	Unionist
1915	Murray Bisset	Unionist
1920	Murray Bisset	Unionist
1921	Murray Bisset	South African
1924	Drummond Chaplin	South African
1929	Sidney Frank Waterson	South African
1933	Sidney Frank Waterson	South African
1934	Sidney Frank Waterson	United
1938	Sidney Frank Waterson	United
1938 by	Max Sonnenberg	United
1943	Max Sonnenberg	United
1948	Max Sonnenberg	United
1949 by	L. C. Gay	United
1953	L. C. Gay	United
1958	Constituency abolished	

== Detailed results ==
=== Elections in the 1910s ===
General election 1910: South Peninsula
Party	Candidate	Votes	%	±%
Unionist	William Runciman	1,153	58.4	New
Independent	H. Cloete	754	38.2	New
South African	C. W. B. Molteno	68	3.4	New
Majority		399	20.2	N/A
Unionist win (new seat)				

General election 1915: South Peninsula
Party	Candidate	Votes	%	±%
Unionist	Murray Bisset	1,440	55.4	−3.0
South African	A. J. Chiappini	734	28.3	+23.9
National	R. Cloete	280	10.8	New
Labour	C. Hughes	144	5.5	New
Majority		706	27.1	N/A
Turnout		2,598	70.4	N/A
Unionist hold		Swing	N/A	

=== Elections in the 1920s ===
General election 1920: South Peninsula
Party	Candidate	Votes	%	±%
Unionist	Murray Bisset	1,203	65.2	+9.8
Labour	C. H. Haggar	385	20.9	+15.4
Independent	W. H. Lategan	257	13.9	New
Majority		818	44.3	N/A
Turnout		1,845	45.9	−24.5
Unionist hold		Swing	N/A	

General election 1921: South Peninsula
Party	Candidate	Votes	%	±%
South African	Murray Bisset	1,469	77.8	+9.8
Independent	W. H. Lategan	419	22.2	+8.3
Majority		1,050	55.6	N/A
Turnout		1,888	46.7	+0.8
South African hold		Swing	N/A	

General election 1924: South Peninsula
Party	Candidate	Votes	%	±%
South African	Drummond Chaplin	1,690	60.6	−17.2
National	W. H. Lategan	1,053	37.8	+16.2
Rejected ballots		46	1.7	N/A
Majority		637	22.8	−32.6
Turnout		2,789	64.9	+16.2
South African hold		Swing	-16.7	

General election 1929: South Peninsula
Party	Candidate	Votes	%	±%
South African	Sidney Frank Waterson	2,073	70.6	+10.0
National	W. H. Lategan	820	27.9	−9.9
Rejected ballots		44	1.6	-0.1
Majority		1,253	42.7	+19.9
Turnout		2,937	74.8	+9.9
South African hold		Swing	+10.0	

=== Elections in the 1930s ===
General election 1933: South Peninsula
Party	Candidate	Votes	%	±%
South African	Sidney Frank Waterson	Unopposed		
South African hold				

General election 1938: South Peninsula
Party	Candidate	Votes	%	±%
United	Sidney Frank Waterson	Unopposed		
United hold				

South Peninsula by-election, 15 November 1938
Party	Candidate	Votes	%	±%
United	Max Sonnenberg	Unopposed		
United hold				

=== Elections in the 1940s ===
General election 1943: South Peninsula
Party	Candidate	Votes	%	±%
United	Max Sonnenberg	Unopposed		
United hold				
