= Sidney Frank Waterson =

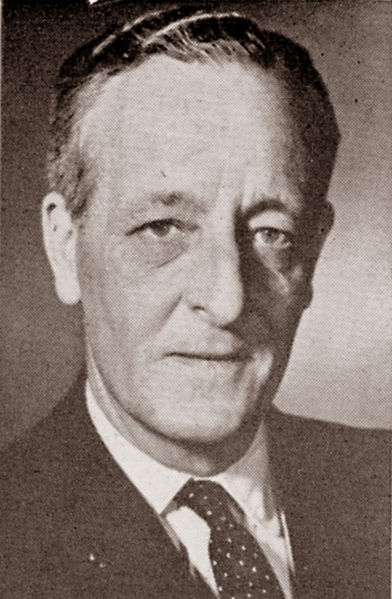

High Commissioner to the United Kingdom
- In office September 1939 – 1942
- Prime Minister: Jan Christian Smuts
- Preceded by: Charles Theodore Te Water
- Succeeded by: Deneys Reitz

Minister of Economic Development
- In office 11 January 1943 – 16 January 1948
- Prime Minister: Jan Christian Smuts
- Preceded by: Richard Stuttaford
- Succeeded by: James Wellwood Mushet

Minister of Mines
- In office December 1945 – 16 January 1948
- Prime Minister: Jan Christian Smuts
- Preceded by: Charles Frampton Stallard
- Succeeded by: Jan Hendrik Hofmeyr

Minister of Transport
- In office 16 January 1948 – 4 June 1948
- Prime Minister: Jan Christian Smuts
- Preceded by: Frederick Claud Sturrock
- Succeeded by: Paul Oliver Sauer

Member of the House of Assembly
- In office 12 June 1929 – October 1938
- Constituency: South Peninsula
- In office 11 January 1943 – 22 April 1970
- Constituency: Claremont (1943–1953); Constantia (1953–1970)

Personal details
- Born: 4 June 1896 Sydenham, Kent, England
- Died: 8 August 1976 (aged 80) Cape Town, South Africa
- Party: South African; United
- Education: Westminster School

Sidney Frank Waterson (June 4, 1896 – August 8, 1976) was a British-born South African politician and diplomat. He held several cabinet posts, served as a member of the House of Assembly and as High Commissioner to the United Kingdom.

== Early life ==
Born in Sydenham, Kent, the son of the architect John Waterson and his wife, Louisa Charlotte Hughes, Sidney Waterson was taken to South Africa as a child, then returned for his education, at St Clare School, Walmer and Westminster School, where he was a King's Scholar.

He joined the British Army in 1915 (the Royal Sussex Regiment), was seconded to the Machine Gun Corps in 1917, and saw service in Salonika and France. He ended the war as a lieutenant with the 63rd (Royal Naval) Division.

== Career ==
Returning to South Africa after the war, Waterson went into business as a wine merchant. He was elected to the House of Assembly in 1929 for South Peninsula for the South African Party (later the United Party), holding the seat until October 1938. In January 1939, he was sidelined by J. B. M. Hertzog as a result of his criticisms of the government's neutralist policies and was appointed South African minister to France.

Shortly after the outbreak of the Second World War in September 1939, the new prime minister Jan Smuts transferred him to London as High Commissioner from the Union of South Africa, serving until he was recalled back in 1942. He returned to the House of Assembly on 11 January 1943 in by-election for Claremont, replacing retiring Richard Stuttaford while also succeeding him as Minister of Commerce and Industry, which was renamed to Ministry of Economic Development on 7 July 1943. Following the end of the wartime cabinet in 1945, Waterson succeeded Dominion MP Charles Frampton Stallard as Minister of Mines. During the cabinet reshuffle in January 1948, he became a Minister of Transport while relinquishing the Ministry of Mines to Jan Hendrik Hofmeyr and Ministry of Economic Development to James Wellwood Mushet. He lost his ministrial post after the United Party's defeat in the 1948 election.

He served as the opposition's chief financial spokesman for two decades. As the Claremont constituency was abolished, he moved to the newly created constituency of Constantia and held its seat until his retirement in 1970. In early 1954, he was made convener of a UP commission of inquiry into the non-White, which recommended to support economical integration and political rights extensions to non-Whites. In 1957, he advocated for a creation of a multiratial senate with veto power. At the 1959 United Party Union Congress held in Bloemfontein, he was one of the fourteen UP members to oppose a resolution which ended further land purchases for the settlement of Blacks. He soon fell back into the party line in an effort to not splinter the party, but the disagreement would result in the creation of the Progressive Party.

== Personal life and family ==
He served as president of the Cape Chamber of Commerce. In 1947, he accompanied the British royal family on their tour through the Union.

On 16 April 1924 he married Hilda Maud (Betty) Markus (1893–1980), daughter of Major John Alfred Eugene Markus and Maud Markus, and they had a son, Michael, and a daughter, Priscilla. Hilda Markus had served as a nurse in the Anglo-French Red Cross Society during the First World War. During the Second World War, she founded and chaired the South African Voluntary Service and was also a representative of the South African Red Cross in London.
