= Stuttafords =

South African department store chain

- Industry: Retail
- Founded: 1858; 168 years ago in Cape Town, South Africa
- Defunct: August 1, 2017; 9 years ago
- Fate: Liquidated
- Headquarters: Johannesburg, South Africa
- Area served: South Africa, Botswana and Namibia
- Number of employees: 950 (2017)

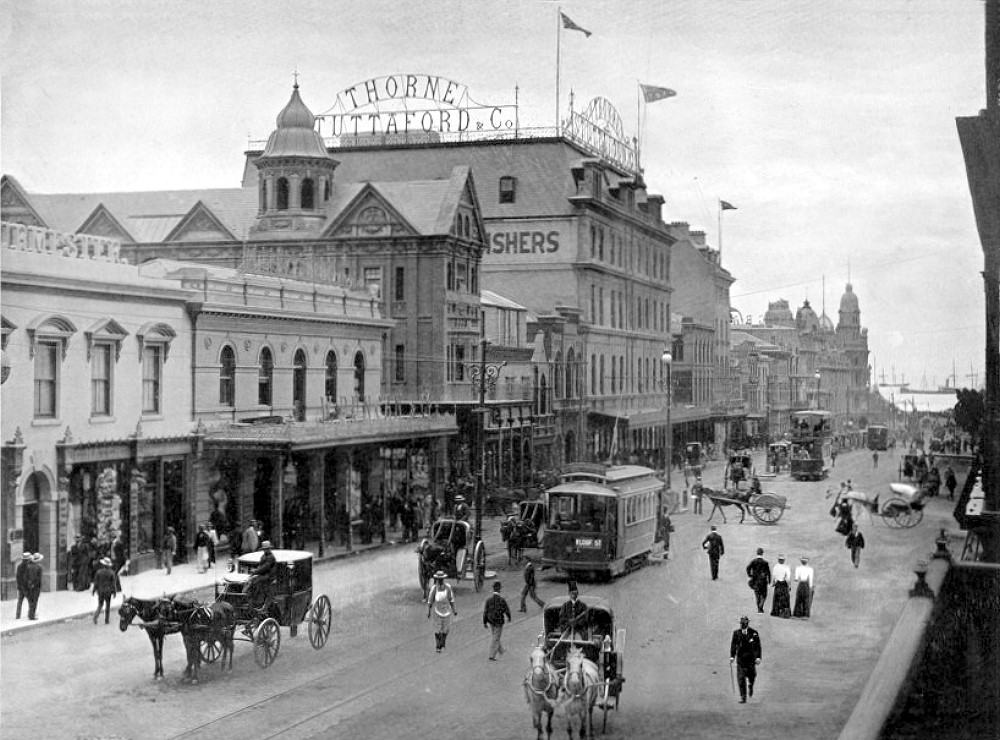
Adderley Street in c. 1897, with Thorne, Stuttaford & Co. store, middle

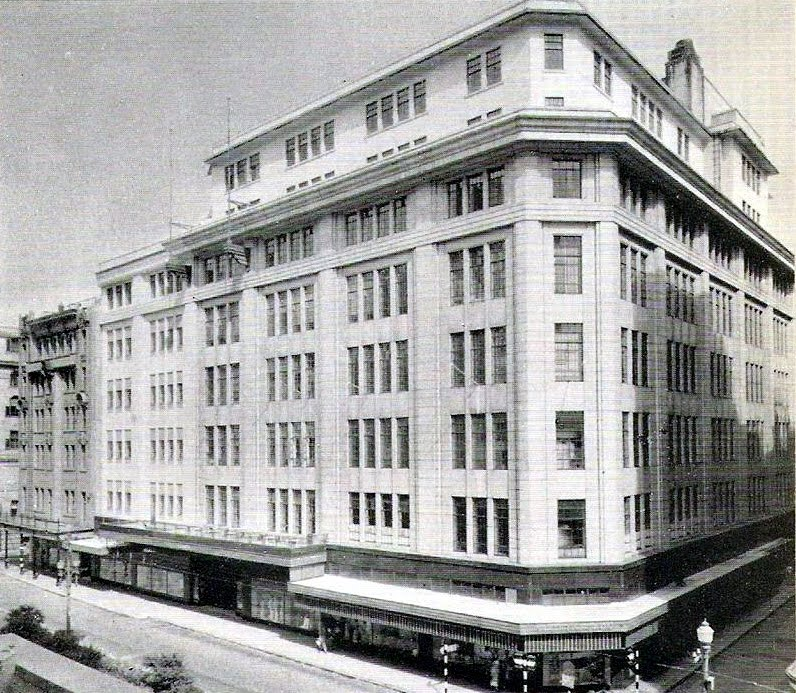
Stuttafords Cape Town 1957

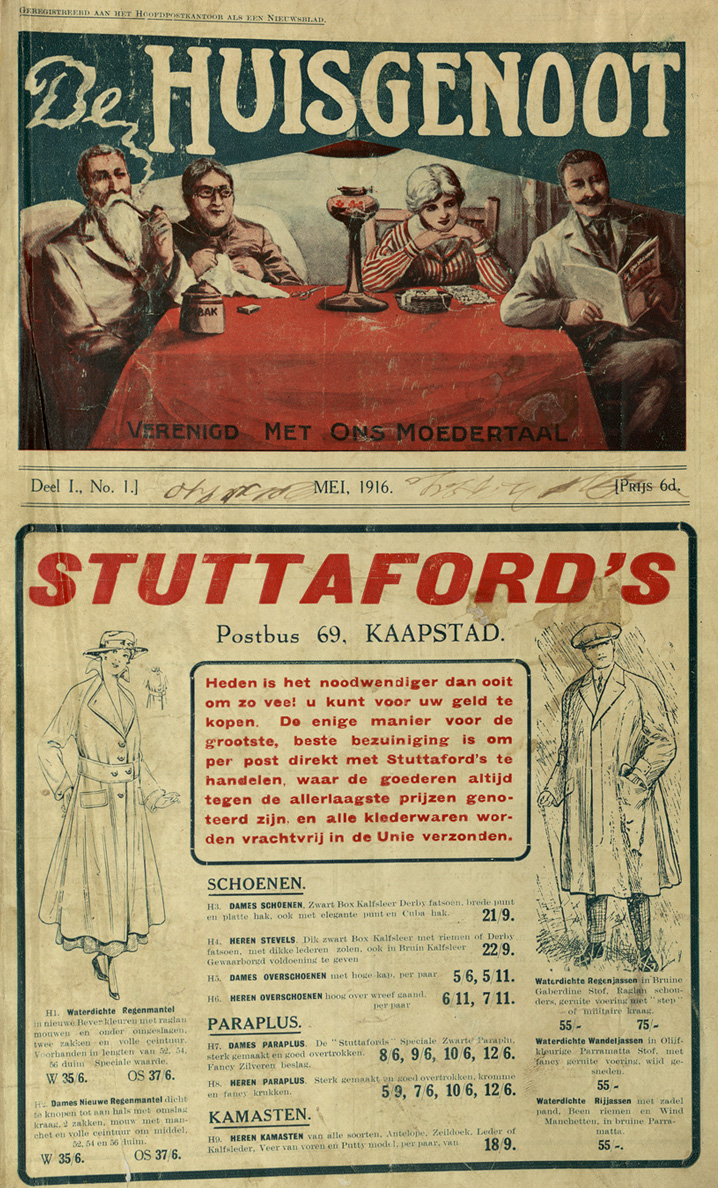
1916 Stuttafords ad printed in Standard Dutch (before Afrikaans replaced it) in Die Huisgenoot magazine

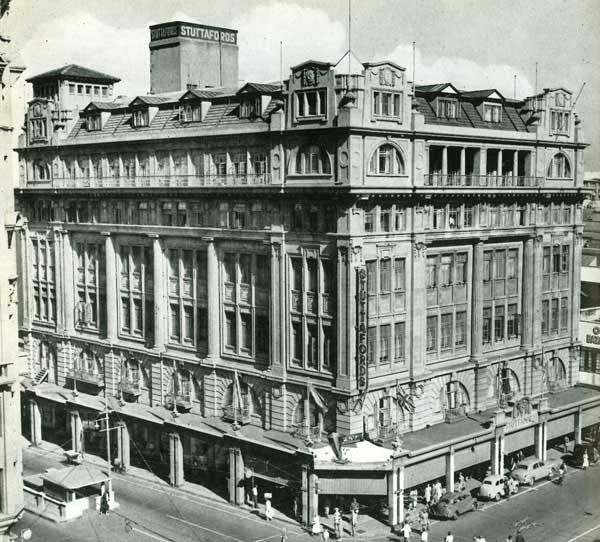
Stuttafords, West at Field streets, Durban, 1926

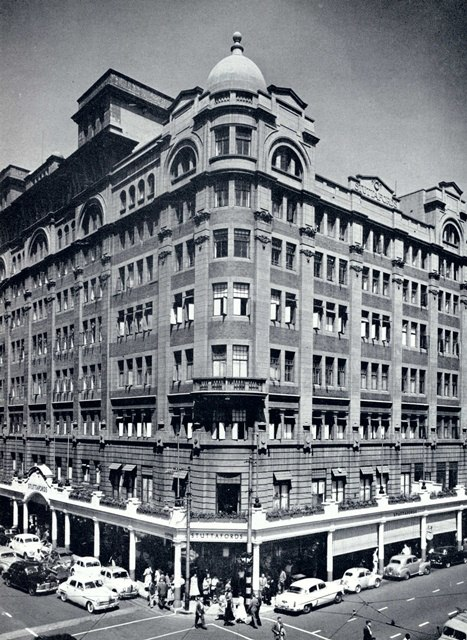
Stuttafords, Rissik at Pritchard streets, Johannesburg in 1957

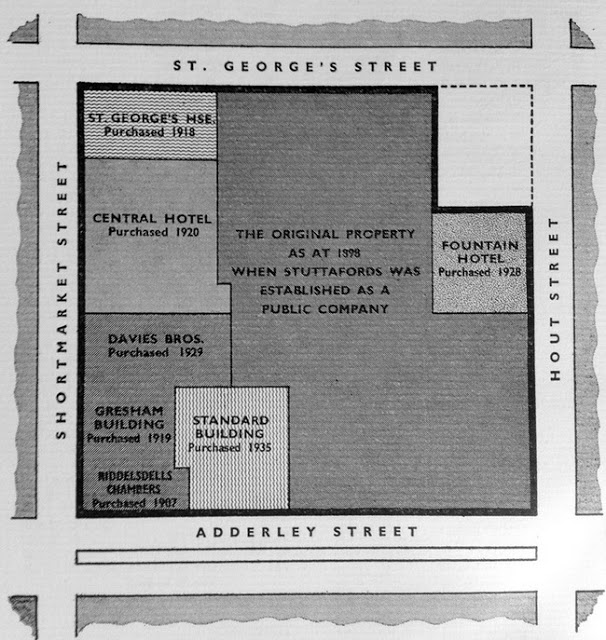
How the Stuttafords Cape Town Adderley Street flagship store grew over time with additions

Stuttaford's was a chain of upscale department stores in South Africa, Botswana and Namibia that operated for 159 years from 1858 through 2017. It was nicknamed the "Harrods of South Africa". At closing it had seven stores in South Africa, two in Botswana, and one in Namibia. It continues to operate in Namibia only.

== History ==
Founder Samson Rickard Stuttaford opened his first shop in 1857 in Cape Town city centre. His son was Richard Stuttaford (b. 1870) was a prominent businessman and entered the firm in 1886. In 1859 Povall & Stuttaford was established. In 1868 the company Thorne, Stuttaford & Co. was established in collaboration with William Thorne. In 1898, Stuttafords became a listed company.

Durban saw its first Stuttafords open in 1926. Its main Cape Town store at the corner of Adderley and Hout streets, opened in 1938, was designed by in-house Harrods architect Louis David Blanc, echoing the style of the London department store's buildings.

In 1978, Graham Beck's Kangra Holdings bought Stuttafords, which at that point had five stores, for 12 million rand. On 24 August 1979 the company was delisted from the stock exchange. Beck stripped the assets, selling the transport and warehousing operations for 10 million rand.

In 1983 he sold the Durban branch to Garlicks. In 1986 he sold Stuttaford's 45% share in Cavendish Square shopping centre. in 1987 he sold the Cape Town Adderley Street flagship store to Unidev for 11 million rand. The store closed 18 April 1987.

In 1987, what remained of Stuttafords, which by then also included the remaining John Orr's and Garlicks store branches, was sold to Greatermans, another department store, which was part of Kirsh Trading, later Tradegro. The John Orr's and Garlicks branches were rebranded Stuttafords which then had 8 branches. Pepkor acquired Stuttafords in 1992 along with Ackermans, Checkers and Cashbuild. In 1998 Pepkor announced that it planned to sell Stuttafords and focus on its core business, serving low- to lower-middle-income consumers. In 2000, taking control in a deal worth 106 million rand were: the management (35%) and staff (15%) of Stuttafords, and African Merchant Bank Private Equity Partners (AMB PEP, 50%): AMB PEP would later sell to the store management.

In 2000 Stuttafords moved from a model of a complete traditional staid department store to that of a contemporary, specialty department store focusing on apparel, cosmetics and "soft" home goods such as bed and bath linens.

In 2008, under CEO Marco Cicoria, the store pivoted again, aiming to be the country's leading retailer selling international upmarket brands such as Tommy Hilfiger, Ted Baker, Gap and Banana Republic. This proved to be fatal when in 2015 an economic crisis and reduction in the value of the rand versus the U.S. dollar (on top of a 45% import duty) made the upmarket products extremely expensive in the local currency. Attempts at a bailout failed and in July 2017 the chain closed, except for the Windhoek, Namibia store which was sold off and remains in operation. The company was wind up and unlisted on 1 August 2017.

== Cape Town flagship store ==
The store at Adderley and Hout streets was the largest and grandest, and formed the central shopping district together with other now-closed department stores such as Garlicks and Fletcher & Cartwright's. In 1957, 993 employees worked here both in the retail store operation and in the head office.

The flagship was a complete department store, as opposed to the smaller department stores focusing on apparel and soft home goods that it would operate starting around the turn of the 21st century. As of 1970, the flagship carried:

- Women's and men's apparel and accessories
- Cosmetics, childrenswear, Luggage
- Home crafts: dress fabrics, paper patterns, sewings, notions, trimmings, buttons, wools, needlework
- Home furnishings: carpets, furniture, bedding, some sports, fabrics, lamps, towels, napery, linens, blankets, dinnerware, ornaments, glassware, cutlery, ovenware, kitchenware, hardware, gardening, electrical, radios, gifts, candles
- Sundries: curios, photography-related, stationery, books, records;
- Gourmet food hall selling groceries, frozen goods, fish, cakes, sweets, and smokers' requisites

There were two restaurants: Adderley Restaurant and the self-serve Bird Cage restaurant. There were additional concession spaces.

== Branches ==
In 2006, Stuttafords had the most stores in its history, 22 in total. In 2009, to restructure to international standards, it closed smaller stores in Somerset West, Woodhill and Hyde Park. Some other stores were downsized or closed before liquidation in 2017, as shown in the table.

Source: John Marwood, The History of Stuttafords Department Stores

Country/ Province/ Metro. area	Community	Shopping centre	Opened	Closed	Sq m upon closing in 2017, if applicable
SOUTH AFRICA
Western Cape (formerly part of Cape Province)
CAPE TOWN; M. M.	Cape Town CBD	Adderley Street	1938	April 18, 1987	
CAPE TOWN; M. M.	1938 building at SW corner of Adderley and Hout, through to St Georges Mall. 33.9227763°S 18.4214175°E Extended in phases to include most of the block south to Shortmarket.				
CAPE TOWN; M. M.	Century City	Canal Walk		May 2017	4,336
CAPE TOWN; M. M.	Claremont	Cavendish Square	September 7, 1972	2016	
CAPE TOWN; M. M.	March 2013 "Stuttafords Emporium" launched here, 60% larger than the original store.				
CAPE TOWN; M. M.	Belville	Tygervalley Centre	2014		
CAPE TOWN; M. M.	Somerset West		2009		
GAUTENG (formerly part of Transvaal)
JOHANNESBURG; M. M.	Johannesburg CBD	SE Corner of Rissik and Pritchard streets 26.2033888°S 28.0418928°E	1893/1897	June 16, 1973	
JOHANNESBURG; M. M.	First branch 1893, rebuilt 1897. 10-story building in Pritchard Street erected 1903. Adjacent 6-story building erected in Rissik Street 1928/9. Building semi-abandoned until 2016, now site of Stuttafords House flats.				
JOHANNESBURG; M. M.	Sandton	Sandton City	August 1973		6,299
JOHANNESBURG; M. M.	4,645 m^{2} upon opening (2 sales levels of 1,858 m^{2} each and one service basement of 929 m^{2}). 6,299 m^{2} upon closing in 2017.				
JOHANNESBURG; M. M.	Roodepoort	Clearwater Mall		May 2017	3,095
JOHANNESBURG; M. M.	Rosebank	Oxford Corner	1958	1977	
JOHANNESBURG; M. M.	Rosebank	Rosebank Mall (1st store)	October 25, 1977	1983	
JOHANNESBURG; M. M.	Replaced freestanding streetfront store at Oxford Corner.				
JOHANNESBURG; M. M.	Rosebank	Rosebank Mall (2nd store)	July 31, 2014	May 2017	2,409
JOHANNESBURG; M. M.	Bedfordview	Eastgate Shopping Centre		2017	5,637
JOHANNESBURG; M. M.	Hyde Park	Hyde Park Mall		2009	
JOHANNESBURG; M. M.	Randburg - Cresta	Cresta Shopping Centre			
PRETORIA and Tshwane M. M.	Menlyn	Menlyn Park		2017	2,580
PRETORIA and Tshwane M. M.	Brooklyn	Brooklyn Mall		May 2017	
PRETORIA and Tshwane M. M.	"Boutique" store"				
PRETORIA and Tshwane M. M.	Woodhill	Woodlands Boulevard Shopping Complex		2009	
KWAZULU-NATAL (formerly Natal)
DURBAN and eThekwini M. M.	Durban Central	NW corner West and Field streets (today Joe Slovo & Dr Pixley Kaseme); 29.8586860°S 31.0218430°E	1926	1983	
DURBAN and eThekwini M. M.	1983 became a Garlicks; as of July 2020, occupied on ground floor by Markham, Bradlows, and "Garlicks Chambers"				
DURBAN and eThekwini M. M.	uMhlanga	Gateway Theatre of Shopping	2009	2017	3,795
DURBAN and eThekwini M. M.	Replaced Musgrave Centre				
DURBAN and eThekwini M. M.	La Lucia	La Lucia Mall			
DURBAN and eThekwini M. M.	Westville	The Pavillion		2017	2,440
PIETERMARITZBURG				1984	
Lease taken over by John Orr's
BOTSWANA
GABORONE		Gamecity Lifestyle Shopping Mall		2017	
GABORONE		Airport Junction Shopping Centre		2017	
KENYA
NAIROBI	Dagoretti	The Junction Mall	2005	March 2007	
Originally about 30 employees, later fell to around 15
NAMIBIA
WINDHOEK		Maerua Mall		(open)	---
Sold in June 2017 to a 3rd party. Still operating as of July 2020.

== Bibliography ==
- (Book) Stuttaford & Co. Ltd., Gill Fraser (ed.), The Story of Stuttafords, Cape Press, 1957. 55 pp.
- (E-book) Marlow, John (2016), The History of Stuttafords Department Stores of South Africa 1858 - 2017: Expansion, Takeovers, Makeovers, Collapse, ASIN B01A8979Q0
