= Jan van Eck =

South African politician and mediator (1943–2009)

Member of the House of Assembly
- In office 1986–1994
- Constituency: Claremont (from 1987); Rondebosch (until 1987)

Personal details
- Born: 18 December 1943 Holland, Netherlands
- Died: 27 January 2009 (aged 65) Constantia, Cape Town; Western Cape, South Africa
- Citizenship: South Africa
- Party: African National Congress (since 1992); Democratic Party (1989–1992); Progressive Federal Party (until 1987)

Jan van Eck (18 December 1943 – 27 January 2009) was a Dutch–South African politician who served in opposition in the South African House of Assembly from 1986 to 1994. He represented the Progressive Federal Party from 1986 to 1987 and the Democratic Party from 1989 to 1992; at other times, he sat as an independent.

An opponent of apartheid, he left the Democratic Party to join the African National Congress (ANC) in 1992. After South Africa's democratic transition, he briefly represented the ANC in the National Assembly in 1994, but he left to become involved in peacemaking in Burundi, where he worked for over a decade as an independent mediator in the Burundian civil war.

== Early life and education ==
Van Eck was born on 18 December 1943 in Holland, the eldest of five siblings. His mother was a housewife and his father was a classical piano teacher, and they moved to South Africa when van Eck was five years old. He matriculated at Bonnievale High School in the Cape Province in 1961 and enrolled at Stellenbosch University, where he completed a bachelor's in geography and history in 1964, a teaching diploma in 1965, and an honours degree in geography in 1965.

While at university, van Eck joined the opposition Progressive Party, and Colin Eglin recruited him to campaign among Afrikaans students in the Cape, initially as founding editor of the party's Afrikaans-language journal, Deurbraak ("breakthrough"). Over the next two decades he held a variety of positions in the public relations unit of the party and its successors, the Progressive Reform Party and the Progressive Federal Party (PFP). He stood unsuccessfully for election to Parliament in 1974 and to the provincial council in 1977, before he was elected to the provincial council in 1981, representing the PFP in Groote Schuur, Cape Town.

== Apartheid-era Parliament ==
In a 1986 by-election, van Eck joined the House of Assembly, becoming the PFP's representative in the Rondebosch constituency. The following year, he was elected as the representative for Claremont, also in Cape Town. In August of that year, he resigned from the PFP and sat as an independent until the 1989 general election, when he won re-election as a candidate for the newly established Democratic Party (DP).

Van Eck supported the United Democratic Front (UDF) and had links to the Dutch anti-apartheid movement. He was also among a group of DP members who advocated for stronger ties to the African National Congress (ANC), the majority-black anti-apartheid organisation then banned inside South Africa. In July 1989, he was among a white delegation that met with ANC leaders in Lusaka, Zambia, during a summit organised by the Five Freedoms Forum. In April 1992, van Eck and four other DP members – David Dalling, Jannie Momberg, Pierre Cronjé, and Robert Haswell – announced that they were defecting from the DP to join the ANC. In a joint statement, the group said that they were responding to a call made by Nelson Mandela shortly after his release from prison in 1990, for "all our white compatriots to join us in the shaping of a new South Africa". Van Eck and the others remained in Parliament as independents for the rest of the legislative term.

Both as a DP representative and as an independent, van Eck was known for using Parliament as a platform for questioning the executive about its treatment of anti-apartheid activists. He advocated without success for an inquiry into the disappearance of Stanza Bopape. On 2 June 1992, the NP moved to suspend van Eck from Parliament because he had claimed that the government was responsible for the deaths of a large number of black activists. According to the Hansard, van Eck responded:

Mr Speaker, I stand up not to even attempt to reply to the sham allegation made against me in the two minutes that I am allowed. I shall stand here in silence for two minutes on behalf of myself and my four colleagues as a mark of respect for the thousands of South Africans on all sides who died during the apartheid war. I request hon[ourable] members to observe this silence of two minutes.

He was subsequently ordered to leave the chamber and serve a two-month suspension.

== Post-apartheid Parliament ==
The next general election in 1994 was held under universal suffrage with the ANC's participation, and van Eck was elected to an ANC seat in the new National Assembly. However, he resigned from his seat later the same year.

== Peacemaking in Burundi ==
Van Eck left Parliament in order to join the fledgling peace process in the Burundian civil war, which dominated his attention for the next decade. He was initially involved as an independent consultant to the Cape Town-based Centre for Conflict Resolution; he later became a consultant to the Pretoria-based Institute for Security Studies, heading the institute's Political Dialogue Project in Burundi. Although he collaborated with the peace-making initiatives of the South African government, he was highly critical of the government's high-pressure mediation method.

The Rotary Foundation awarded him a Paul Harris Fellowship "in appreciation of tangible and significant assistance given for the furtherance of better understanding and friendly relations among peoples of the world".

== Personal life and death ==
Van Eck was married to Eunice, with whom he had two other children. He had another son before the marriage. He died of a heart attack at Constantia Medi Clini on 27 January 2009, aged 65.
