= Bechuanaland (House of Assembly of South Africa constituency) =

Former electoral district of the House of Assembly in South Africa

- Betsjoeanaland
- Former constituency for the South African House of Assembly
- Province: Cape of Good Hope
- Electorate: 6,135 (1933)

Former constituency
- Created: 1910
- Abolished: 1938
- Number of members: 1
- Last MHA: P. J. du Plessis (UP)
- Replaced by: Vryburg

Bechuanaland (Afrikaans: Betsjoeanaland) was a constituency in the Cape Province of South Africa, which existed from 1910 to 1938. It covered a rural area along the border with Botswana, centred on the town of Vryburg, and shared both its name and much of its territory with the former Crown colony of British Bechuanaland. Throughout its existence it elected one member to the House of Assembly and one to the Cape Provincial Council.

== Franchise notes ==
When the Union of South Africa was formed in 1910, the electoral qualifications in use in each pre-existing colony were kept in place. The Cape Colony had implemented a “colour-blind” franchise known as the Cape Qualified Franchise, which included all adult literate men owning more than £75 worth of property (controversially raised from £25 in 1892), and this initially remained in effect after the colony became the Cape Province. As of 1908, 22,784 out of 152,221 electors in the Cape Colony were “Native or Coloured”. Eligibility to serve in Parliament and the Provincial Council, however, was restricted to whites from 1910 onward.

The first challenge to the Cape Qualified Franchise came with the Women's Enfranchisement Act, 1930 and the Franchise Laws Amendment Act, 1931, which extended the vote to women and removed property qualifications for the white population only – non-white voters remained subject to the earlier restrictions. In 1936, the Representation of Natives Act removed all black voters from the common electoral roll and introduced three “Native Representative Members”, white MPs elected by the black voters of the province and meant to represent their interests in particular. A similar provision was made for Coloured voters with the Separate Representation of Voters Act, 1951, and although this law was challenged by the courts, it went into effect in time for the 1958 general election, which was thus held with all-white voter rolls for the first time in South African history. The all-white franchise would continue until the end of apartheid and the introduction of universal suffrage in 1994.

== History ==
Like many rural constituencies across the Cape, Bechuanaland was a conservative seat with a largely Afrikaans-speaking electorate. After voting for the South African Party in 1910 and 1915, it was taken by the National Party in 1921, and the NP held it throughout the remainder of its existence. In 1938 it was replaced by the new seat of Vryburg, and its final MP, P. J. du Plessis, stood for and won the Vryburg constituency for the new United Party.

== Members ==
Election	Member	Party
1910	D. H. W. Wessels	South African
1915	D. H. W. Wessels	South African
1920	Max Sonnenberg	South African
1921	I. van Wijk Raubenheimer	National
1924	I. van Wijk Raubenheimer	National
1929	I. van Wijk Raubenheimer	National
1933	P. J. du Plessis	National
1934	P. J. du Plessis	United
1938	constituency abolished	

== Detailed results ==
=== Elections in the 1910s ===
General election 1910: Bechuanaland
Party	Candidate	Votes	%	±%
South African	D. H. W. Wessels	Unopposed		
South African win (new seat)				

General election 1915: Bechuanaland
Party	Candidate	Votes	%	±%
South African	D. H. W. Wessels	1,668	56.1	N/A
National	J. J. Booysen	1,303	43.9	New
Majority		365	12.2	N/A
Turnout		2,971	73.3	N/A
South African hold		Swing	N/A	

=== Elections in the 1920s ===
General election 1920: Bechuanaland
Party	Candidate	Votes	%	±%
South African	Max Sonnenberg	1,324	51.6	−4.5
National	I. van Wijk Raubenheimer	1,242	48.4	+4.5
Majority		82	3.2	−9.0
Turnout		2,566	73.9	+0.6
South African hold		Swing	-4.5	

General election 1921: Bechuanaland
Party	Candidate	Votes	%	±%
National	I. van Wijk Raubenheimer	1,365	50.7	+2.3
South African	Max Sonnenberg	1,327	49.3	−2.3
Majority		38	1.4	N/A
Turnout		2,692	72.7	−0.8
National gain from South African		Swing	+2.3	

General election 1924: Bechuanaland
Party	Candidate	Votes	%	±%
National	I. van Wijk Raubenheimer	1,299	53.2	+1.3
Independent	P. H. de Kock	1,098	45.0	New
Rejected ballots		43	1.8	N/A
Majority		199	8.2	N/A
Turnout		2,440	79.7	+7.0
National hold		Swing	N/A	

General election 1929: Bechuanaland
Party	Candidate	Votes	%	±%
National	I. van Wijk Raubenheimer	1,665	53.7	+0.5
South African	P. A. Fraenkel	1,378	44.4	New
Rejected ballots		58	1.9	N/A
Majority		287	9.3	N/A
Turnout		3,101	84.0	+2.4
National hold		Swing	N/A	

=== Elections in the 1930s ===
General election 1933: Bechuanaland
Party	Candidate	Votes	%	±%
National	P. J. du Plessis	2,631	54.2	+0.5
Independent	P. H. de Kock	2,183	44.9	New
Rejected ballots		44	0.9	-1.0
Majority		448	9.2	N/A
Turnout		4,858	79.2	−4.8
National hold		Swing	N/A	
