= Simonstown (House of Assembly of South Africa constituency) =

- Simonstad
- Former constituency for the South African House of Assembly
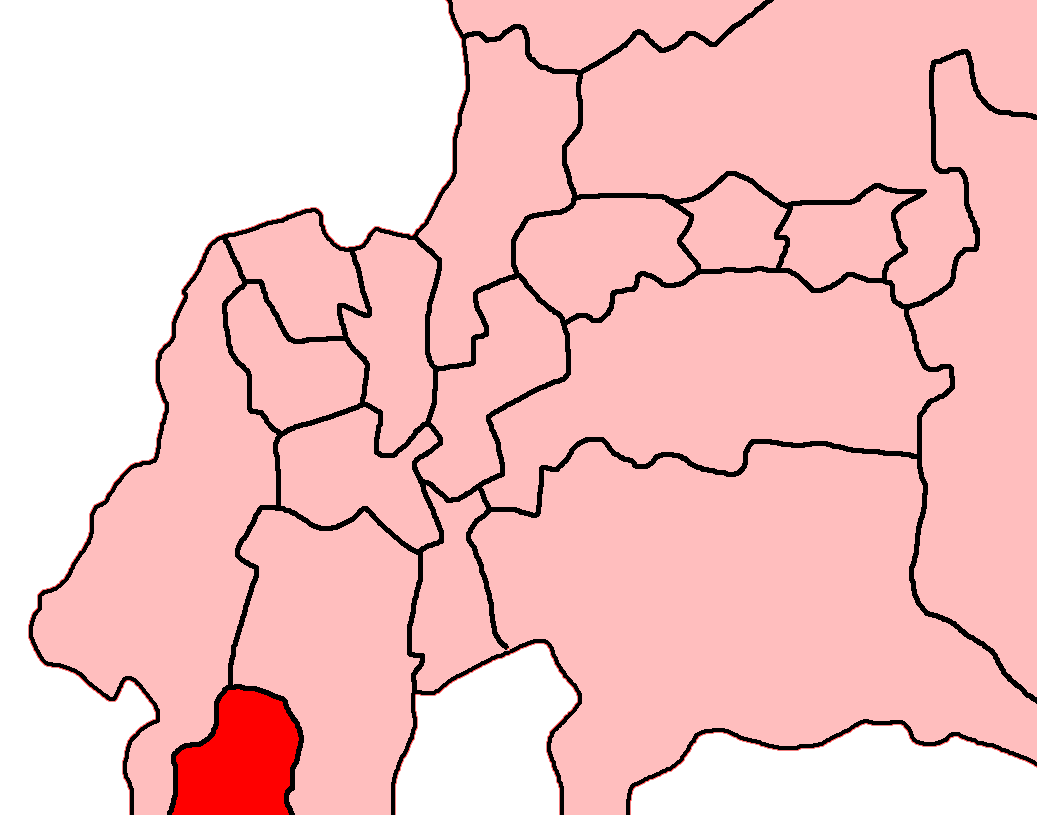
- Location of Simonstown within Cape Town (1981)
- Province: Cape of Good Hope
- Electorate: 22,060 (1989)

Former constituency
- Created: 1958
- Abolished: 1994
- Number of members: 1
- Last MHA: Jannie Momberg (Ind)
- Created from: South Peninsula
- Replaced by: Western Cape

Simonstown (Afrikaans: Simonstad) was a constituency in the Cape Province of South Africa, which existed from 1958 to 1994. Named for the naval port of Simon’s Town (the one-word and two-word spellings of the town’s name are both accepted, but the constituency name was generally spelled as one word), it covered roughly the southern half of the Cape Peninsula. Throughout its existence it elected one member to the House of Assembly and one to the Cape Provincial Council.

== Franchise notes ==
When the Union of South Africa was formed in 1910, the electoral qualifications in use in each pre-existing colony were kept in place. The Cape Colony had implemented a "colour-blind" franchise known as the Cape Qualified Franchise, which included all adult literate men owning more than £75 worth of property (controversially raised from £25 in 1892), and this initially remained in effect after the colony became the Cape Province. As of 1908, 22,784 out of 152,221 electors in the Cape Colony were "Native or Coloured". Eligibility to serve in Parliament and the Provincial Council, however, was restricted to whites from 1910 onward.

The first challenge to the Cape Qualified Franchise came with the Women's Enfranchisement Act, 1930 and the Franchise Laws Amendment Act, 1931, which extended the vote to women and removed property qualifications for the white population only – non-white voters remained subject to the earlier restrictions. In 1936, the Representation of Natives Act removed all black voters from the common electoral roll and introduced three "Native Representative Members", white MPs elected by the black voters of the province and meant to represent their interests in particular. A similar provision was made for Coloured voters with the Separate Representation of Voters Act, 1951, and although this law was challenged by the courts, it went into effect in time for the 1958 general election, which was thus held with all-white voter rolls for the first time in South African history. The all-white franchise would continue until the end of apartheid and the introduction of universal suffrage in 1994.

== History ==
Simonstown was created in 1958, and replaced the former South Peninsula constituency on more or less a one-for-one basis. Like the rest of Cape Town’s southern suburbs, its electorate were generally English-speaking and wealthy; however, they tended to be slightly more politically conservative than their neighbours. The first MP for Simonstown, Lewis Charles Gay, had previously represented South Peninsula since 1949, and held the seat until 1966.

His successor, former cricketer John Wiley, was one of the most conservative members of the United Party, and when the UP leadership moved to merge with the Progressive Party in the 1970s (a process that eventually created the Progressive Federal Party), Wiley and a group of fellow conservatives left to create the South African Party. As one of only three SAP candidates to hold their seats in the 1977 general election, Wiley became leader of the party, and led it to a merger with the governing National Party in 1980. Wiley became the only native English-speaker in P. W. Botha's cabinet, serving from 1982 until his death by gunshot (most likely self-inflicted) in the run-up to the 1987 general election. The Nationals held Simonstown by a hair’s breadth, but in 1989, the Democratic Party retook the seat for the liberal opposition. Its last member, Jannie Momberg, was expelled from the DP in 1992 and joined the African National Congress, continuing to represent Simonstown as an independent until the seat’s abolition in 1994.

== Members ==
Election	Member	Party
1958	Lewis Gay	United
1961	Lewis Gay	United
1966	John Wiley	United
1970	John Wiley	United
1974	John Wiley	United
1977	John Wiley	SAP
1980	John Wiley	National
1981	John Wiley	National
1987	L. H. M. Dilley	National
1989	Jannie Momberg	Democratic
1992	Jannie Momberg	Ind-ANC
1994	constituency abolished	
