= Claremont (House of Assembly of South Africa constituency) =

Constituency in the Cape Province of South Africa

- Former constituency for the South African House of Assembly
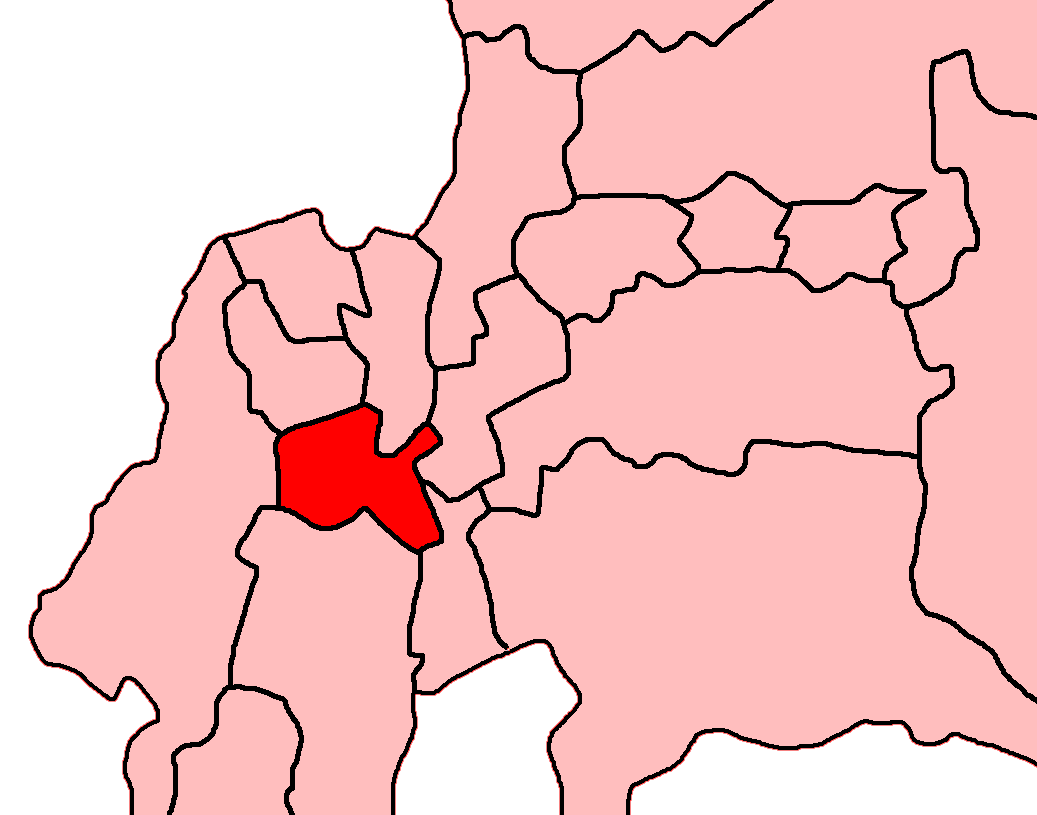
- Location of Claremont within Cape Town (1981)
- Province: Cape of Good Hope
- Electorate: 16,891 (1989)

Former constituency
- Created: 1933
- Abolished: 1994
- Number of members: 1
- Last MHA: Jan van Eck (DP)
- Created from: Newlands
- Replaced by: Western Cape

Claremont was a constituency in the Cape Province of South Africa, which existed from 1933 to 1953 and again from 1981 to 1994. It covered parts of Cape Town’s southern suburbs, centred on its namesake suburb of Claremont. Throughout its existence it elected one member to the House of Assembly and one to the Cape Provincial Council.

== Franchise notes ==
When the Union of South Africa was formed in 1910, the electoral qualifications in use in each pre-existing colony were kept in place. The Cape Colony had implemented a "colour-blind" franchise known as the Cape Qualified Franchise, which included all adult literate men owning more than £75 worth of property (controversially raised from £25 in 1892), and this initially remained in effect after the colony became the Cape Province. As of 1908, 22,784 out of 152,221 electors in the Cape Colony were "Native or Coloured". Eligibility to serve in Parliament and the Provincial Council, however, was restricted to whites from 1910 onward.

The first challenge to the Cape Qualified Franchise came with the Women's Enfranchisement Act, 1930 and the Franchise Laws Amendment Act, 1931, which extended the vote to women and removed property qualifications for the white population only – non-white voters remained subject to the earlier restrictions. In 1936, the Representation of Natives Act removed all black voters from the common electoral roll and introduced three "Native Representative Members", white MPs elected by the black voters of the province and meant to represent their interests in particular. A similar provision was made for Coloured voters with the Separate Representation of Voters Act, 1951, and although this law was challenged by the courts, it went into effect in time for the 1958 general election, which was thus held with all-white voter rolls for the first time in South African history. The all-white franchise would continue until the end of apartheid and the introduction of universal suffrage in 1994.

== History ==
Like most of Cape Town’s southern suburbs, Claremont was largely English-speaking and liberal. In its first iteration, it replaced the Newlands constituency, and former Newlands MP Richard Stuttaford was elected unopposed for Claremont. He would represent the seat until his retirement from politics in 1942, at which point former South Peninsula MP Sidney Waterson was elected to replace him. In 1953, the suburb of Claremont was moved out of the seat, and it was renamed Constantia to reflect this. Waterson would continue to represent the new seat for many years.

Claremont was recreated in 1981, out of parts of Constantia and Rondebosch (the latter having been abolished that year). The new Claremont seat was similar to the old one, and retained its liberal politics – its first MP was Frederik van Zyl Slabbert, leader of the Progressive Federal Party, who had previously represented Rondebosch. Slabbert left parliamentary politics in 1986, frustrated by his inability to fight apartheid from within, but the PFP and its successor the Democratic Party continued to hold the seat until the last apartheid-era election in 1989.

In 1992, the seat's last MP, Jan van Eck, was part of a group of DP MPs who defected to the African National Congress, although they were treated as independents for parliamentary purposes.

== Members ==
Election	Member	Party
1933	Richard Stuttaford	South African
1934	Richard Stuttaford	United
1938	Richard Stuttaford	United
1943	Sidney Waterson	United
1948	Sidney Waterson	United
1953	constituency abolished	

Election	Member	Party
1981	Frederik van Zyl Slabbert	PFP
1986 by	Jan van Eck	PFP
1987	Jan van Eck	PFP
1989	Jan van Eck	Democratic
1992	Jan van Eck	Ind-ANC
1994	constituency abolished	

== Detailed results ==
=== Elections in the 1930s ===
General election 1933: Claremont
Party	Candidate	Votes	%	±%
South African	Richard Stuttaford	Unopposed		
South African win (new seat)				

General election 1938: Claremont
Party	Candidate	Votes	%	±%
United	Richard Stuttaford	4,104	66.2	N/A
Dominion	E. M. O. Clough	2,052	33.1	New
Rejected ballots		47	0.7	N/A
Majority		2,052	33.1	N/A
Turnout		6,203	74.1	N/A
United hold		Swing	N/A	

=== Elections in the 1940s ===
Claremont by-election, 11 January 1943
Party	Candidate	Votes	%	±%
United	Sidney Frank Waterson	Unopposed		
United hold				
