= Foreshore Place =

Skyscraper in Cape Town

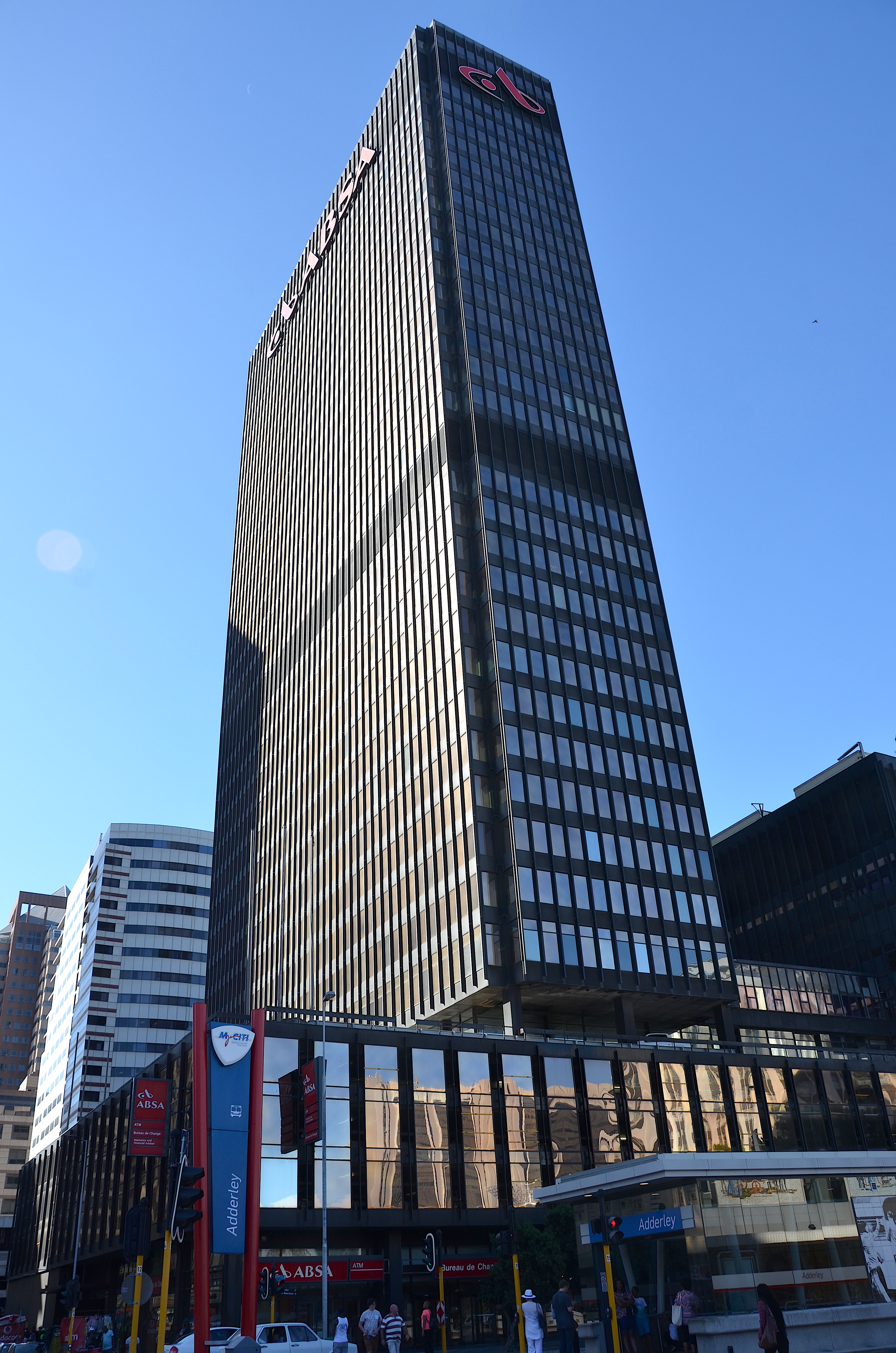
- Foreshore Place, showing the old ABSA branding. In front is the Adderley MyCiTi BRT station
- Interactive map of the Foreshore Place area

General information
- Location: Cape Town, South Africa
- Coordinates: 33°55′13″S 18°25′28″E
- Completed: 1970

Height
- Roof: 117 m (384 ft)

Foreshore Place (formerly the ABSA Centre) is a mixed-use skyscraper in Adderley Street, a major roadway in Cape Town CBD, in Cape Town, South Africa.

== History ==
The mixed-use tower was completed in 1970 as Trust Bank Centre, with half of the building offices and half containing the Heerengracht Hotel. It was later purchased by the predecessor to the ABSA banking group and converted to offices, known as ABSA Centre, while the hotel portion became the Hotel on St Georges. In 2019, the building was redeveloped as premium mixed-use residential and office space and renamed Foreshore Place.

== Description ==
The building is 117 metres (384 ft) tall. It consists of a four-storey podium and a 29-storey tower block characterised by a concrete central core. Its continuous glass curtain wall façades were the first of their kind in Cape Town.
