= William Thorne (mayor of Cape Town) =

Mayor of Cape Town (1839–1917)

Sir William Thorne
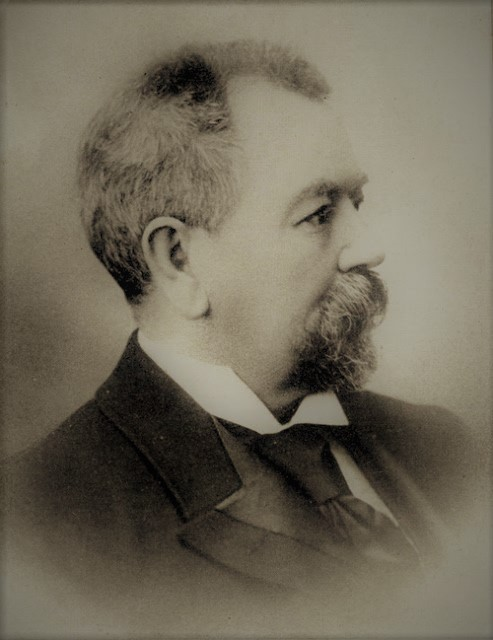

Mayor of Cape Town
- In office 1901–1904
- Preceded by: Thomas J. O'Reilly
- Succeeded by: Hyman Liberman

Personal details
- Born: 27 January 1839 Neyland, Pembrokeshire, Wales
- Died: 28 March 1917 (aged 78) Rondebosch, Union of South Africa
- Spouse: Ellen Lane
- Children: 5

Sir William Thorne (27 January 1839 – 28 March 1917) was a draper, milliner and businessman in Cape Town. He was also an active civil servant and Mayor of Cape Town.

== Early life ==
Thorne was born in Pembrokeshire, Wales and as a young man, served his apprenticeship with West End drapers and outfitters and gained his experiences in the drapery business, while he worked at Harvey Nichols in London. In 1860 he emigrated to the Cape Colony.

== Business life ==
Shortly after his arrival at the Cape, Thorne joined the brothers Samson and William Stuttaford, who operated as drapers and haberdashers named, Povall & Stuttaford, in Darling Street in Cape Town. In 1867, diamonds were discovered in the northern region of the Cape Colony and in 1868, Samson Stuttaford temporarily went on his own, but William Stuttaford and Thorne continued trading under the title of Thorne, Stuttaford and Co.

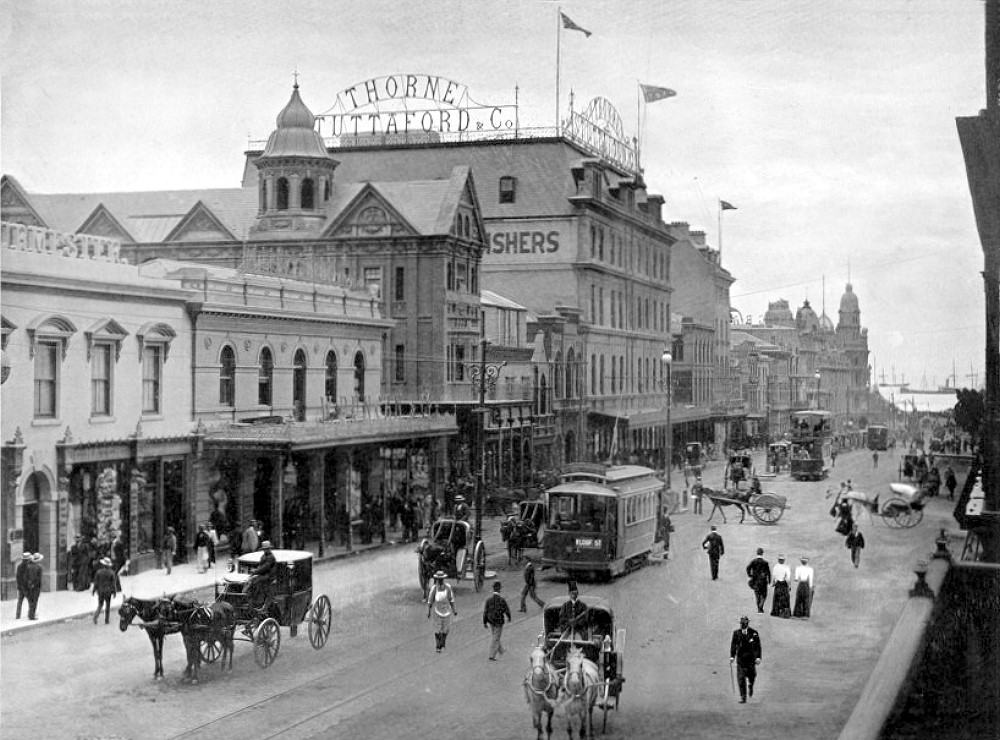
Adderley Street in ca. 1897, with Thorne, Stuttaford & Co. store, middle

In 1872 Samson visited Kimberley in order to assess the diamond industry and shortly thereafter he and Thorne established the firm of S.R. Stuttaford and Co. in Adderley Street, Cape Town and began to deal in diamonds. They bought a prime property in Cape Town on which their flagship store was built, and they devised a contract between them so that the partnership could function in South Africa and in London.

Soon after the diamonds, came the discovery of gold in the Transvaal and Thorne travelled to the gold fields to assess the situation. He was initially unsure about expanding the business to the Transvaal, but by 1892 a branch was established in Johannesburg. The company would later become known as, Stuttafords and became the leading department store in South Africa.

== Civic life ==
In public life, Thorne became chairman of the Liesbeeck Corporation and thereafter mayor of Rondebosch. In August 1893 he became a Cape Town city councillor and served as Mayor of Cape Town, from 1901 to 1904. As a representative of the Progressive Party, he was a member of the Legislative Assembly from 1904 to 1910.

Thorne was knighted in 1904 for his business success and for his long experience in and dedication to civic affairs. He married Ellen Lane and had five children, and his oldest son, William John Thorne, became Mayor of Cape Town in 1918. Thorne died at his home called Rusdon in Rondebosch on 28 March 1917.
