= Constantia (House of Assembly of South Africa constituency) =

- Former constituency for the South African House of Assembly
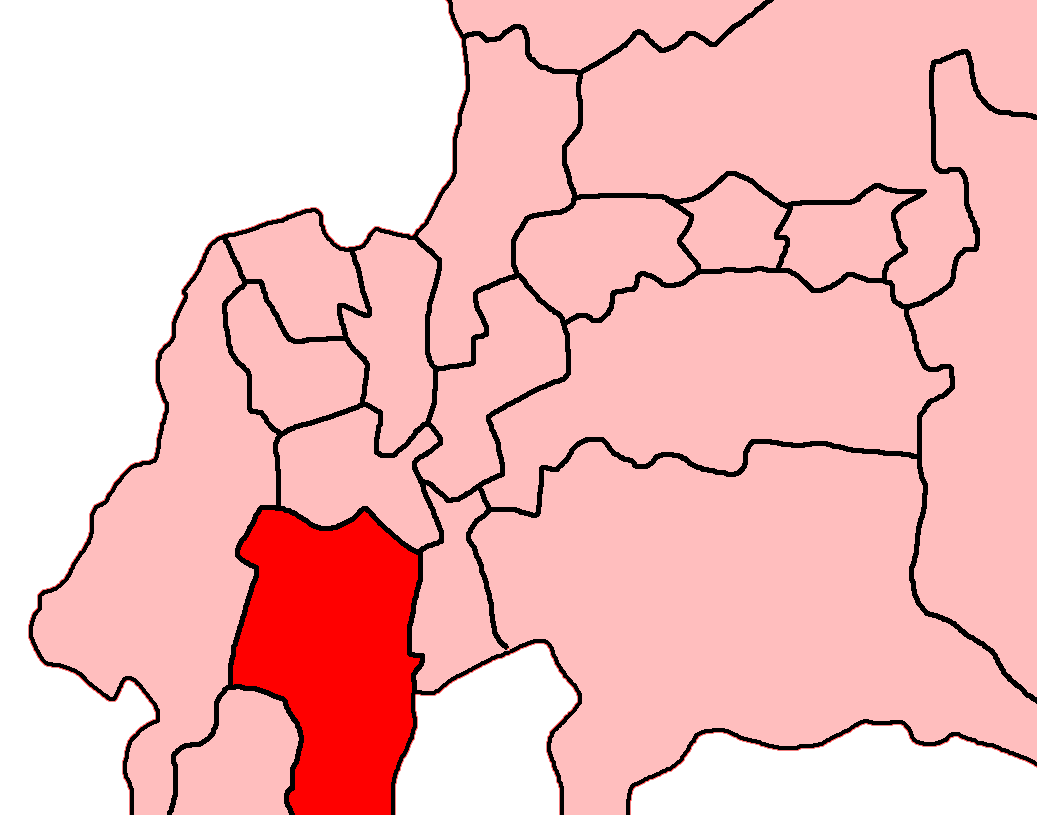
- Location of Constantia within Cape Town (1981)
- Province: Cape of Good Hope
- Electorate: 20,543 (1989)

Former constituency
- Created: 1953
- Abolished: 1994
- Number of members: 1
- Last MHA: Roger Hulley (DP)
- Created from: Claremont
- Replaced by: Western Cape

Constantia was a constituency in the Cape Province of South Africa, which existed from 1953 to 1994. Named after the suburb of Constantia, and by extension the Groot Constantia winery, it covered parts of Cape Town’s southern suburbs. Throughout its existence it elected one member to the House of Assembly and one to the Cape Provincial Council.

== Franchise notes ==
When the Union of South Africa was formed in 1910, the electoral qualifications in use in each pre-existing colony were kept in place. The Cape Colony had implemented a "colour-blind" franchise known as the Cape Qualified Franchise, which included all adult literate men owning more than £75 worth of property (controversially raised from £25 in 1892), and this initially remained in effect after the colony became the Cape Province. As of 1908, 22,784 out of 152,221 electors in the Cape Colony were "Native or Coloured". Eligibility to serve in Parliament and the Provincial Council, however, was restricted to whites from 1910 onward.

The first challenge to the Cape Qualified Franchise came with the Women's Enfranchisement Act, 1930 and the Franchise Laws Amendment Act, 1931, which extended the vote to women and removed property qualifications for the white population only – non-white voters remained subject to the earlier restrictions. In 1936, the Representation of Natives Act removed all black voters from the common electoral roll and introduced three "Native Representative Members", white MPs elected by the black voters of the province and meant to represent their interests in particular. A similar provision was made for Coloured voters with the Separate Representation of Voters Act, 1951, and although this law was challenged by the courts, it went into effect in time for the 1958 general election, which was thus held with all-white voter rolls for the first time in South African history. The all-white franchise would continue until the end of apartheid and the introduction of universal suffrage in 1994.

== History ==
Like most of Cape Town’s southern suburbs, Constantia was largely English-speaking and liberal. It was created in 1953, replacing the seat of Claremont, and its first MP was Sidney Waterson of the United Party, who had previously represented Claremont. Waterson would remain the local MP until his retirement in 1970, and the United Party held the seat until its dissolution in 1977. At that point, Constantia was won by the Progressive Federal Party, which (along with its successor the Democratic Party) held it until its abolition.

== Members ==
Election	Member	Party
1953	Sidney Waterson	United
1958	Sidney Waterson	United
1961	Sidney Waterson	United
1966	Sidney Waterson	United
1970	D. D. Baxter	United
1974	D. D. Baxter	United
1977	I. F. A. de Villiers	PFP
1981	R. R. Hulley	PFP
1987	R. R. Hulley	PFP
1989	R. R. Hulley	Democratic
1994	constituency abolished	
