= Cavendish Square (shopping centre) =

Shopping centre in Cape Town, South Africa

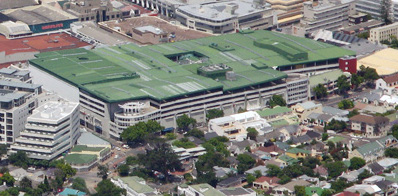
- An aerial view of Cavendish Square from Table Mountain
- Interactive map of Cavendish Square
- Alternative names: Cavendish

General information
- Type: Shopping mall
- Location: 1 Dreyer St, Claremont, Cape Town, 7708
- Coordinates: 33°58′49″S 18°27′48″E
- Opening: September 7, 1972; 53 years ago
- Owner: Old Mutual

Other information
- Number of stores: 190

Website
- cavendish.co.za

Cavendish Square, sometimes referred to as Cavendish, is a multi-story shopping mall located in the mixed-use suburb of Claremont, in the Southern Suburbs of Cape Town. Built in 1972, the center comprises 190 stores, and multiple floors of indoor parking.

As of December 2025, the mall receives an average of 1.2 million shoppers per month.

Major South African financial institution Old Mutual is the current owner of Cavendish Square, through its subsidiary, Old Mutual Property.

== History ==
The center was, at the time of being built, the largest upscale shopping center to open in Cape Town, and was a project of the now-shuttered Stuttafords department store chain.

Original Cavendish Square tenants included a full-line Stuttaford's store, a Greatermans department store, whose space was later taken by Garlicks. The centre opened September 7, 1972. It is a popular retail destination in the area, offering a wide range of shops, boutiques, restaurants, and entertainment options.

In 2023, the mall built a new pedestrianized trading area in Dreyer Street, situated between Cavendish Square and the Cavendish Connect building on the opposite side. The street, which was previously used by cars, had turned into an informal trading area over the years.

The new, formalized, modern pedestrian shopping area was part of broader mall renovations, and added roofing, built-in stores, utility links, and official signage, being called Dreyer Street Market.

== Operations ==
Current anchor tenants include Woolworths, Cotton On, H&M, Mr Price, Clicks, Pick n Pay, and Sportsmans Warehouse.

Cavendish Square also hosts the Made in the Cape Artisans Market.

== Gallery ==
Cavendish Square shopping center
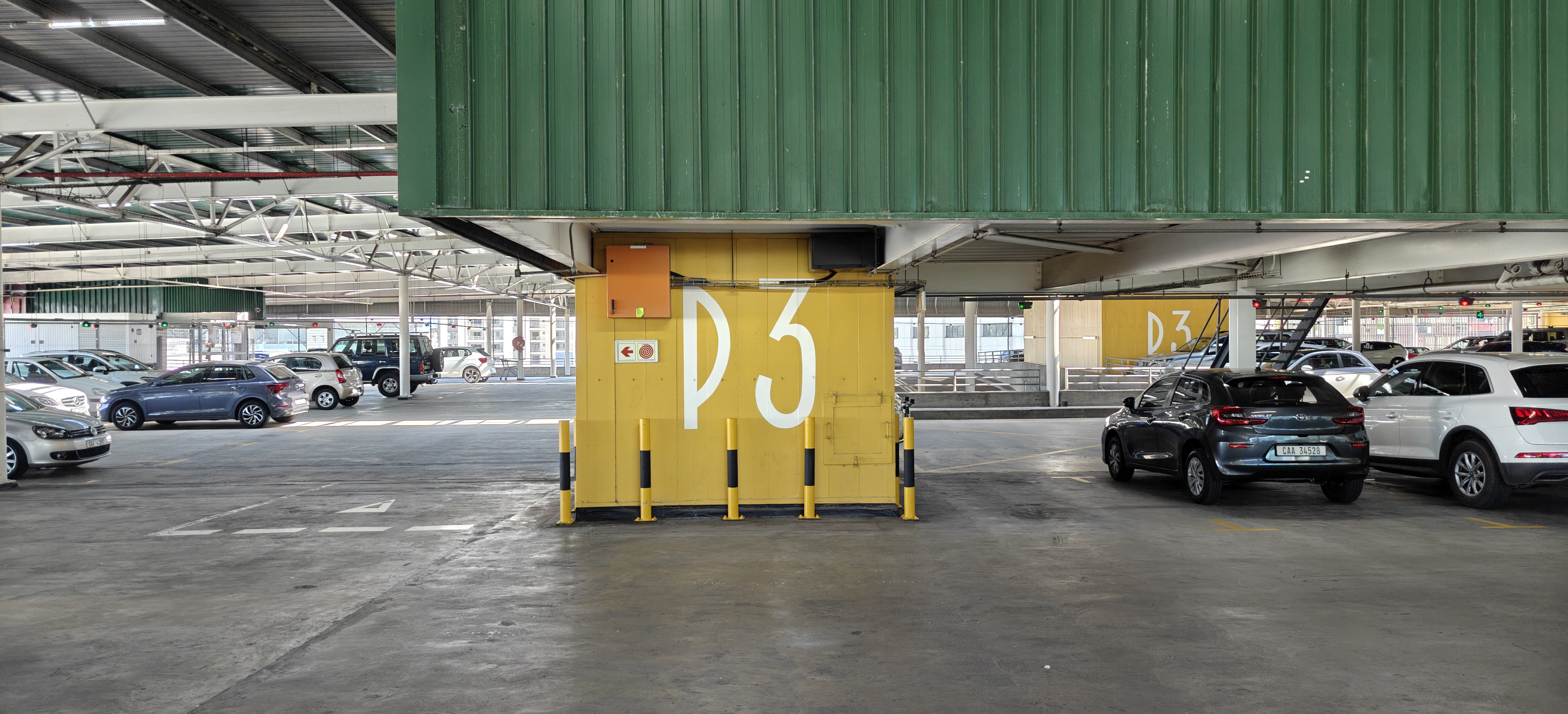
Third floor parking

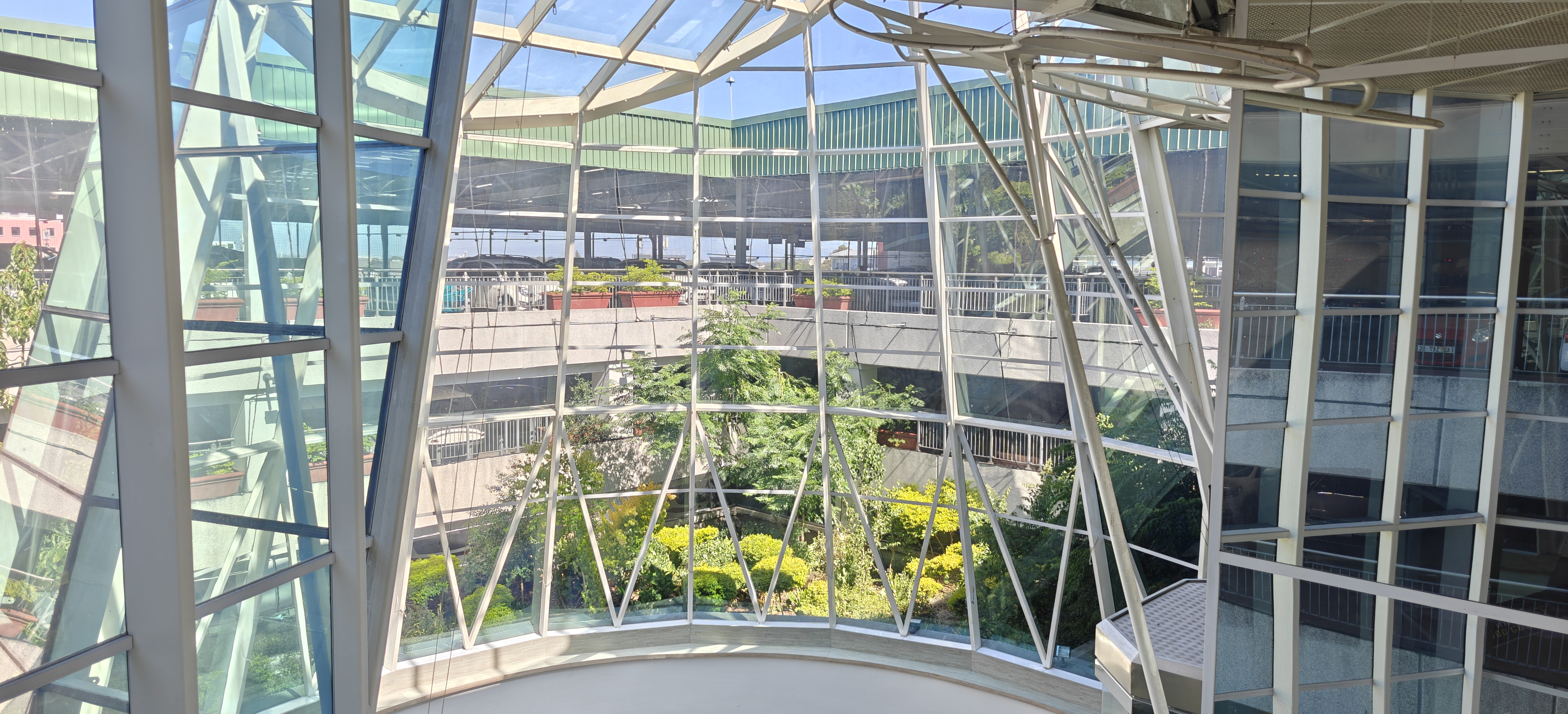
The mall's atrium, with plants outside and elevators and parking pay area to the right

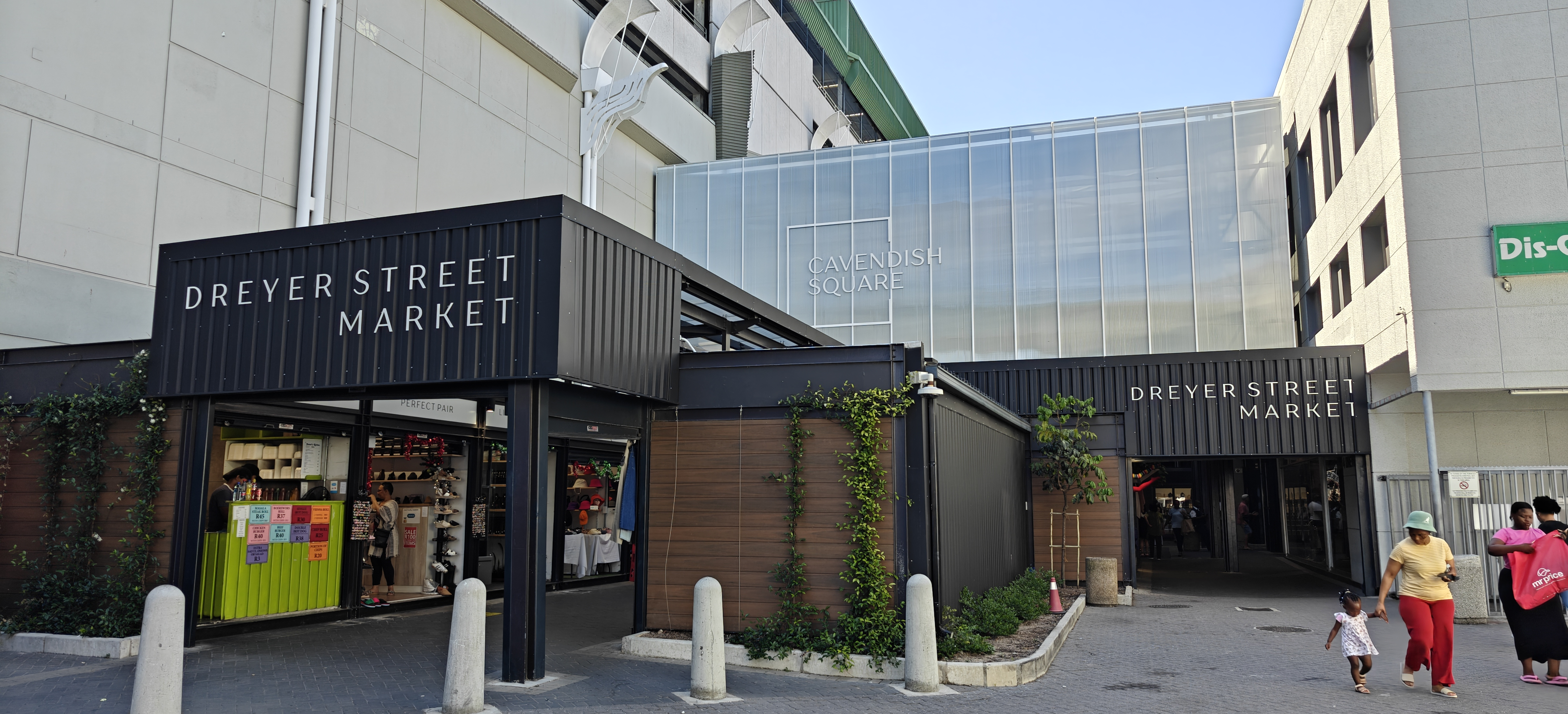
Dreyer Street Market, between Cavendish Square and Cavendish Connect
