= Gamecity Lifestyle Shopping Mall =

Shopping centre in Africa

Gamecity LifeStyle Shopping Mall
- Location within Botswana

General information
- Location: Gaborone, Botswana, Botswana
- Coordinates: 24.6864°S 25.8772°E

Gamecity LifeStyle Shopping Mall is a lifestyle shopping mall located in Gaborone, Botswana. Currently it has 126 shops, with more available by mid-2014.

The property is owned and managed by Turnstar Holdings Limited, Botswana.

Notable retailers include:

- Checkers Hyper - groceries
- Woolworths - groceries, clothing
- Edgars - clothing, cosmetics
- Mr. Price - clothing
- Choppies - information technology
- Toys "R" Us - toys
- Ster-Kinekor - movies

Stuttafords was previously an anchor department store until its closing in 2017.

Notable restaurants:

- KFC
- Wimpy
- Nando's

Notable banks:

- BancABC
- Barclays Bank
- First National Bank
- Stanbic Bank
- Standard Chartered Bank
