= Airport Junction Shopping Centre =

Shopping centre in Gaborone, Botswana

Coordinates: 24.6827684°S 25.8913538°E

Airport Junction Shopping Centre (also known as Airport Junction Mall) is a shopping centre in at the Airport Road and A1 in Gaborone, Botswana opened in April 2012.

The mall cost 469 million Botswana pula to build, with a retail space of 45,800 square metres (493,000 sq ft), making it one of the three largest shopping centres in Gaborone. The centre consists of four separate buildings. Anchors at the centre's launch included Shoprite supermarket, Edgars (department store), Builders Warehouse (in an outbuilding) and (closed in 2017) Stuttafords department store. Virgin Active fitness centre opened its first Botswana branch in 2015, Dischem, a large chemists (pharmacy) did the same in 2018, and Cotton On opened in 2019.
