= Neethlingshof Estate =

Wine estate in Western Cape, South Africa

Neetlingshof
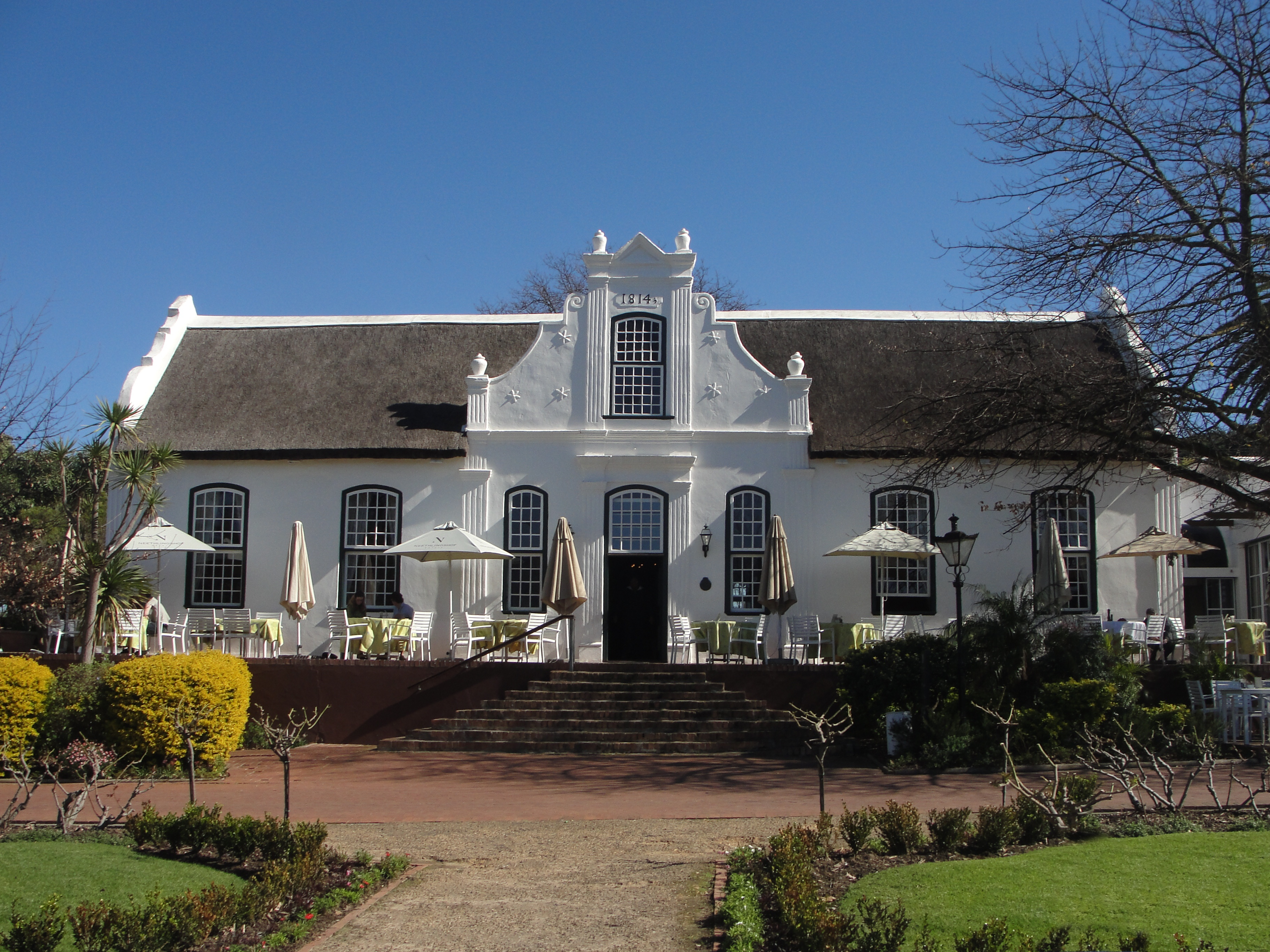

- Location within Western Cape
- 33°52′26″S 18°48′9″E
- Location: Stellenbosch, Western Cape, South Africa.

History
- Built: 17th century

Neetlingshof Estate is a wine estate in Stellenbosch, Western Cape, South Africa. Established in 1692, it is one of the oldest wine estates in the country, founded only six or seven years after the first estate, Constantia. Its current bottling dates back to 1880.

== History ==
Neethlingshof Wine Estate was founded in 1692 by the German settler Willem Barend Lubbe, on the Bottelary Hills. Lubbe named the estate “De Wolwedans” (‘The Dance of Wolves’), after the many jackals that lived in the hills at that time. Coming from Germany he thought these small creatures were wolves.

The farm exchanged hands numerous times until it landed upon Charles and Maria Marais. The pair had five children, two of whom died during infancy. Charles and Maria planted tobacco, expanded the vineyards and built the wine cellar. They are now celebrated as the most significant owners in the estate's history. When Charles died, Maria ensured that the manor house would be built to completion. When the construction ended in 1814 Maria decorated the gable of the manor with six flowers, representing herself and her children. The estate has since created a comemeritave wine, called "The Six Flowers". This wine is part of their Short Story Collection.

The name of the estate, Neetlingshof, comes from a former owner of the estate, Lord Neethling. His name lived on for many years as the estate's restaurant's title. The restaurant is now called The Salt Deli.

== Recent history ==
During the early years of the new millennium, the vineyards were renewed, much replanting was done, and a new system of water management was created. Winemaker Philip Constandius saw at the time “a huge potential for shiraz”, and he also said that pinotage showed more of its pinot noir characteristics here. A pinotage-malbec blend was envisioned at the time.

In 2002, the estate had two ranges, the Lord Neethling range, with three wines, all of which received at least four stars in the John Platter South African Wines 2003, and the Standard range, some of which also received four stars and even included a Gewürtztraminer, and a Weisser Riesling Noble Late Harvest, with botrytis enrichment, which was said to have received multiple awards.

In 2008, De Wet Viljoen was the winemaker along with Lauren Snyman. Viljoen started in this job in 2003, and Snyman in 2006. The replanting programme was half completed and expected to be finished by 2011, “already earning dividends”. The Weisser Riesling Noble Late Harvest was by now elevated to the Lord Neethling range, and earning the same 4 ½ stars as in 2002.

In 2012, Viljoen shared winemaking duties with Lauren Snyman. The Platter wine guide lauded the estate for keeping their Gewürtztraminer and Riesling vines, which in a dryland vineyard were said to be “valuable assets”. The top wine range had now been renamed the Short Story collection, and the Noble Late Harvest wine, now renamed Maria, had been upgraded to this top range. Maria is named after Maria Magdalena Marais, the resourceful and feisty young widow who took over the building of the Neethlingshof estate’s manor house after the death of her husband, Charles, in 1813. In 2022, the company was purchased by the Grands Chais de France Group. As of 2023, Mika Engelbrecht became the head winemaker, having studied beneath Viljoen.

== Conservation programme and reintroduction of spotted eagle-owls ==
The post-democracy era meant a boom for the wine industry in South Africa. Estates were enlarged, and production was going up. But this was bad for the biodiversity of the area, and at Neetlingshof a biodiversity and conservation programme was developed by master viticulturist, Prof. Eben Archer, who was commissioned to re-plan and replant nearly all of the vineyards on the Neetlingshof estate.

A better balance between planted areas and natural veld was sought after, and 116 ha or 42% of the farm has been set aside for conservation. In reconfiguring the lay-out of the farm, Prof. Archer allowed for islands of indigenous vegetation between the new vineyard blocks connected by corridors.

This had some unforeseen consequences. These interconnected “islands” would create an explosion in the number of mice foraging on the root systems of the vines. To resolve the situation, natural predators in the form of spotted eagle-owls were introduced. Vantage posts were erected in all the vineyards on which owls could perch while hunting at night. Given the abundance of food, owls soon established themselves in numbers in densely wooded areas on the farm.

As a result of the environmentally friendly farming practices, the number of beneficial insects also started to multiply. To control their numbers, helmeted guineafowl, for which they are a natural food source, were introduced. Their presence in turn attracted caracal from the hills of the adjoining conservancy. First spotted in 2008, they have moved into undisturbed wooded areas on the farm where they found safe breeding areas.

By 2011, the programme has now largely fallen to winemaker De Wet Viljoen to oversee and execute, but the programme had expanded as six other wineries, Alto, Lomond, Plaisir de Merle, Jacobsdal, Theuniskraal, and Uitkyk also joined the conservation programme.

The programme is also visible in the names of the wines of Neetlingshof. The flagship wine is now called The Owl Post, and it is made exclusively from pinotage. It earned four stars in the 2012 edition of Platter’s South African Wines. Another wine in the Short Story Collection is also named after a local animal, as it is called The Caracal. It earned 4 ½ stars in the Platter’s guide in 2012. It is a Bordeaux blend.
