= Adderley Street =

Major street in Cape Town CBD

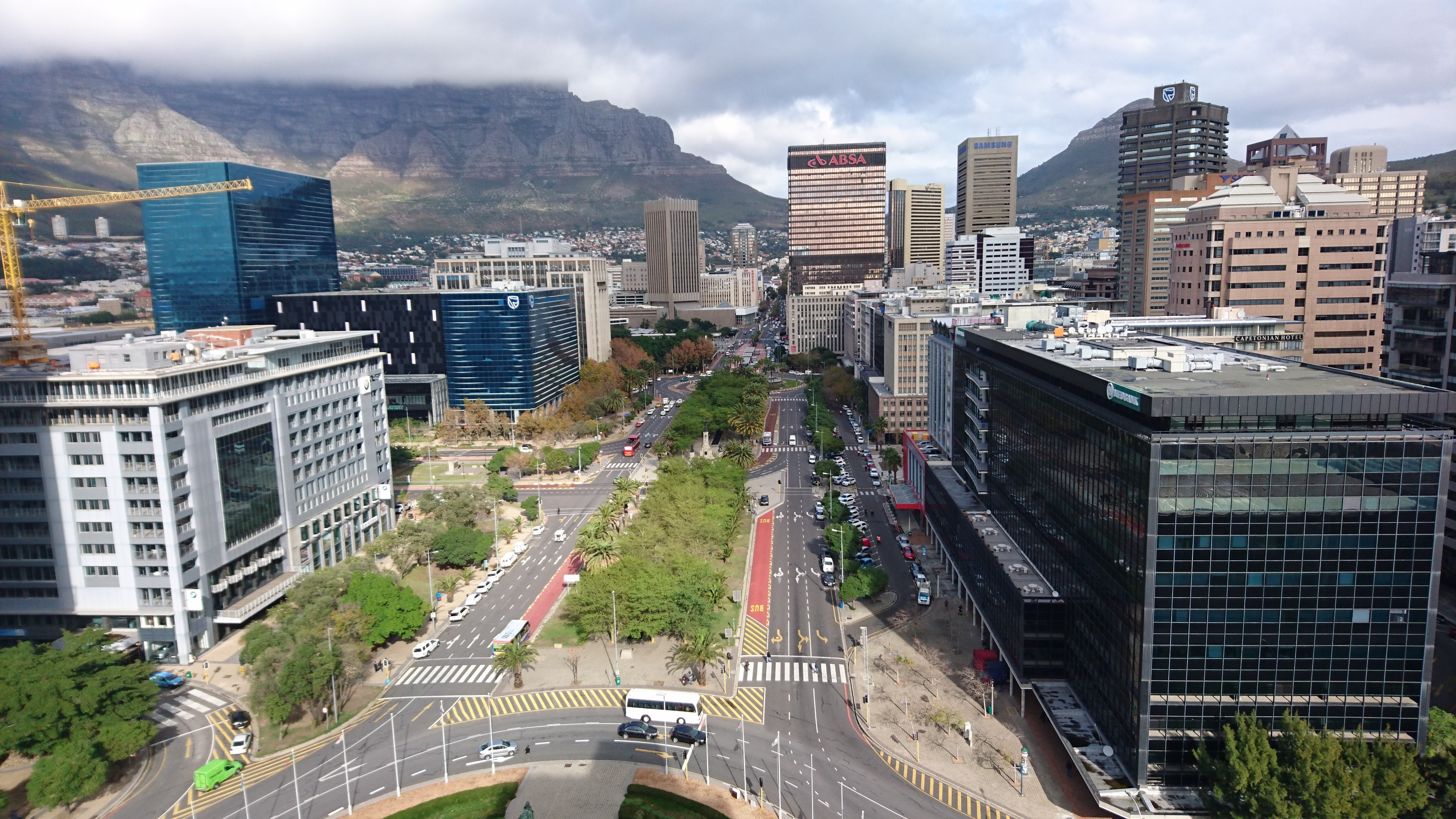
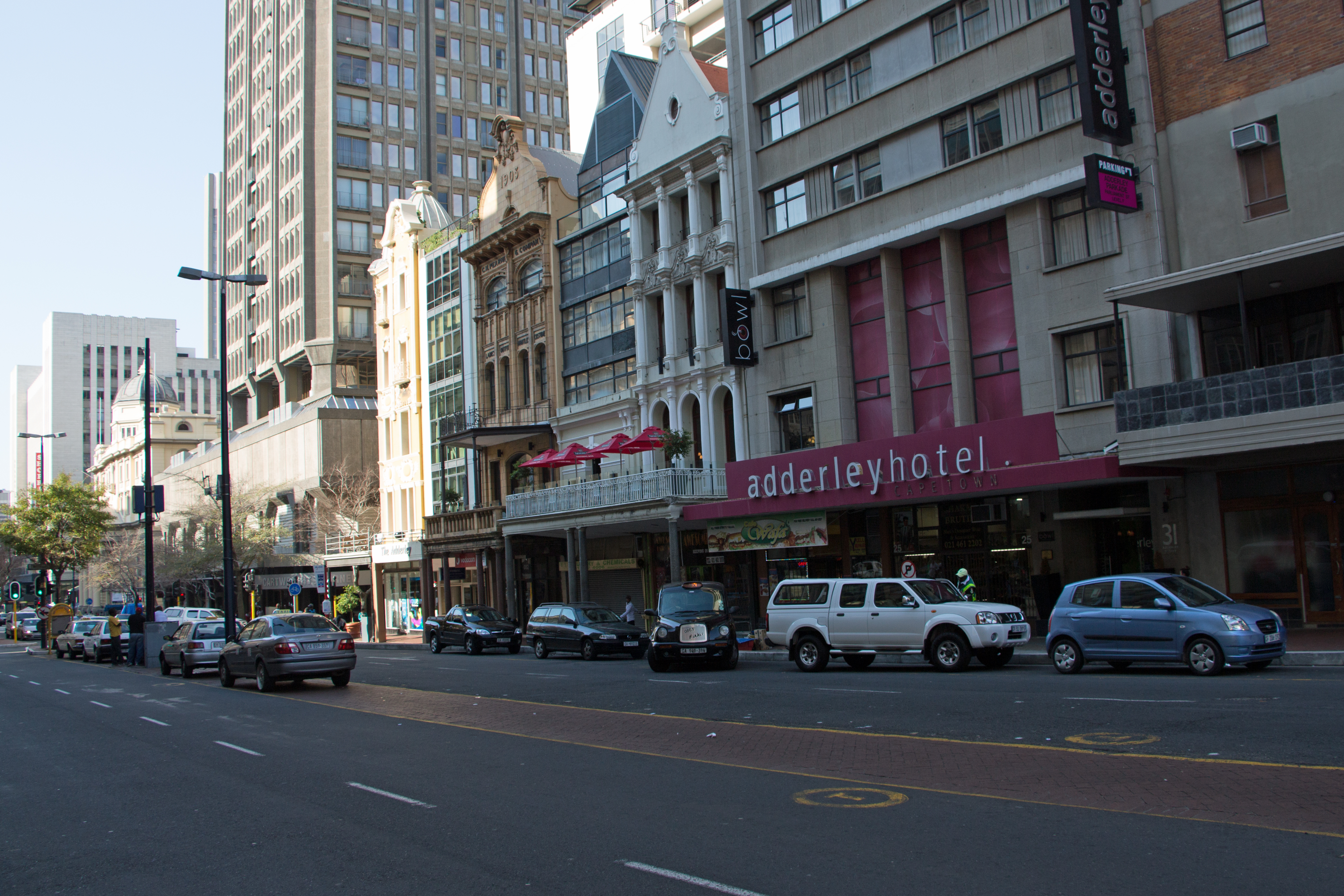
- Above: an aerial view down Adderley Street, with Table Mountain in the background. Below: a view of Adderley Street from ground level.

- Map of Adderley Street and surrounding streets.
- Location: Cape Town, South Africa
- Coordinates: 33°55′17″S 18°25′27″E

Adderley Street is a street in the central business district (CBD) of Cape Town, South Africa. It is considered the main street of the area.

The street bisects the CBD. It runs from the Parliament of South Africa at the south, past numerous office buildings and hotels, and becomes Heerengraght Street (the old main street of the CBD) at the north end, passing the Cape Town International Convention Centre, traveling under the N1 freeway, and terminating at the Port of Cape Town.

== History ==
The street was originally named Heerengracht, after the canal ("gracht") which ran down its centre, and which had its origins in the rivers from Table Mountain. At the time the street was more of a wide walkway beside the canal, which was crossed by various stone bridges.

The network of canals were covered over, throughout Cape Town, in the 1860s. The Heerengracht river and canal therefore became an underground pipe-line. For many years the street was residential, lined with large oak trees, but by 1850 it had become strongly commercial in character.

Mayor Hercules Jarvis named it Adderley Street in 1850, to honour British Parliamentarian Charles Bowyer Adderley (elevated to the peerage as Baron Norton in 1878) who fought successfully against the plan for the British government to make Cape Town into another penal colony.

Adderley Street was the original main street of the city centre shopping district with large department stores such as Stuttafords (SW corner of Hout Street, going through to St Georges Mall, now Edgars et al.), Garlicks (at Exchange Place across from Cape Town railway station), Fletcher & Cartwrights, and Thomas, Watson & Co. In the late 1800s the street was a "riot of ornament" along which around 150 retail shops plied their trade, many with wrought iron decorating the outsides of their buildings. The street remains a retail centre today, with branches of Woolworths, Edgars, Truworths and shopping centres such as the Golden Acre with Ackermans, Shoprite and Mr Price.

It also has long been a financial centre with the Colonial Bank located on the site of the Stuttafords Building until 1890, and the imposing Standard Bank Building on the east side at Hout Street. The upper end marked political and religious authority, the location of St. George's Cathedral and the Supreme Court of South Africa.

== Transport infrastructure ==
Most of Adderley Street features two lanes running in each direction, divided by a paved section with trees. Each side of the road is flanked by sidewalks for pedestrians (with numerous crosswalks along the street), and off-street parking. The left side of the road features a dedicated cycle lane.

The Adderley Street MyCiTi Bus Station, part of the City of Cape Town's bus rapid transit system, is located on Adderley Street, where it intersects with Riebeek Street. It is situated at the entrance of Cape Town Station, part of the city's Metrorail train network. The segment of the street around the BRT station features dedicated, specially-paved bus lanes on both sides. It is at this point that Adderley Street is its widest, at 8 lanes plus sidewalks.

== Parks ==
At the north end of Adderley Street is Company's Garden, a large public park that sits next to the Parliament of South Africa. Company's Garden is the oldest garden in South Africa, and a National Heritage Site.

At the point that Adderley Street becomes Heerengracht Street, in the middle of a large traffic circle, is Adderley Street Fountain, situated in the middle of a small public park that features palm trees.

== Landmarks ==
At the top of Adderley Street, next to the entrance to Company's Garden, is the Slave Lodge. Originally a slave lodge, it then became government offices, then the old Supreme Court of South Africa, and then its current form - the South African Cultural History Museum, which forms part of Iziko Museums of South Africa. It is one of the oldest buildings in Cape Town.

== Commerce ==
Adderley Street is home to numerous office buildings, including Foreshore Place (formerly ABSA Centre), which was completed in 1970, and is currently Cape Town's 6th tallest building.

== Gallery ==
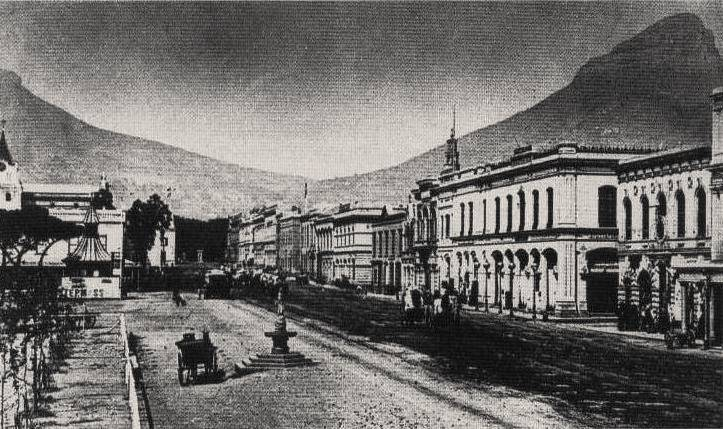
Adderley Street, 1870s

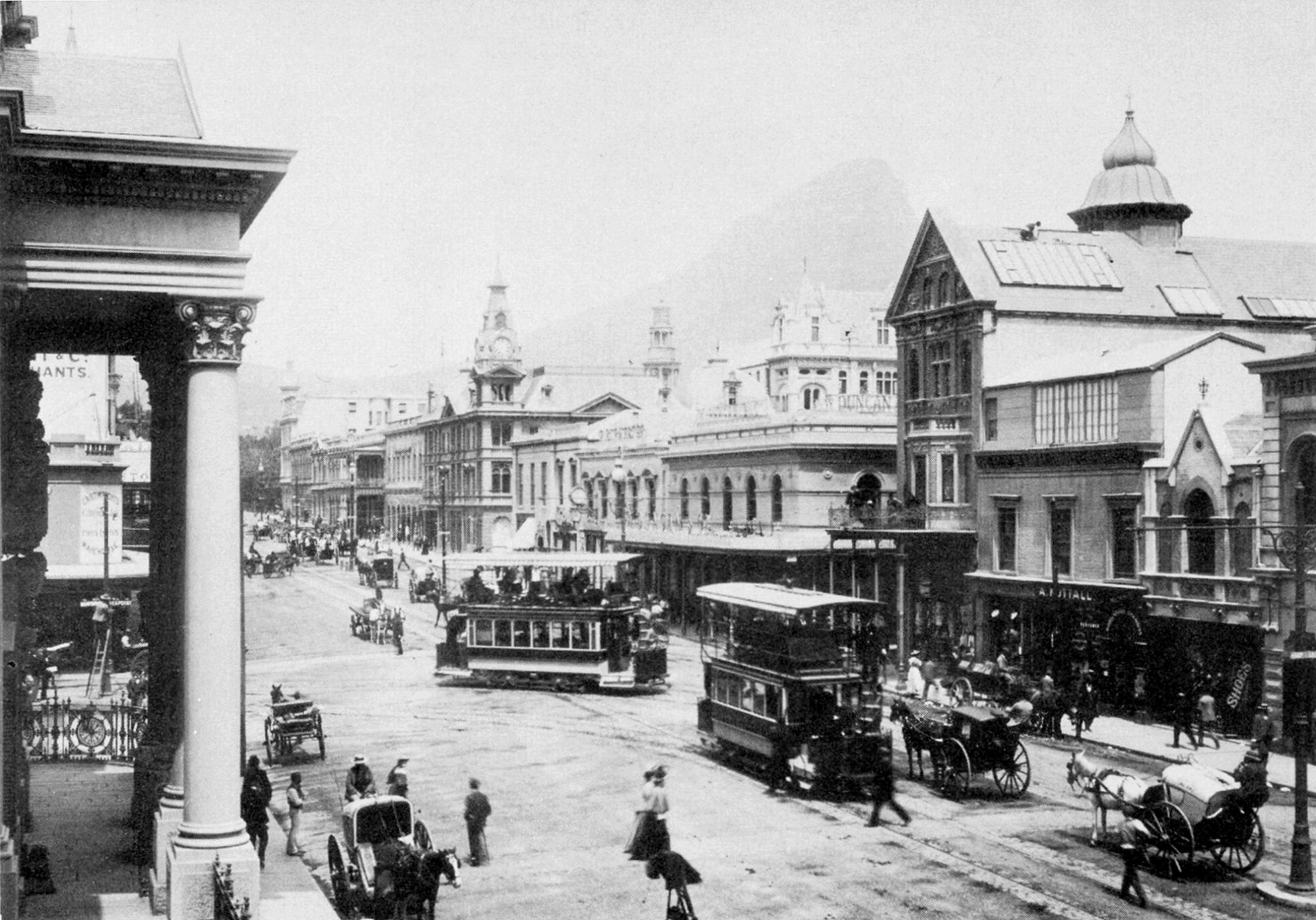
Adderley Street, c. 1900

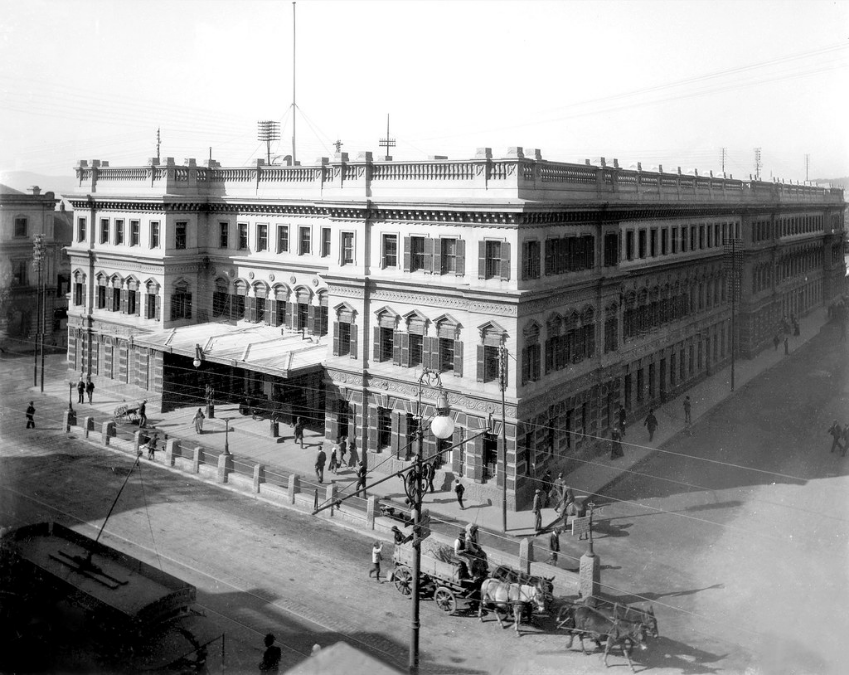
Cape Town railway station on Adderley Street, 1909

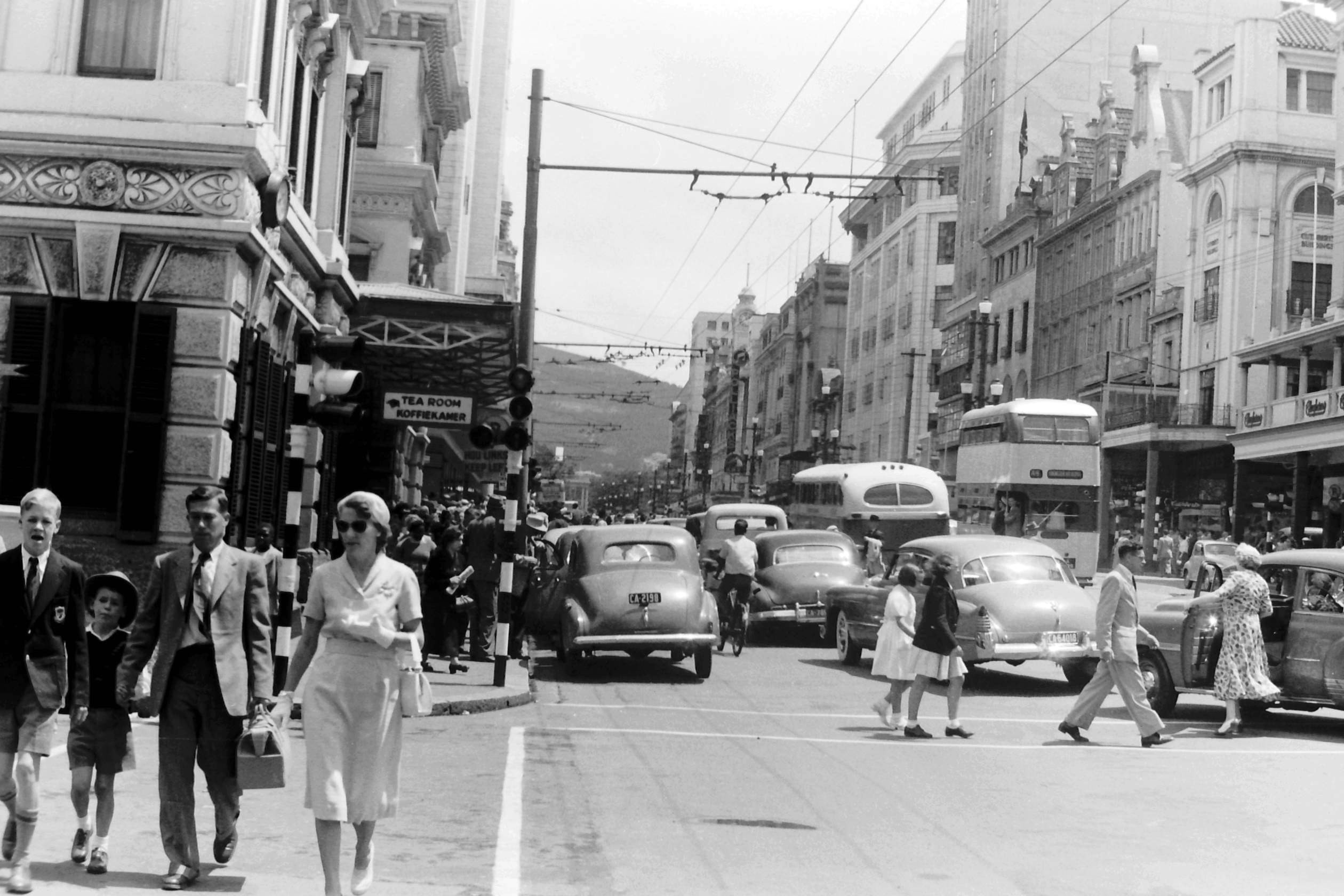
Adderley Street, Cape Town in the 1950s, looking south from Strand Street

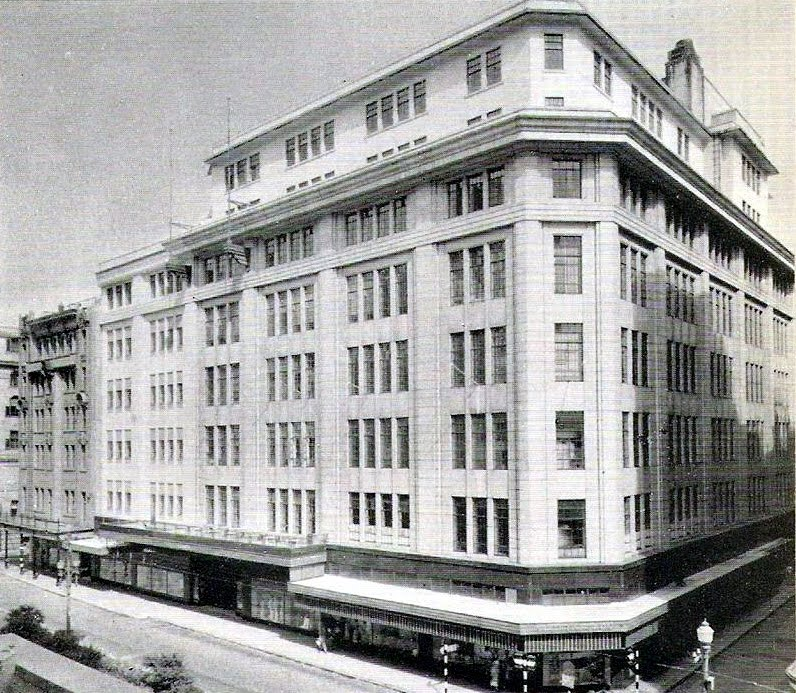
Stuttafords department store on Adderley Street, 1957

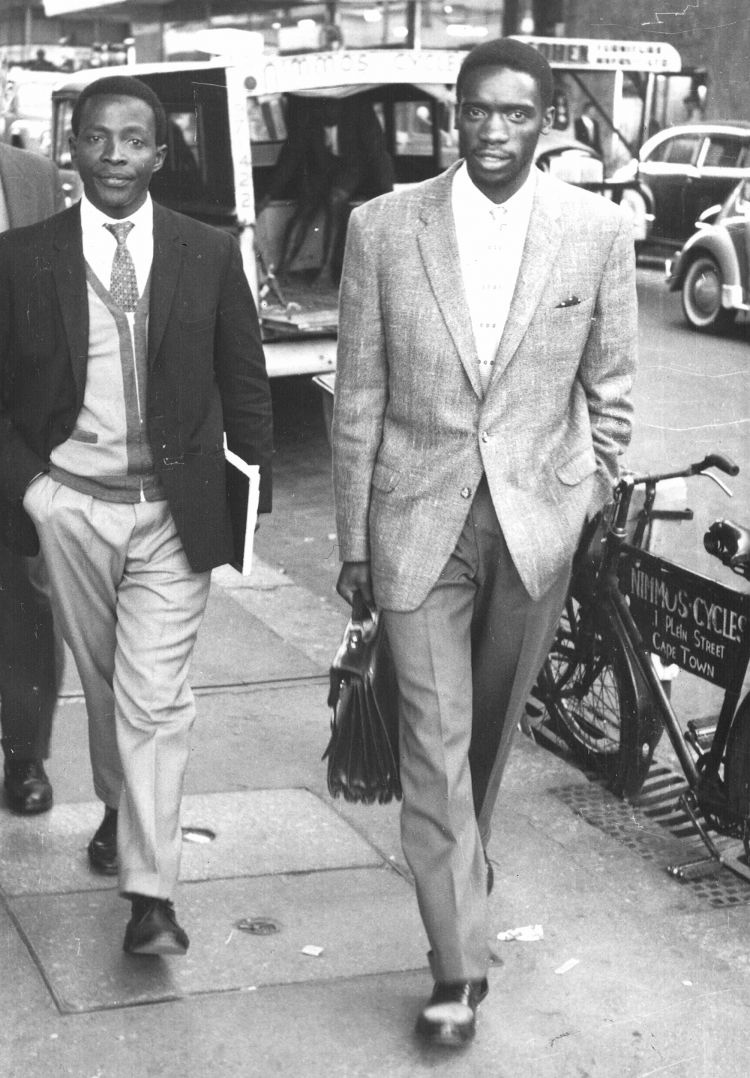
Archie Mafeje (right) with Welsh Makanda in August 1961

== See also ==
- Cape Town railway station
- Company's Garden
- Groote Kerk
- National heritage sites of South Africa
- Slave Lodge
