= Madibogo =

- Location within North West (South African province) Location within South Africa
- Coordinates: 26°25′S 25°11′E
- Country: South Africa
- Province: North West
- District: Ngaka Modiri Molema
- Municipality: Ratlou

Area
  - Total: 49.25 km^{2} (19.02 sq mi)

Population (2011)
  - Total: 22,556
  - Density: 458.0/km^{2} (1,186/sq mi)

Racial makeup (2011)
  - Black African: 98.8%
  - Coloured: 0.6%
  - Indian/Asian: 0.2%
  - White: 0.1%
  - Other: 0.3%

First languages (2011)
  - Tswana: 79.7%
  - Sotho: 9.4%
  - Xhosa: 3.9%
  - English: 2.0%
  - Other: 5.0%
- Time zone: UTC+2 (SAST)
- PO box: 2772

Madibogo is a village and rural area in Ratlou Local Municipality in the North West province of South Africa, it has Transnet station that is still operational for both Transnet Freight and Rovos. It is located 40 km out of Delareyville and about 19 km from Setlagole.
