= Garlicks =

Department store chain in South Africa

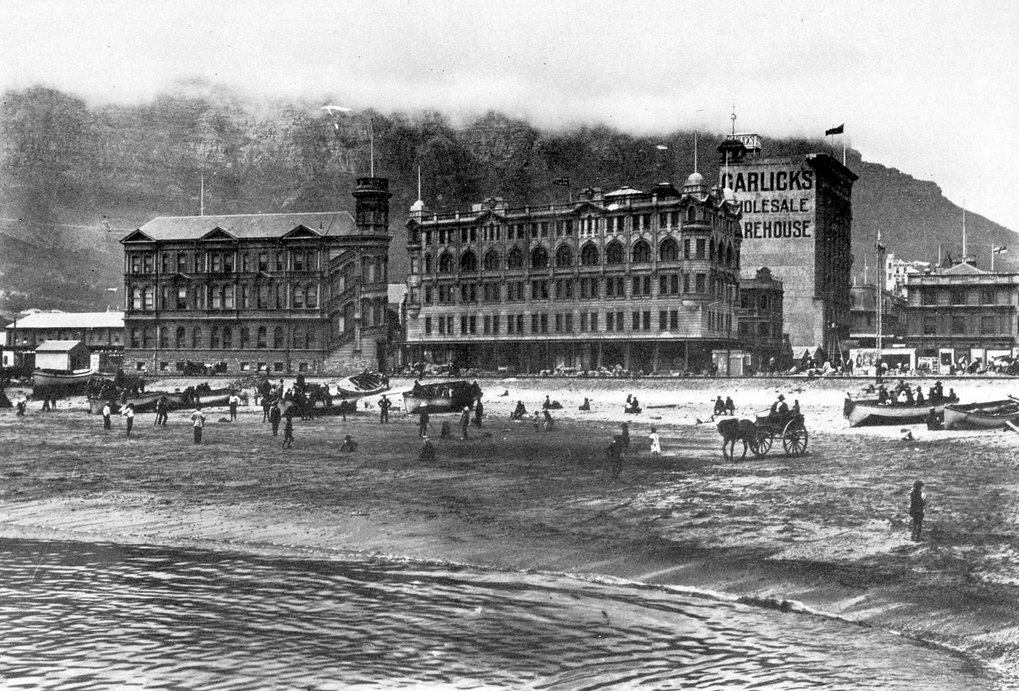
Garlick's warehouse, Roggebaai, Cape Town in 1905.

Garlicks was a department store chain in South Africa.

John Garlick started his first store on May 3, 1875, on the corner Bree and Strand Streets, in the central business district of Cape Town. In the 1880s, Garlick expanded with branches in the Transvaal, in Johannesburg and Pretoria, and in Kimberley in the northern Cape Province.

In 1892 the Cape Town store was replaced with a far grander store in Adderley Street at Exchange Place, across from Cape Town railway station. It had lifts (elevators), electric lights throughout, and automatic fire sprinklers. A few years later, Garlicks built South Africa's first steel-framed skyscraper, one of nine stories and the tallest building in Cape Colony at the time, and which had the first escalators in what is now South Africa. The company would come to have branches in Cavendish Square, Cape Town's first large suburban shopping centre, a branch in Johannesburg's Carlton Centre, Africa's tallest building, opened in the early 1970s as well as branches in other major cities of South Africa.

The last Garlicks department store closed in Cape Town in late February 1993.
