= Richard Stuttaford =

South African businessman and parliamentarian

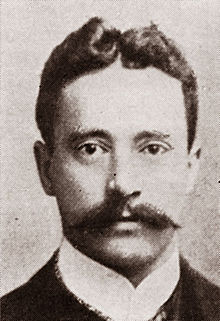

Minister of social welfare
- In office 1936–1939

Minister of trade and industry
- In office 1939–1942
- Prime Minister: Jan Smuts

Personal details
- Born: 13 June 1870 Cape Town, Cape Colony
- Died: 19 October 1945 (aged 75) Stellenbosch, Union of South Africa
- Citizenship: South African
- Party: South African Party
- Other political affiliations: United Party
- Parent: Samson Rickard Stuttaford (father)
- Occupation: Trader, parliamentarian

Richard Stuttaford (13 June 1870 – 19 October 1945) was a South African businessman and parliamentarian.

== Life and work ==
Stuttaford was the son of Samson Rickard Stuttaford, the founder of the Stuttafords department store chain. He was educated in Reading, England, and after school finished worked as a retail apprentice in Plymouth. He then studied at the Sorbonne University, France, and returned to South Africa in 1892 and joined the firm Thorne, Stuttaford & Co., which his father co-founded with Sir William Thorne. In 1898, when Stuttafords was listed on stock exchange, he became its managing director, and then chairman of the company in 1917.

Stuttaford was a member of the Cape Town City Council in 1905 and the Cape Town Chamber of Commerce, holding the position of the chairman of the latter from 1918 until 1920. He was the chairman of the Association of Chambers of Commerce of South Africa from 1921 until 1923.

== Political career ==
Stuttaford was not initially interested in public affairs, but at the age of 54, he was elected in 1924 to the Union Assembly as the representative for South African Party for Newlands, against the Constitutional Democrat, C.A. Lagesen. In 1929 he was elected unopposed from the same constituency and in 1933 he was again re-elected unopposed, but this time as South African Party coalition candidate from Claremont after Newlands was dissolved because of redemarcation. In 1938 he won as a candidate of the United Party in Claremont against E.M.O. Clough from the Dominion Party.

His knowledge of commerce was useful in the Union Assembly, and Jan Smuts invited him in 1932 to participate in negotiations with British commercial authorities in Ottawa. He served as a minister without portfolio from 1933 until 1936. Between 1936 and 1939 he was the minister of social welfare, and from 1939 until 1942, the minister of trade and industry in Smuts' war cabinet.

Stuttaford founded a garden village named Pinelands near Cape Town in 1920, which is now a suburb of Cape Town.

Stuttaford's Department Store, in Cape Town, was designed by the Scottish architect, Louis David Blanc (Harrod's in-house architect) in 1938.

== Marriage ==
Stuttaford married Ada Steele in 1903. They had two sons and two daughter, with eldest son, Richard Bawden Stuttaford, assuming chairmanship of Stuttafords from his father

== Death ==
Stuttaford died on his farm Stellenrust near Stellenbosch in 1945.
