= CNA =

CNA may refer to:

== Certifications ==
- Certification and accreditation, various countries
- Certified National Accountant, in Nigeria
- Certified Novell Administrator, in computing
- Certified Nursing Assistant, in various countries

== Education ==
- College of the North Atlantic, public college in Newfoundland
- Republic of China Naval Academy, in Taiwan

== Organizations ==
- California Nurses Association
- Canadian Nuclear Association
- Canadian Nurses Association
- Chin National Army
- CNA (nonprofit), the Center for Naval Analyses
- Center for Transportation and Logistics Neuer Adler
- Centre for Nonviolent Action, Bosnia and Serbia
- Royal Canadian Numismatic Association
- National Audiovisual Council, Romania
- Centre national de l'audiovisuel, Luxembourg
- CVE (Common Vulnerabilities and Exposures) Numbering Authority

=== Companies ===
- Canadian Numbering Administrator
- China Northern Airlines
- CNA Financial Corporation
- Compagnia Nazionale Aeronautica, an Italian aircraft manufacturer of the 1930s
- CNA (bookstore), a South African chain founded in 1896
- Cable Networks Akita, cable provider in Akita Prefecture, Japan

=== News agencies ===
- Caribbean News Agency
- Catholic News Agency, based in the United States
- Central News Agency (disambiguation), any of several news agencies
- CNA (TV network), a television network based in Singapore, abbreviated as Channel NewsAsia
- Cyprus News Agency

== People ==
- Go C-Na (born 1974), Japanese composer
- Chimamanda Ngozi Adichie (born 1977), Nigerian writer
- C. N. Annadurai (1909–1969), Indian politician

== Technology ==
- Computer network attack, one type of computer network operations (CNO) in U.S. military doctrine
- Converged network adapter, a computer interface for both general-purpose and storage networks
- CVE Numbering Authority, an entity responsible for assigning Common Vulnerabilities and Exposures identifiers

== Other uses ==
- Central Neo-Aramaic, a language
- Child Nutrition Act, United States
- Copy number abnormality, in genomics
- Cartoon Network Arabic, a TV channel
- The Campaign for North Africa, a board game
