= Ancient Gates of Ganja =

Gates of Ganja
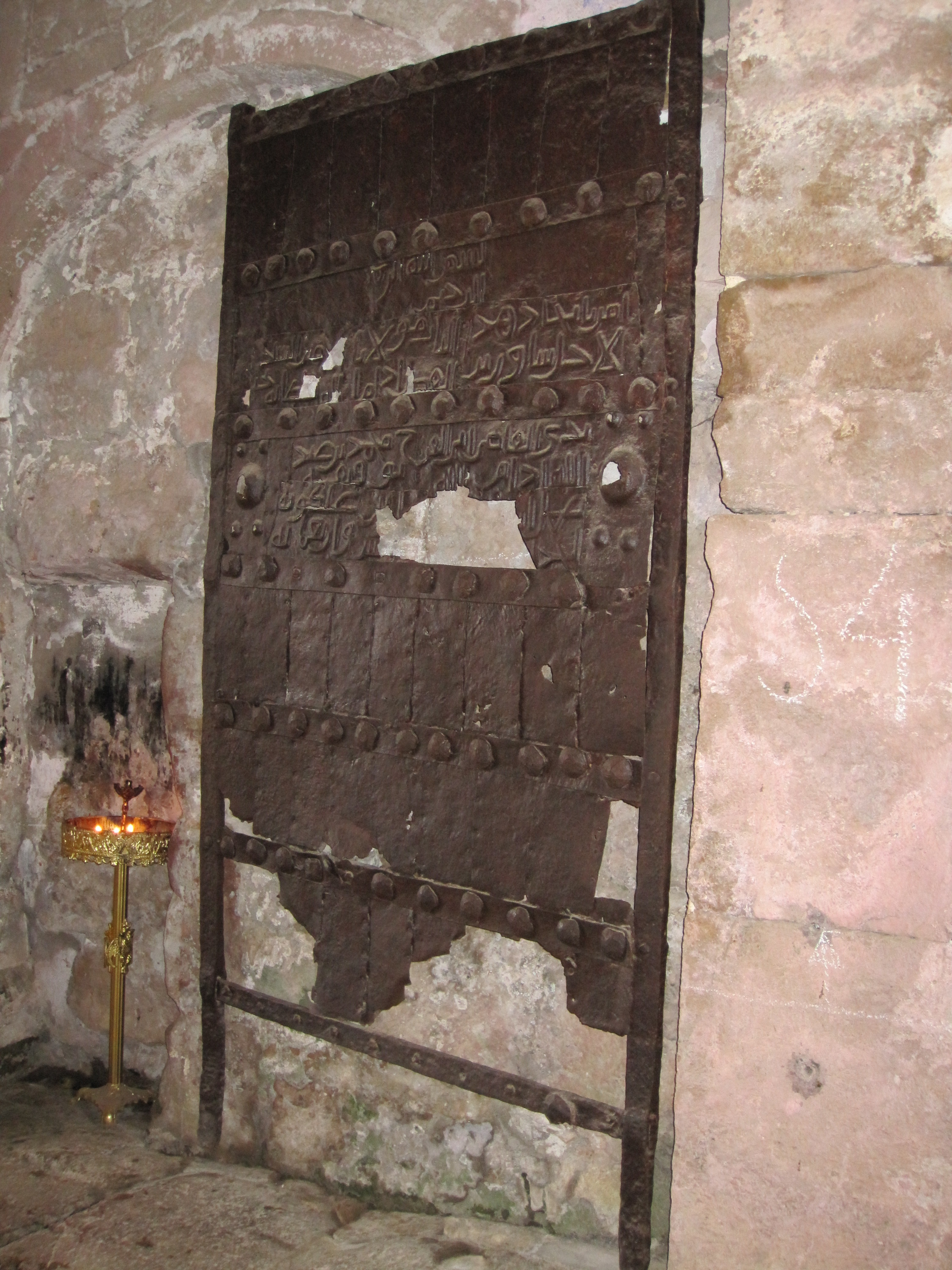
- Gates of Ganja at Gelati
- Interactive map of Gates of Ganja
- Location: Gelati Monastery, Georgia
- Completion date: 1063

The Ancient Gates of Ganja were a masterpiece of craftsmanship of the 10th to 11th centuries.

== History ==
In 1063, Shavur I, ruler of the Shaddadids dynasty, decided to build a castle surrounding Ganja. Six large gates were erected in different directions of the town. Upon Shavur's order master Ibrahim ibn Osman built the gates. The gates were of cast iron decorated on the outside with stamped ornaments and patterns made according to the chasing method.

The ornament contained the name of the master in the Kufi language and the date of the gate's completion. The inscriptions in Kufi Arabic on the surviving leaf of the gate read: "With the name of Allah, the merciful and benevolent. The Excellency Sayyid Shawur ibn Al-Fazl - May Allah keep his supremacy longer! - ordered this door to be built with the help of Abul Faraj Muhammad ibn Abdulla - Let Allah give success to him too. Smith Ibrahim ibn Osman Angaveyh's work. (1063)".

In 1139 a strong earthquake struck Ganja and practically destroyed the city. The earthquake was so strong that top part of Mount Kapaz to the south-west of the town broke off and fell down into the Aghsu River and created Lake Göygöl and other small lakes. King Demetrius I of Georgia took advantage of the earthquake to attack and loot the defenseless Ganja. He captured the gates as his trophy. The surviving citizens of Ganja carried the gates—weighing tons—on their backs.

Only one half of the gate has survived. It is built into the wall of Gelati Monastery across from the tomb of Georgian King David IV. Today, a leaf of this gate is fastened to the wall facing David I's grave in the yard of the monastery.

== Gallery ==
Gates of Ganja

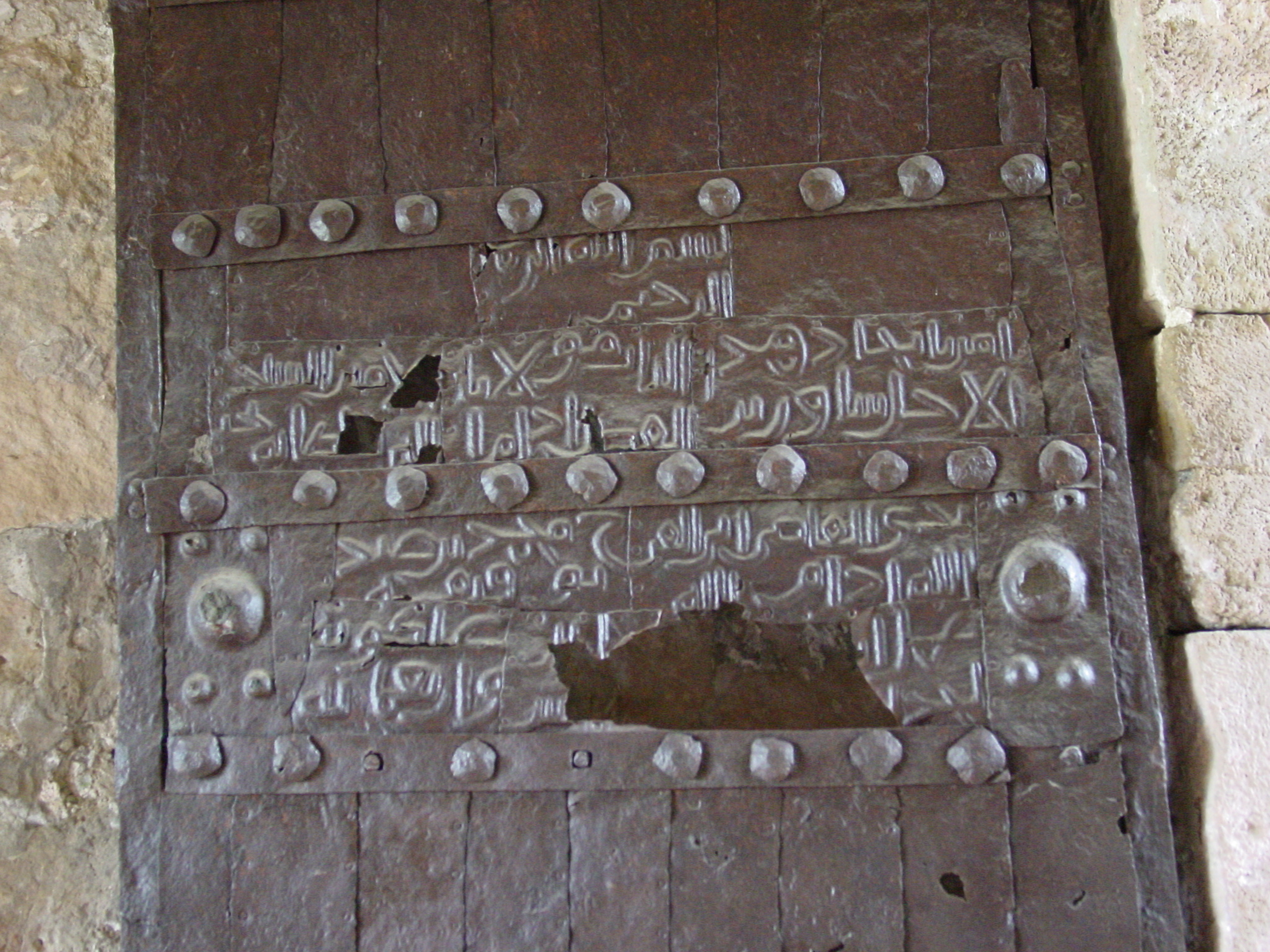

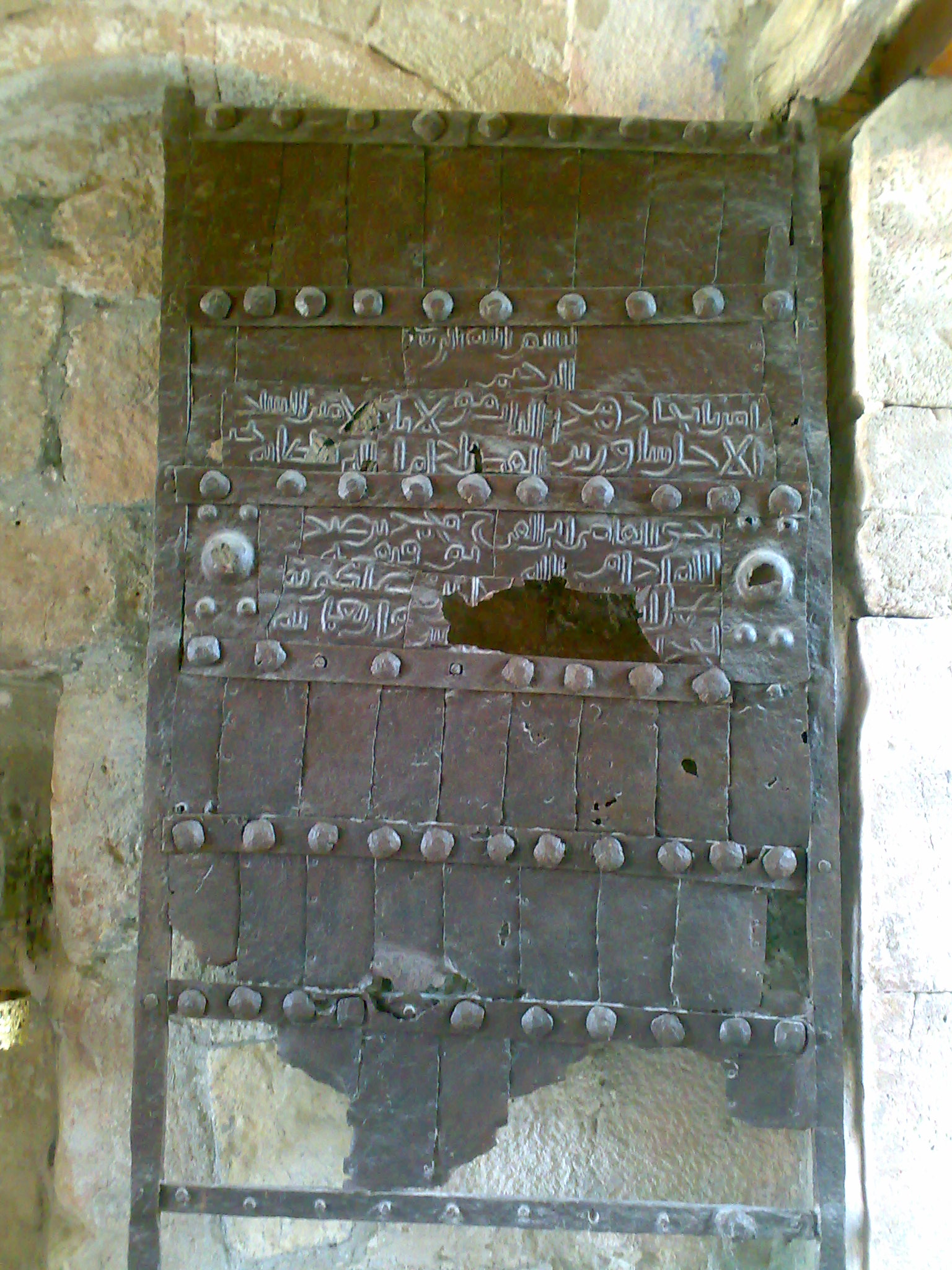

== See also ==
- Ganja, Azerbaijan
- Azerbaijani language
