= Krunoslav Sukić Award =

Croatia’s Annual Peace and Human Rights Award

- Awarded for: for promoting peacemaking, non-violence, and human rights in Croatia and Western Balkans
- Location: Osijek
- Country: Croatia
- Presented by: Centre for Peace, Nonviolonce and Human Rights - Osijek
- First award: 2009

The Krunoslav Sukić Award is a Croatian peace, nonviolence, and human rights award established by the Centre for Peace, Nonviolence and Human Rights – Osijek. It recognizes individuals, organizations, and institutions for contributions to human rights, freedoms, and a culture of peace in Croatia and the wider Western Balkans.

The Krunoslav Sukić Award comprises a main Award and three Accolade categories: Accolades for individuals and organizations, Book of the Year, and Peacebuilding School. The main Award, the highest distinction, consists of a commemorative plaque and a monetary prize, while the Accolades are generally symbolic distinctions presented in the form of commemorative plaques.

The Award plaque was designed by Professor Ivan Doroghy, PhD, a graphic design professor at the School of Design, Faculty of Architecture, University of Zagreb.

The Krunoslav Sukić Award is presented on Human Rights Day at the Croatian National Theatre in Osijek. The award ceremony has been attended by representatives of relevant institutions, including the Croatian Ombudswoman.

== Award Winners ==
Year	Honorees	Country	Note	Ref.
2009	Ladislav Bognar	Croatia		
2010	Jadranka Reihl-Kir	Croatia		
2011	Ljiljana Gehrecke	Croatia		
2011	Peter Kuzmič	Croatia		
2011	Veljko Vičević	Croatia		
2012	Ana and Otto Raffai	Croatia		
2012	Šerif Isaković	Bosnia and Herzegovina		
2013	Veselinka Kastratović	Croatia		
2013	Barbara Matejčić	Croatia		
2014	Bojan Glavašević	Croatia		
2014	Staša Zajović	Serbia		
2014	Clive Richard Fowel	United Kingdom		
2015	Marijan Gubina	Croatia		
2015	Prince Wale Soniyik	Nigeria		
2016	Zdravko Marijanović	Serbia		
2016	Ivana Paradžiković	Croatia		
2017	Lina Budak	Croatia		
2018	Amalija Krstanović	Croatia		
2019	Božena (Božica) Ciboci	Croatia		
2020	Dana Budisavljević	Croatia		
2020	Danka Derifaj	Croatia		
2020	Lejla Šehić Relić	Croatia		
2021	Mira Bilopavlović - Mirjana	Croatia		
2021	Lora Vidović	Croatia		
2022	Đordana Barbarić	Croatia		
2022	Mate Uzinić	Croatia		
2023	Branka Vierda	Croatia		
2023	Manda Prišing	Serbia		
2024	Romano Nikolić	Croatia		
2025	Emina Bužinkić	Croatia		
2025	Drago Hedl; Hrvoje Zovko, Ivan Ramljak; Nenad Puhovski	Croatia	The author and production team of the documentary film "Mirotvorac"	

== Recipients of the Accolade for Individuals and Organizations ==
Year	Honorees	Country	Note	Ref.
2010	Ana Matijević	Croatia		
2010	The Initiative "Ne damo Varšavsku"	Croatia		
2010	Independent student initiative for the right to free education	Croatia		
2011	Milena Perčin	Croatia		
2011	Elementary school "Milan Brozović" Kastav	Croatia		
2011	Association of fans of FC Zagreb "Bijeli anđeli"	Croatia		
2012	Marina Kolar	Croatia		
2012	Participants of the campaign "Victims waited too long"	Croatia	Daliborka Mikulić, Đorđe Gunjević, Krešimir Ivančić, Marica Kadić, Robert Kajušić, Vjera Solar and Zemina Jaroš	
2013	Duško Kostić	Croatia		
2013	Civic Initiative "Srđ Je Naš"	Croatia		
2014	Elementary school "Eugen Kumičić" from Rijeka	Croatia		
2014	Ana Kvesić	Croatia		
2015	Center for Peace Studies	Croatia		
2016	Network Youth united in peace	Bosnia and Herzegovina, Croatia, Serbia		
2017	Jadranka Brnčić, Ana Raffai and little sister Vesna Zovkić	Croatia		
2017	To the activists and volunteers of "No Name Kitchen Šid"	Serbia		
2018	Jelka Glumičić	Croatia		
2018	Association Roditelji u akciji - RODA	Croatia		
2018	Luka Oman	Croatia		
2019	The #spasime (#saveme) initiative	Croatia		
2019	Centre for Nonviolent Action	Bosnia and Herzegovina, Serbia		
2019	Snježana Prijić - Samaržija	Croatia		
2019	Marijana Mitrović	Croatia		
2020	Initiative "Jedni za druge"	Croatia		
2020	Ecumenical women's initiative - Omiš	Croatia		
2020	Mladen Kožić and Ivo Šegota	Croatia		
2020	Ajna Jusić	Bosnia and Herzegovina		
2021	Center for the culture of dialogue - campaign and program "My place under the Sun"	Croatia		
2021	Peace Institute from Ljubljana	Slovenia		
2021	Melanija Mešić	Croatia		
2022	The right of every child to a school meal	Croatia		
2022	Mirela Čavajda and Vanja Jurić	Slovenia		
2022	Semih Huseyin Adigüzel	Turkey		
2023	Croatian Mediation Association	Croatia		
2024	PAX for Peace, Peace Action, Integra and New Social Initiative, Civic Initiatives from Serbia and the International Center for Transitional Justice	Netherlands, North Macedonia, Kosovo, Serbia		
2024	Alma Džinić-Trutović	Bosnia and Herzegovina		
2024	Goran Matijević	Croatia		
2024	Spasenija Moro	Croatia		
2025	Youth Center "Kvart"	Bosnia and Herzegovina		
2025	Morana Miljanović	Croatia		

== Recipients of the Book of the Year Accolade ==
Year	Author	Title	Country	Ref.
2012	Vesna Janković and Nikola Mokrović (ed.)	"Antiratna kampanja 1991-2011 – Neispričana povijest"	Croatia	
2013	Ante Lešaja	"Knjigocid - uništavanje knjiga u Hrvatskoj ranih 90-tih"	Croatia	
2014	Dinko Telećan	"Dezerter"	Croatia	
2015	Boris Pavelić	"Smijeh slobode: uvod u Feral Tribune"	Croatia	
2016	Nikola Biliškov (ed.)	"Preživljavati usprkos"	Serbia	
2017	Ivica Đikić	"Beara"	Croatia	
2018	Zoran Grozdanov and Nebojša Zelić (ed.)	"Vjera u dijalog"	Croatia	
2019	Hrvoje Klasić	"White on Black"	Croatia	
2021	Ivana Bodrožić	"Sons, Daughters"	Croatia	
2022	Ivo Goldstein	"Antisemitism in Croatia from the middle ages to the present"	Croatia	
2023	Igor Beleš	"Listanje kupusa"	Croatia	
2024	Leonida Kovač	"Rasprizorenja"	Croatia	
2025	Branko Sekulić	"Prodor u srce sakraliziranog zločina"	Croatia	

== Peacebuilding School Accolade Recipients ==
Year	Honorees	Country	Note	Ref.
2015	Economic and Tourism School Daruvar	Croatia		
2016	Elementary school Ivan Goran Kovačić Vrbovsko	Croatia		
2017	Elementary School Hugo Badalić Slavonski Brod	Croatia		
2018	Secondary School in Delnice	Croatia		
2018	Secondary School of Economics in Vukovar	Croatia		
2018	Islamic Secondary School "Dr. Ahmed Smajlović" in Zagreb	Croatia		
2019	Commercial and Trade School in Bjelovar	Croatia		
2019	Elementary school "Antun and Stjepan Radić" in Gunja	Croatia		
2020	Elementary school "Ivana Brlić Mažuranić" in Ogulin	Croatia		
2020	Elementary School "Vladimir Nazor" in Potpićan	Croatia		
2021	I Gymnasium Zagreb	Croatia		
2021	High School Glina	Croatia		
2022	First Croatian High School in Rijeka	Croatia		
2022	High School "Bartolo Kašić" in Grubišno Polje	Croatia		
2023	Primary School "Gustav Krklec" in Zagreb	Croatia		
2023	Primary School "Petar Zrinski" in Čabar	Croatia		
2024	Elementary School "Ljudevit Gaj", Elementary School "Vladimir Becić" and Elementary School "Retfala"	Croatia	elementary schools in Osijek	
2025	Primary School "Višnjevac" and Primary School "Joakim Rakovac" in Sveti Lovreč Pazenatički	Croatia		
