= Topalhəsənli =

Topalhəsənli or Topalgasanli or Topalgasanly or Topalkhasanly may refer to:

- Topalhəsənli, Goygol, Azerbaijan
- Topalhəsənli, Kurdamir, Azerbaijan
