= Dozular =

- Municipality
- Location within Azerbaijan
- Coordinates: 40°31′51″N 46°28′17″E
- Country: Azerbaijan
- Rayon: Goygol

Population
  - Total: 518
- Time zone: UTC+4 (AZT)
  - Summer (DST): UTC+5 (AZT)

Dozular (also, Birges and Dosular) is a village and municipality in the Goygol Rayon of Azerbaijan on the unpaved track between Chayli and Chaykand. It has a population of 518. Dozular has an old bridge and houses made of distinctive purple, grey and cream stone
