= Yalqışlaq =

- Location within Azerbaijan
- Coordinates: 40°36′49″N 46°12′23″E
- Country: Azerbaijan
- Rayon: Goygol
- Municipality: Qızılca
- Time zone: UTC+4 (AZT)
  - Summer (DST): UTC+5 (AZT)

Yalqışlaq (also, Yalkyshlag and Yalkyshlak) is a village in the Goygol Rayon of Azerbaijan. The village forms part of the municipality of Qızılca.
