= Voroshilovka =

Voroshilovka may refer to the following places:

- Aşıqlı in Azerbaijan, also known as Voroshilovka
- Voroshilovka in the Smolensk Oblast of Russia
- Voroshylivka, Vinnytsia Oblast in Ukraine
