= Birgez =

- Location within Azerbaijan
- Coordinates: 40°31′52″N 46°28′38″E
- Country: Azerbaijan
- Rayon: Goygol
- Time zone: UTC+4 (AZT)

Birgez is a village in the Goygol Rayon of Azerbaijan.
