= Damcılı =

- Location within Azerbaijan
- Coordinates: 40°37′28″N 46°13′55″E
- Country: Azerbaijan
- Rayon: Goygol
- Municipality: Qızılca
- Time zone: UTC+4 (AZT)
  - Summer (DST): UTC+5 (AZT)

Damcılı (also, Damdzhaly, Damdzhyly, and Damzhaly) is a village in the Goygol Rayon of Azerbaijan. The village forms part of the municipality of Qızılca.
