= Ağyoxuş =

- Location within Azerbaijan
- Coordinates: 40°38′09″N 46°09′38″E
- Country: Azerbaijan
- Rayon: Goygol
- Time zone: UTC+4 (AZT)

Ağyoxuş (also, Agëkhush) is a village in the Goygol Rayon of Azerbaijan.
