= Səmədli =

Coordinates: 40°43′N 46°17′E

Samedli (Azerbaijani: Səmədli) is a village in the municipality of Gushgara in the Goygol District of Azerbaijan.
