= Kyurdalilyar =

- Location within Azerbaijan
- Coordinates: 40°23′19″N 46°15′04″E
- Country: Azerbaijan
- Rayon: Goygol
- Time zone: UTC+4 (AZT)
  - Summer (DST): UTC+5 (AZT)

Kyurdalilyar (also, Kyurd-Alilar and Kyurdalylar) is a village in the Goygol Rayon of Azerbaijan.
