= Aşağı Zurnabad =

Village in Goygol, Azerbaijan

Coordinates: 40°32′N 46°15′E

Aşağı Zurnabad is a village in the municipality of Zurnabad in the Goygol Rayon of Azerbaijan.
