= Köşkü =

- Location within Azerbaijan
- Coordinates: 40°32′15″N 46°18′55″E
- Country: Azerbaijan
- Rayon: Goygol
- Municipality: Aşıqlı
- Time zone: UTC+4 (AZT)
  - Summer (DST): UTC+5 (AZT)

Köşkü (also, Keşkü, Keshkyu, Keshki, and Keshkyul’) is a village in the Goygol Rayon of Azerbaijan. The village forms part of the municipality of Aşıqlı.
