= Zurqes =

- Location within Azerbaijan
- Coordinates: 40°32′N 46°15′E
- Country: Azerbaijan
- Rayon: Goygol
- Time zone: UTC+4 (AZT)
  - Summer (DST): UTC+5 (AZT)

Zurqes (also, Aşağı Çiçəkli and Zurges) is a village in the Goygol Rayon of Azerbaijan.
