= Elshad Mirbashir oghlu =

Azerbaijani politician

- Elşad Mirbəşir oğlu
- Born: July 27, 1977 (age 49); Topalhasanli, Goygol, Azerbaijan
- Education: Baku State University
- Occupation: political scientist

Elshad Mirbashir oghlu (Azerbaijani: Elşad Mirbəşir oğlu, born July 27, 1977, Topalhasanli, Goygol) – is a member of National Assembly (Milli Majlis) of Azerbaijan, board member of the ruling New Azerbaijan Party, board member and vice chairman of Social Research Center, member of The Anti-Corruption Commission of the Republic of Azerbaijan, political scientist, politician, Professor of the Department of Political Science and Political Management of the Academy of Public Administration under the President of the Republic of Azerbaijan since 2007.

== Life ==
Elshad Mirbashir oghlu was born on July 27, 1977, in Topalhasanli village, Goygol (Khanlar) district in a teacher family. In 1984 he entered the first class of secondary school No. 3 named Samad Vurgun in Goygol and graduated from the same school in 1994.

== Education, degree and scientific names ==
In 1994–1998, Elshad Mirbashir oghlu graduated from the Baku State University, Faculty of Social Sciences and Psychology with honors. In 1998–2000, he graduated his master's degree in political science from the Faculty of Social Sciences and Psychology with honors.

From 2002 to 2005, he was a PhD candidate in the Department of Political Science and Sociology. On June 10, 2005, he defended his thesis at the Academy of Public Administration on "Participation of third parties in the resolution of political conflicts". In 2008, he entered the doctoral program of the Department of Political Science and Political Management of the Academy of Public Administration.

In 2011, he conducted research and lectured at the Vienna Diplomatic Academy (Austria). In 2018, he successfully defended his doctoral thesis on "Theoretical Aspects and Technologies of Contemporary Political Conflict" and received a Doctor of Political Science degree.

== Career ==
From 2002 to 2013 Elshad Mirbashir oghlu worked as a lecturer in the Department of Political Science and Sociology at Baku State University. Since September 2007 he has been working as an associate professor at the Department of Political Science and Political Management at the Academy of Public Administration.

In 2016–2019, he served as the head of the analytical department of the President of the Republic of Azerbaijan at the Institute of Law and Human Rights of the ANAS and the Department of International Relations and Human Rights. He was the chairman of the New Azerbaijan Party organization at the Institute of Law and Human Rights of ANAS.

By the decree of President Ilham Aliyev dated November 29, 2019, he was appointed a member of the Management Board of the Social Research Center and later was elected as the vice chairman of the center.

He has been elected a member of the Azerbaijani Parliament on February 9, 2020.

He is a member of The Commission on Combating Corruption of the Republic of Azerbaijan.

He has been elected board member of the ruling New Azerbaijan Party.

He is the commentator of the State Television of Azerbaijan and the leader of the political analytical program "The World Today". In addition, Elshad Mirbashir oghlu is an editor of the political department of the New Azerbaijan newspaper, head of the analytical group "Yeni Azerbaijan" and a member of the New Azerbaijan Party.

He is the author of three scientific monographs, more than 50 scientific articles, and several educational programs. He is fluent in German, Russian and Turkish.

== Family ==
Elshad Mirbashir oghlu is married and has two children.

== Works ==
=== Research Area ===
- Political Conflict: Essence, Structure and Mechanisms for Solution
- Modern military-political conflict

=== Selected works ===
- Heydar Aliyev's strategy will restore Azerbaijan's territorial integrity
- Heydar Aliyev is the founder of new political management in the Republic of Azerbaijan
- Requirements arising from Azerbaijan's dialectics of existence and development
- Contemporary Perspectives on Ethnic Conflict
- The military factor in the resolution of political conflicts
- Meditation services in the resolution of political conflicts
- Formation and development of modern international conflicts
- Negotiations as a means of settlings political conflicts
- Peaceful and violent means of resolving political conflicts
- Modern international relations and terrorism
- The Great Silk Road: In the context of the strategic interests of the Republic of Azerbaijan.

==== Books ====
Political conflicts: essence, structure, solution

== Awards ==
In 2019, he was awarded the Jubilee Medal "100th Anniversary of the Azerbaijan Democratic Republic (1918-2018)" by the Order of President Ilham Aliyev.
