= Peyədərə =

- Location within Azerbaijan
- Coordinates: 40°38′35″N 46°08′56″E
- Country: Azerbaijan
- Rayon: Goygol
- Time zone: UTC+4 (AZT)
  - Summer (DST): UTC+5 (AZT)

Peyədərə (also, Paya Dara, Peyadere, and Peyaderesi) is a village in the Goygol Rayon of Azerbaijan.
