= Minister of Police v Rabie =

South African legal case

Minister of Police v Rabie is an important case in the South African law of delict. It was heard in the Appellate Division on September 3, 1984, with judgment handed down on September 27, 1985. The presiding officers were Jansen JA, Joubert JA, Cillié JA, Van Heerden JA and Vivier AJA. The appellant was represented by the State Attorney, Johannesburg. The respondent's attorneys were Mather & Sim, Johannesburg, and McIntyre & Van der Post, Bloemfontein.

The central issue was the extent of the liability of the Minister of Police for wrongful acts committed by a policeman. In an appeal by the Minister of Police against an award of damages by the court a quo, it was contended that the sergeant's conduct had been unrelated to his police work. The Appellate Division dismissed the appeal, referring to the proposition that a master (in this instance, the State) who does his work by the hand of a servant (in this instance, the sergeant) creates a risk of harm to others if the servant should prove to be negligent or inefficient or untrustworthy. The sergeant's conduct, on the facts, had fallen within the purview of the risk created by State in employing him, and it was evident to the court that the sergeant's employment was conducive to the wrongs he committed. The State, therefore, was found to be vicariously liable for those wrongs.

The case is cited most often for the following passage:

It seems clear that an act done by a servant solely for his own interests and purposes, although occasioned by his employment, may fall outside the course or scope of his employment, and that in deciding whether an act by the servant does so fall, some reference is to be made to the servant's intention. The test is in this regard subjective. On the other hand, if there is nevertheless a sufficiently close link between the servant's acts for his own interests and purposes and the business of his master, the master may yet be liable. This is an objective test.

This test, although frequently applied, "has not always been followed." In K v Minister of Safety and Security, for example, the Supreme Court of Appeal formulated the test somewhat differently, saying that the question to be asked is whether the deviation is of such a degree that it can still be said the employee is exercising the functions to which he was appointed or carrying out some instruction of the employer. When K v Minister of Safety and Security went before the Constitutional Court, O'Regan complained that "variations of the [Rabie] test have proliferated, and have resulted in uncertainty," and sought to remove this uncertainty by applying the test and holding its objective element, approached with the spirit, purport and objects of the Constitution in mind, to be sufficiently flexible to incorporate constitutional as well as other norms. It required the court applying it to articulate its reasoning for its conclusions as to whether there was a sufficient connection between the wrongful conduct and the employment. Thus developed, O'Regan J held, the application of the test was not at odds with the constitutional order.

== Facts ==
About thirty minutes into New Year's Day 1981, André Rabie, the respondent in this matter, was stopped by one Albertus Arnoldus Van der Westhuizen, a sergeant employed in the South African Police Force as a mechanic to repair police vehicles, who accused him of attempting to break into a CNA store. The sergeant was at the relevant time off duty, in plain clothes, on the scene in his private vehicle and in pursuance of his own interests. Although he identified himself to Rabie, and purported and intended to act, as a policeman, he was in fact actuated only by malice. Van der Westhuizen proceeded to assault, arrest and detain Rabie in prison. Rabie was duly prosecuted but ultimately acquitted. Van der Westhuizen's actions were found by the court to be totally self-serving and mala fide.

Rabie instituted and later succeeded in an action for damages based on section 1 of the State Liability Act. In the Witwatersrand Local Division, Goldstone J held the Minister of Police and Van der Westhuizen to be jointly and severally liable. The former appealed.

== Arguments ==
=== Appellant ===
In the Appellate Division, JJ Wessels argued that Van der Westhuizen had acted maliciously in assaulting, arresting and charging Rabie, without having any reason to do so. This he had done out of spite or ill-will, brought on by factors unknown, but it was speculated that it could have been related to his experience earlier on in the evening, when he had been ejected from the home of his ex-parents-in-law, who lived in the area and had been hosting a New Year's Eve gathering. There could be no suggestion, Wessels continued, that Van der Westhuizen had reasonably suspected that the respondent was attempting to break into the CNA. The conclusion must be that Van der Westhuizen was acting without any reasonable cause and out of pure malice at the time of the arrest and assault.

The court a quo, Wessels noted, had found Van der Westhuizen to have been acting within the course and scope of his employment when he arrested and assaulted the respondent, and that Van der Westhuizen had "also acted as servant of the State in detaining the plaintiff." Goldstone J had erred, however, in Wessels's view, by overlooking the fact that Van der Westhuizen had not acted in pursuance or in the execution of any duties imposed upon him by the Police Act or his employer, but that he had arrested and assaulted the respondent without any reasonable cause, and had therefore acted maliciously. The judge a quo had also erred, according to Wessels, in his finding that the appellant was liable merely because Van der Westhuizen also acted "as a servant of the State." The court was at this point referred to the case of Minister of Police v Mbilini.

The sole point for decision, contended Wessels, was whether or not the appellant could be held vicariously liable for the conduct of Van der Westhuizen. The position of policemen committing delicts had been considered in a number of previous cases, including Mhlongo and Another v Minister of Police, Minister van Polisie en 'n Ander v Gamble en 'n Ander and Magubane v Minister van Polisie. The functions of the South African Police were set out in section 5 of the Police Act; their powers and duties were enumerated in section 6.

It fell now to be decided what were the duties of a private employee in relation to his employer and the employee's delict and duties of employment or instruction. Van der Westhuizen was not acting in terms of the Police Act at the time of the incident, and he was not under the supervision of officers of the Police Force, but was busy, Wessels argued, with an act unrelated to his employment with the Department of Police; he was engaged upon a private and personal enterprise. Wessels said that this was borne out when the test enunciated in the case of Ongevallekommissaris v Onderlinge Versekerings-Genootskap (AVBOB) was applied: namely, that of "dominante indruk."

Wessels thought it clear that Van der Westhuizen had acted maliciously, in that he had arrested and assaulted respondent without any reason. Under these circumstances, his conduct would be comparable with the policeman's actions in the case of Germishuys. Van der Westhuizen's conduct had nothing to do with police work; it was a private action. If, for instance, Van der Westhuizen had personally broken into the CNA and stolen goods, the CNA would not have been able to hold the appellant liable for the damages. Why then, Wessels demanded, should the appellant be held liable for the assault and arrest?

The next question to be decided was what the appellant's position was in regard to the detention of respondent. Section 50 of the Criminal Procedure Act regulates the procedure after arrest. As soon as an accused is brought to the police station, and a charge laid against him, a new decision has to be taken by the police: whether he should be detained or not. Even if the arrest and detention up to that stage were unlawful, Wessels continued, the detention after the decision to prosecute can be lawful, if the decision to prosecute was lawful: that is to say, taken bona fide on reasonable grounds. Only when the police act mala fide, without reasonable and probable cause, can an action for unlawful detention against the appellant succeed for the time that the respondent was held in custody in the police cells. In this case, Wessels concluded, the action of the police was justified as there was a statement in the docket by Van der Westhuizen which reasonably showed an attempt by respondent to break into the CNA, whilst the respondent had made a statement saying that he did not wish to say anything at that stage but that he would make his statement in court.

In so far as the claim for malicious prosecution was concerned, Wessels cited for the elements of malicious prosecution the fifteenth volume of Joubert's The Law of South Africa and McKerron's The Law of Delict In so far as the position of the appellant was concerned in regard to the malicious prosecution, the respondent could not succeed against the appellant unless he proved that Van der Westhuizen had acted within the course and scope of his employment when he made the statement at the police station. What had already been submitted in regard to vicarious liability, Wessels argued, was therefore also applicable in this regard. He noted also that it was not only policemen who were concerned with the prevention of crime and the maintenance of law and order, but also private individuals. Criminal Procedure Act 51 of 1977 authorises private persons to arrest people without a warrant and compels private persons between the ages of sixteen and sixty to assist policemen with the arrest of a person or the detention of a person if requested by a policeman. Wessels described the statement made by Van der Westhuizen as having also been made maliciously, out of caprice, and as unrelated to any duties of a policeman in terms of the Police Act.

=== Respondent ===
TW Beckerling, for the respondent, said that the only issue to be decided was whether or not the appellant was vicariously responsible and liable for the damages sustained by the respondent in consequence of Van der Westhuizen's conduct. The basis for the respondent's claim against the appellant arose from the provisions of section 1 of the State Liabilities Act. It was common cause that Van der Westhuizen had committed a wrong by unlawfully arresting the respondent and causing the latter's detention and prosecution. It was likewise common cause between the parties that, at all relevant times, Van der Westhuizen was a servant of the State, in that he was employed in the South African Police Force as a policeman in the mechanical section of the South African Police at Boksburg. The issue to be decided was confined to whether Van der Westhuizen, when he committed the unlawful acts, acted in his capacity or within the scope of his authority as a servant of the State.

Although section 1 of the State Liabilities Act spoke only of a State servant acting "within the scope of his authority", the courts, Beckerling contended, had treated this as embracing the concept "within the scope of his employment". A "member of the Force" was defined in section 1 of the Police Act. Sergeant Van der Westhuizen clearly was a member of the Force in terms of the pleadings and the statement of admitted facts. He was also a "peace officer" as defined in section 1 of the Criminal Procedure Act (CPA). His powers of arrest were set out, inter alia, in section 40(1) of the CPA. It was common cause that Van der Westhuizen, being a member of the Force in terms of the Police Act, purported to arrest the respondent in terms of section 40(1) when, thinking that the respondent had attempted to commit the crime of housebreaking, he grabbed hold of the respondent, confronted him with his suspicion, struck him with a wheel spanner across the forehead, identified himself as a policeman by stating that he was a policeman and that he was arresting the respondent, and thereafter took the respondent to the police station.

Beckerling argued that Van der Westhuizen, thinking that the respondent had attempted to commit the crime of housebreaking, was dutybound to arrest him. Even, however, if it were held that Van der Westhuizen, perceiving the situation as he did, was under no duty to arrest the respondent, he nevertheless exercised his discretion in deciding to arrest the respondent. All the members of the South African Police Force, Beckerling continued, are prima facie servants of the State; consequently, when a wrongful act is committed by a member of the Force in the course or scope of his employment, the State is prima facie liable. It is then for the State to show that, in committing the wrongful act, the policeman was engaged upon a duty or function of such a nature as to take him out of the category of servant pro hac vice.

There was no evidence to the effect that a person employed as was Sergeant Van der Westhuizen had police duties any different from those of any other member of the Force. It would, furthermore, be for the appellant, said Beckerling, to show that the nature of the duties of Sergeant Van der Westhuizen were such that, when he arrested the respondent, he was not acting as a servant of the State. In order for the duty or function to take a policeman out of the category of servant, it must be one which is personal to him, in the sense that from its very nature the State is so deprived of the power to direct or control him in the carrying out of his duty or function that he cannot be regarded pro hac vice as the servant of the State. The mere fact that the duty or function is a statutory one, or that it confers upon the policeman a discretion, was not to Beckerling's mind decisive. Many aspects of a policeman's employment are governed by statute. In many of his functions, he must, of necessity, be called upon to exercise some measure of discretion. The essential criterion is whether his employer, the State, has the power to direct or control him in the execution of his duty or function, including the exercise of the discretion, if any.

Complete control in every respect, argued Beckerling, is not essential to the master-and servant relationship. Some degree of freedom from control is not incompatible with the relationship. In Mhlongo's case, it had been unnecessary for the court to decide whether there was State liability for an unlawful arrest effected by a policeman exercising his own discretion to arrest without a warrant while he was about police business. The court in Mhlongo, however, had voiced the following obiter opinion:

Turning more specifically to an arrest made by a policeman without warrant and upon his own initiative in his role of "peace officer," it seems to me that a distinction can, and should, be drawn between his decision to make the arrest and the means employed by him to effect the arrest.

Furthermore:

In the circumstances, there is much to be said for the view that the decision of the policeman to arrest without warrant is a function over which his employer, the State, has no power of direction or control.

It is contrary to principle and policy, Beckerling urged, that a policeman should have the chameleon-like ability to be a servant of the State at one moment and not at another, when at both times he is carrying out the functions of a policeman. The decision to arrest might take only seconds, and it seemed to Beckerling that, for that brief period, a police officer arresting without a warrant might, according to Mhlongo's case, pro hac vice be taken out of the category of a State servant. The court in Mhlongo had held that the essential question is not whether the duty performed by the policeman is statutory, or whether the policeman exercises a discretion, but rather whether the State has the power to direct or control him in the execution of his duty or function. The important question, in regard to the control test for determining the master-servant relationship, is not the existence of control but rather the right of control or, to use the Court's words, power to control.

That being so, continued Beckerling, the State, through the Commissioner of Police and superior officers, has the power or right to control the decision of policemen to arrest or not to arrest in a particular instance. Unlawful arrests, he noted, constitute a serious encroachment on individual liberty. The liability of the Minister of Police had now been broadened to the extent that it included liability for every stage of an unlawful arrest committed by a policeman in the scope of his employment. The principles, based on the peculiar status of the police force in England, ought now, in Beckerling's opinion, to have been fading into obscurity. In the light of the dictum in the Areff case, he argued, the broadening of the basis for State liability was understandable and proper. The vicarious liability of a master, in the ultimate analysis, is based upon considerations of social policy.

In conclusion, Sergeant Van der Westhuizen, when he arrested the respondent, was a member of the Force as defined in the Police Act. Being a peace officer, he was entitled in terms of section 40 (1) of the Criminal Procedure Act to arrest the respondent without a warrant. He purported to arrest the respondent. He was prima facie a servant of the appellant and consequently, when he wrongfully purported to arrest the respondent, the appellant became prima facie liable. It was then for the appellant to show that, in committing the wrongful act, Van der Westhuizen was engaged upon a duty or function of such a nature as to take him out of the category of servant pro hac vice. In order for the duty or function to take Van der Westhuizen out of the category of servant, it had to be one which was personal to Van der Westhuizen, in the sense that, from its very nature, the appellant was so deprived of the power to direct and control him in the carrying out of his duty or function that Van der Westhuizen could not be regarded pro hac vice as a servant of the appellant.

Van der Westhuizen had, at all material times, when he was about police business, been under the command, supervision and control of his seniors, and thus under the control of the appellant. It therefore could be said that pro hac vice Van der Westhuizen was not an employee or servant of the appellant when he exercised his statutory discretion within the scope of his employment. In the premises, said Beckerling in closing, the appellant was vicariously liable for the damages caused by the unlawful acts of Van der Westhuizen.

== Judgment ==
After Wessels's reply, the case adjourned, and a year later a majority of the Appellate Division returned with its decision. It held that the apposite approach to the present case, where Van der Westhuizen (whatever his ostensible conduct) was not in reality performing any of the functions set out in section 5 of the Police Act, would proceed from the basis for vicarious liability set out in the case of Feldman (Pty) Ltd v Mall:

A master who does his work by the hand of a servant creates a risk of harm to others if the servant should prove to be negligent or inefficient or untrustworthy [....] Because he has created this risk for his own ends he is under a duty to ensure that no one is injured by the servant's improper conduct or negligence in carrying on his work.

The court held further that, on this approach, the emphasis shifted from the precise nature of Van der Westhuizen's intention and the link between his acts and police work, to the dominant question of whether or not his acts fell within the risks created by the State. The court found that his acts did indeed fall within the purview of the risks created by the State in appointing him as a member of the Force, it being evident that his appointment was conducive to the wrong he committed.

The court decided, accordingly, per Jansen JA (Joubert JA, Cillié JA and I Vivier AJA concurring, and Van Heerden JA dissenting) that the appeal had to be dismissed. The decision of the Witwatersrand Local Division, in Rabie v Minister of Police and Another was thus confirmed, albeit for different reasons.
