= Cümşüdlü =

- Municipality
- Location within Azerbaijan
- Coordinates: 40°40′59″N 46°16′34″E
- Country: Azerbaijan
- Rayon: Goygol

Population
  - Total: 1,590
- Time zone: UTC+4 (AZT)
  - Summer (DST): UTC+5 (AZT)

Cümşüdlü (also, Dzhumshudin and Dzhyumshyudlyu) is a village and municipality in the Goygol Rayon of Azerbaijan. It has a population of 1,590.
