= Tülallar =

- Municipality
- Location within Azerbaijan
- Coordinates: 40°26′16″N 46°14′29″E
- Country: Azerbaijan
- Rayon: Goygol

Population
  - Total: 207
- Time zone: UTC+4 (AZT)
  - Summer (DST): UTC+5 (AZT)

Tülallar (also, Tulalar, Tülalar, and Tulallar) is a village and municipality in the Goygol Rayon of Azerbaijan. It has a population of 207.
