= Ganya =

Ganya may refer to:

- Francis Chachu Ganya, Kenyan politician
- Ganya, a diminutive of the Russian male first name Agap
- Ganya, a diminutive of the Russian female first name Agapiya

== See also ==
- Ganja (disambiguation)
