= Central News =

Central News may refer to:

- ITV News Central, a regional television news and current affairs programme for the English Midlands, previously known as Central News
- Central News, a number of agencies
