= Bəhrambağ =

Village in Goygol, Azerbaijan

Coordinates: 40°39′N 46°17′E

Bəhrambağ is a village in the municipality of Quşqara in the Goygol Rayon of Azerbaijan.
