= Qızılca, Goygol =

Qızılca
- Municipality
- Location within Azerbaijan
- Coordinates: 40°37′13″N 46°12′59″E
- Country: Azerbaijan
- District: Goygol

Population
  - Total: 2,703
- Time zone: UTC+4 (AZT)
  - Summer (DST): UTC+5 (AZT)

Qızılca (Gizilja) is a village and municipality in the Goygol District of Azerbaijan. It has a population of 2,703. The municipality consists of the villages of Qızılca, Damcılı, Danayeri, Yalqışlaq, and Yeni Qızılca.
