= Derebeyli =

- Location within Azerbaijan
- Coordinates: 40°35′41″N 46°16′02″E
- Country: Azerbaijan
- Rayon: Goygol
- Time zone: UTC+4 (AZT)
  - Summer (DST): UTC+5 (AZT)

Derebeyli (also known as Derebegly) is a village in the Goygol Rayon of Azerbaijan.
