= Danayeri =

- Location within Azerbaijan
- Coordinates: 40°37′15″N 46°10′43″E
- Country: Azerbaijan
- Rayon: Goygol
- Municipality: Qızılca
- Time zone: UTC+4 (AZT)
  - Summer (DST): UTC+5 (AZT)

Danayeri (also, Danayer and Malyr Danair) is a village in the Goygol Rayon of Azerbaijan. The village forms part of the municipality of Qızılca.
