= Ganja (disambiguation) =

Ganja often refers to cannabis.

Ganja may also refer to:

== People ==
- Ganja Karuppu, Indian actor
- Laganja Estranja, American drag queen
- Alexander Ganja (Oleksandr Hanzha), one of the Dnepropetrovsk maniacs

== Places ==
=== Azerbaijan ===
- Ganja, Azerbaijan, a city in Azerbaijan
- Gəncə, Goygol, a village in Azerbaijan

=== Iran ===
- Ganzak, an ancient city in Iran
- Ganja (Lorestan Province, Iran)
- Ganja (Gilan Province, Iran)
- Ganja (Hamedan Province, Iran)
- Ganja (Isfahan Province, Iran)
- Ganja (Ilam Province, Iran)

== Other uses ==
- "Ganja Bus", a 2004 song by Cypress Hill
- Ghanjah, a large wooden trading dhow
- 1139 Ganja earthquake, natural disaster affecting Azerbaijan

== See also ==
- Gunja (disambiguation)
- "Ganja Burn", a 2018 song by Nicki Minaj
- Ganja White Night, Belgian dubstep duo
- "Must Be the Ganja", a 2009 song by rapper Eminem
