= Xaqani =

Village in Goygol Rayon, Azerbaijan

Coordinates: 40°39′N 46°11′E

Xaqani (also, Xəqani) is a village and municipality in the Goygol Rayon of Azerbaijan. It has a population of 1,922.
