= Hacıəkbərli =

- Location within Azerbaijan
- Coordinates: 40°27′N 46°18′E
- Country: Azerbaijan
- Rayon: Goygol
- Time zone: UTC+4 (AZT)
  - Summer (DST): UTC+5 (AZT)

Hacıəkbərli (also, Gadzhyakperli) is a village in the Goygol Rayon of Azerbaijan.
