= Çıraqdərə =

Place in Goygol, Azerbaijan

Çıraqdərə Ճրագիձոր • Chragidzor
- Location within Azerbaijan
- Coordinates: 40°27′32″N 46°18′00″E
- Country: Azerbaijan
- District: Goygol
- Time zone: UTC+4 (AZT)

Çıraqdərə (Armenian: Ճրագիձոր, romanized: Chragidzor; Azerbaijani: Çiragidzor, official name until 1992.) is a village in the Goygol District of Azerbaijan. The village had an Armenian population before the exodus of Armenians from Azerbaijan after the outbreak of the Nagorno-Karabakh conflict.
