= Pənahlılar =

- Municipality
- Location within Azerbaijan
- Coordinates: 40°33′34″N 46°29′40″E
- Country: Azerbaijan
- Rayon: Goygol

Population
  - Total: 1,106
- Time zone: UTC+4 (AZT)
  - Summer (DST): UTC+5 (AZT)

Pənahlılar (until 2008, Pənahlar, Panakhlar, and Panakhlyar) is a village and municipality in the Goygol Rayon of Azerbaijan. It has a population of 1,106.
