= Yeni Qızılca =

Coordinates: 40°38′N 46°14′E

Yeni Qızılca is a village in the municipality of Qızılca in the Goygol Rayon of Azerbaijan.
