= Elshad =

Elshad is a given name. Notable people with the name include:

- Elshad Abdullayev, Azerbaijani lawyer
- Elshad Ahmadov (born 1970), Azerbaijani footballer
- Elshad Akhadov (1968–1992), National Hero of Azerbaijan
- Elşad Allahverdiyev (born 1973), Azerbaijani wrestler
- Elshad Isgandarov (born 1972), Azerbaijani politician
- Elshad Mirbashir oghlu (born 1977), Azerbaijani politician
