= Fadılı =

- Location within Azerbaijan
- Coordinates: 40°38′49″N 46°11′37″E
- Country: Azerbaijan
- Rayon: Goygol
- Time zone: UTC+4 (AZT)
  - Summer (DST): UTC+5 (AZT)

Fadılı (also, Fadily and Fadyly) is a village in the Goygol Rayon of Azerbaijan.
