= Quşqara =

- Municipality
- Location within Azerbaijan
- Coordinates: 40°43′36″N 46°17′13″E
- Country: Azerbaijan
- Rayon: Goygol

Population
  - Total: 1,895
- Time zone: UTC+4 (AZT)
  - Summer (DST): UTC+5 (AZT)

Quşqara is a village and municipality in the Goygol Rayon of Azerbaijan. It has a population of 1895. The municipality consists of the villages of Quşqara, Bəhrəmbağ, and Səmədli.
