= Nizami, Goygol =

Place in Goygol, Azerbaijan

Gəncə
- Location within Azerbaijan
- Coordinates: 40°31′59″N 46°15′21″E
- Country: Azerbaijan
- Rayon: Goygol
- Municipality: Zurnabad
- Time zone: UTC+4 (AZT)

Nizami, Gəncə is a village in the Goygol Rayon of Azerbaijan. The village forms part of the municipality of Zurnabad.
