= Aşıqlı =

- Municipality
- Location within Azerbaijan
- Coordinates: 40°32′05″N 46°19′53″E
- Country: Azerbaijan
- Rayon: Goygol

Population
  - Total: 1,831
- Time zone: UTC+4 (AZT)

Aşıqlı (also, Ashygly and Voroshilovka) is a village and municipality in the Goygol Rayon of Azerbaijan. It has a population of 1,831. The municipality consists of the villages of Aşıqlı and Keşkü.
