= Edgars (department store) =

South African department store chain

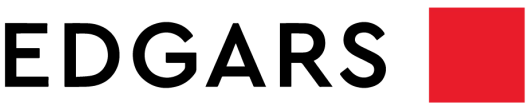
- Type: Private
- Industry: Retail
- Founded: 1929; 97 years ago
- Headquarters: Durban, South Africa
- Number of locations: ~ 200 (2020)
- Area served: Southern Africa
- Key people: Norman Drieselmann (CEO)
- Products: Clothing; Beauty products
- Owner: Retailability
- Website: edgars.co.za

Edgars is a South African chain of department stores, with locations throughout Southern Africa. Founded in 1929, it is headquartered in Johannesburg.

The chain has around 200 stores across South Africa, Namibia, Zambia and Botswana as well as in the capital cities of eSwatini, Lesotho, and Ghana. Formerly owned by Edcon, the company was sold to Durban-based private fashion company Retailability in 2020, when the former went into liquidation.

== History ==
Edgars was founded in Johannesburg, South Africa in 1929, by brothers Morris and Eli Ross. The company was named after London-based department store Swan & Edgar. Eli Ross opened his first Edgars store in Joubert Street.

The company relocated to Cape Town in 1929, before returning to Johannesburg in 1937. 1979 saw the company open its new head office called Edgardale and a distribution centre at Crown Mines. South African Breweries would purchase Edcon in 1982.

As part of Edcon, Edgars was included in an ill-fated buyout by U.S. private equity firm Bain Capital Private Equity LP in 2007, which burdened the owner with debt just as the economy suffered from the Great Recession after the 2008 financial crisis.

In 2014, Edgars opened at a new 50,000 square meter shopping centre in Nairobi, Kenya. In 2018 Edgars introduced a new, larger 8,000 square meter store in Fourways Mall in Johannesburg, featuring trees, play areas, a coffee shop, “beauty rooms” where customers can get makeovers, and a section that allows customers to print their own text or images on clothing. Edgars promoted the new prototype store design as "a bit like a town square, a multi-sensory, tree-lined central social space".

In January 2020, it announced it would close its 6,000 square meter store in the upscale Rosebank Mall in Johannesburg suburb Rosebank.

In June 2020, Edcon put the chain up for sale due to economic difficulties stemming from the COVID-19 pandemic. On 7 July 2020 it was announced that Edcon has signed an agreement to sell the chain to Durban-based Retailability, which operated 460 stores across Southern Africa and was the owner of brands Legit, which Edcon had sold to Retailability four years prior, Beaver Canoe (Swagga), and Style. Retailability acquired 130 of 194 Edgars stores.

In September of the same year, the company under the new leadership announced that it was repositioning Edgars as a mass market brand focused on fashion and beauty products, shifting from its previous higher end fashion and homeware portfolio.

In 2025, Edgars downsized a number of its South African stores, as part of its plans to reduce rentals and increase profitability.
