= Zurnabad =

- Municipality
- Location within Azerbaijan
- Coordinates: 40°30′22″N 46°14′25″E
- Country: Azerbaijan
- Rayon: Goygol

Population
  - Total: 1,273
- Time zone: UTC+4 (AZT)
  - Summer (DST): UTC+5 (AZT)

Zurnabad (also, Surnabab, Zhurnadad, and Zurnadad) is a village and municipality in the Goygol Rayon of Azerbaijan. It has a population of 1,273. The municipality consists of the villages of Zurnabad, Aşağı Zurnabad, and Gəncə.
