= Central News Agency =

Central News Agency may refer to:

- Central News Agency (London), a news agency active in Victorian London
- Central News Agency (Taiwan), the state news agency of Taiwan
- CNA (bookstore), a South African book store chain
  - Central News Agency Literary Award
- Korean Central News Agency, the state news agency of North Korea

== See also ==
- CNA (disambiguation)
