= Hacıməlik =

Place in Goygol, Azerbaijan

- Location within Azerbaijan
- Coordinates: 40°37′57″N 46°24′29″E
- Country: Azerbaijan
- Rayon: Goygol

Population
  - Total: 3,871
- Time zone: UTC+4 (AZT)

Hacıməlik (known as Əzizbəyov until 1999) is a village and municipality in the Goygol Rayon of Azerbaijan. It has a population of 3,871.
