= Topalhəsənli, Kurdamir =

Topalhəsənli
- Municipality
- Location within Azerbaijan
- Coordinates: 40°23′02″N 48°11′49″E
- Country: Azerbaijan
- Rayon: Kurdamir
- Time zone: UTC+4 (AZT)
  - Summer (DST): UTC+5 (AZT)

Topalhəsənli (also, Topalgasanli and Topalgasanly) is a village and municipality in the Kurdamir Rayon of Azerbaijan.
