= Sveti Lovreč Pazenatički =

Sveti Lovreč Pazenatički San Lorenzo del Pasenatico
- Village
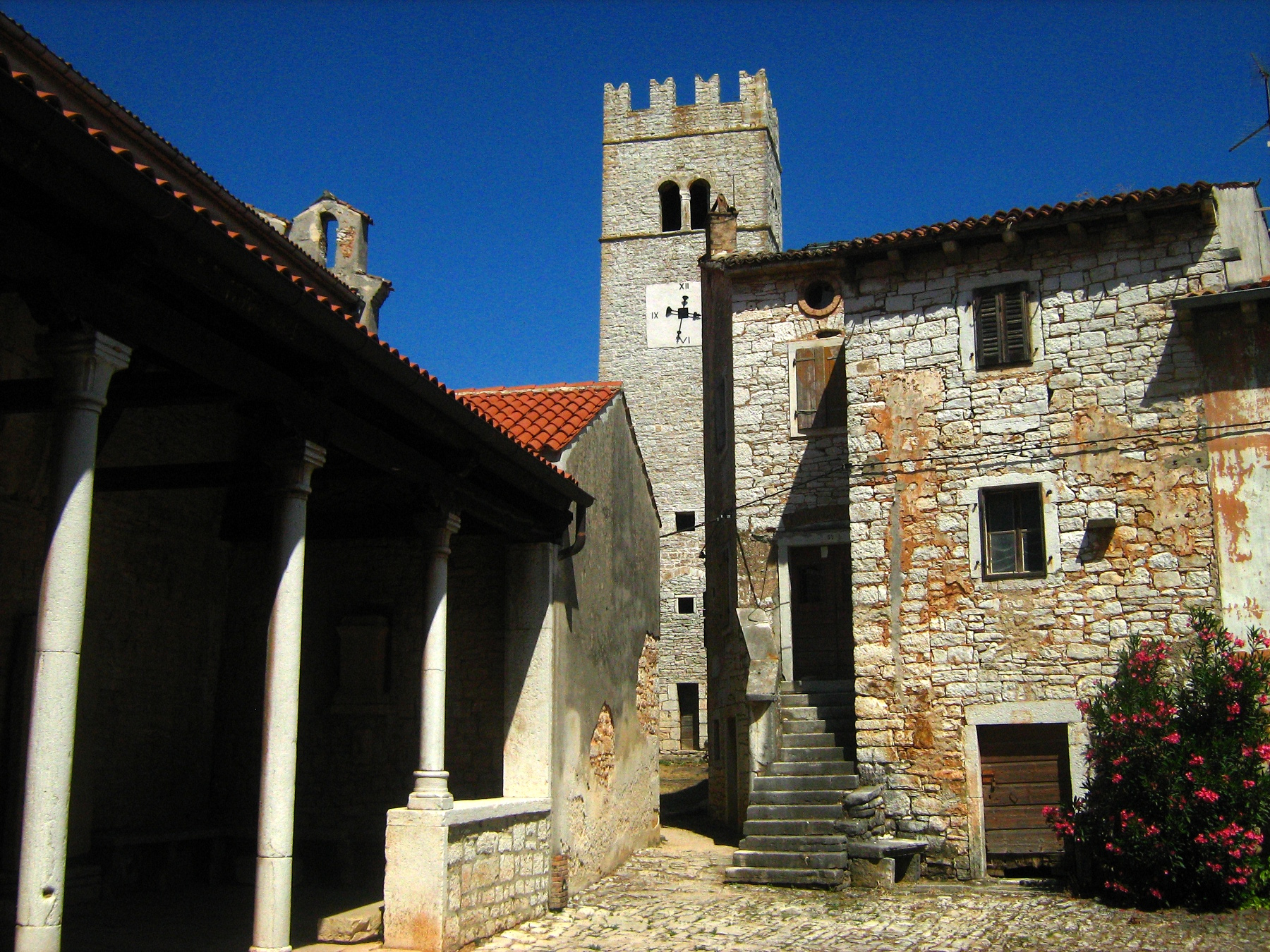

- Location within Croatia
- Coordinates: 45.1767844°N 13.7261505°E
- Country: Croatia
- County: Istria County
- Municipality: Sveti Lovreč

Population (2021)
  - Total: 267
- Time zone: UTC+1 (CET)
  - Summer (DST): UTC+2 (CEST)
- Postal code: 52448 Sveti Lovreč
- Area code: 052

Sveti Lovreč Pazenatički (Italian: San Lorenzo del Pasenatico) is a village in the municipality of Sveti Lovreč, Istria in Croatia.

== Demographics ==
According to the 2021 census, its population was 267.
