= Gunja =

Gunja may refer to:

- Ganja, a name for cannabis (spelt "gunja" in Australian Aboriginal English)
- Gunja, Croatia, a village and a municipality in eastern Croatia
- Gunja, Iran, a village in Gilan Province, Iran
- Gunja, Pakistan, a village in Punjab, Pakistan
- Gunja Station, a station of Seoul Subway in South Korea
- Gunja-dong, a neighbourhood of Gwangjin-gu in Seoul, South Korea

== See also ==
- Ganja
