= Göygöl (lake) =

Lake in Azerbaijan

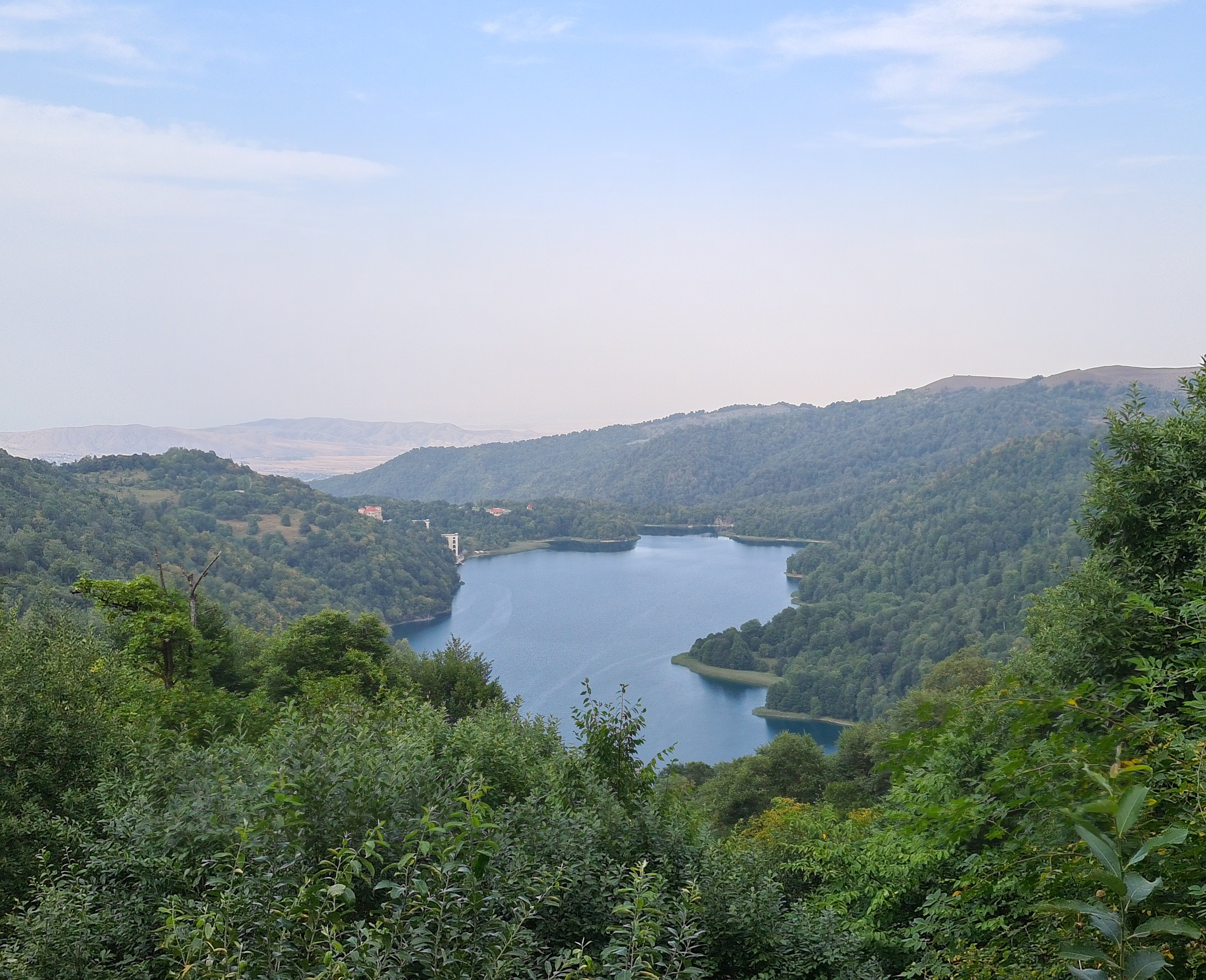

- Location within Azerbaijan
- Interactive map of Göygöl
- Coordinates: 40°24′32.8″N 46°19′26.8″E
- Type: Landslide dam
- Basin countries: Azerbaijan
- Max. length: 2.8 km (1.7 mi)
- Max. width: 0.8 km (0.50 mi)
- Surface area: 0.78 km^{2} (0.30 sq mi)
- Average depth: 30 m (98 ft)
- Max. depth: 96 m (315 ft)
- Surface elevation: 1,553.3 m (5,096 ft)

Göygöl (lit. 'Blue Lake') is a natural lake in Azerbaijan. It is situated at the footsteps of Murovdag, not far from Ganja in the Goygol District. The lake is 0.78 km² and is 1553.3 metres above sea level. Its length from south to north is 2800 metres, and its maximum width is 800 metres.

== History ==
Due to an earthquake which hit the area on 25 September 1139, parts of the Kapaz Mount collapsed and blocked the path of the Kürəkçay River. As a result of diversion of water flow, a lake with pure mountain water was created. Hence, the name given, signifying the pureness of the water. The nearby city of Khanlar was renamed after the Göygöl Lake on 25 April 2008. The city was founded as Helenendorf by the first German settlers in Azerbaijan in 1819 and with a considerable German minority until 1941 had been renamed to Khanlar in 1938. In 1941, German settlers were relocated by Soviet authorities to Kazakhstan and Central Asia and Siberia on Joseph Stalin's orders.

In 1925, the lake was incorporated into the newly founded "Goy Gol State Reserve" which was superseded as Göygöl National Park in 2008.

== General information ==
Greater Göygöl area is often split into 19 lakes, 8 of which fall into the large lake category, Maralgol, Zelilgöl, Qaragöl among them. It is situated at 1,556 meters above the sea level. The complete length reaches 6,460 meters. The depth of the lake is 93 meters. Due to the pureness of the water, one can see underwater life clearly 8–10 meters below the surface. The lake is very rich in fauna. The Göygöl Trout has evolved from the river trout since the natural creation of the lake. The Göygöl area is known for dry winters and mild to warm summers. Rainfalls range from 600 to 900 mm. There is an Azerbaijani Army corps close to Göygöl. The lake is a major tourist attraction during the spring and summer seasons. In 2009, more than 4500 tourists visited Goygol. Among the tourists, many are German nationals. In the vicinity of Göygöl, there are settlements once populated by ethnic Germans, many monuments of German culture and an old German Lutheran church built in 1854.

== In popular culture ==
Due to its beauty, the lake has been an inspiration for many novels, poems and music bands.
