= Çaylı, Goygol =

Çaylı
- Municipality
- Location within Azerbaijan
- Coordinates: 40°35′29″N 46°30′23″E
- Country: Azerbaijan
- Rayon: Goygol

Population
  - Total: 875
- Time zone: UTC+4 (AZT)
  - Summer (DST): UTC+5 (AZT)

Çaylı (also, Chayly) is a village and municipality in the Goygol Rayon of Azerbaijan. It has a population of 875.
