= Centre for Nonviolent Action =

- Abbreviation: CNA
- Formation: 1997; 29 years ago
- Type: NGO
- Legal status: Nonprofit
- Purpose: Building of sustainable peace in the region of former Yugoslavia
- Headquarters: Sarajevo, Bosnia and Herzegovina, and Belgrade, Serbia
- Region served: Balkan
- Methods: peace education, publishing and video production

Centre for Nonviolent Action (Serbo-Croatian: Centar za nenasilnu akciju, abbr. CNA) is a peace organization focused on building sustainable peace in the region of former Yugoslavia. It was founded in 1997 in Sarajevo, Bosnia and Herzegovina, and expanded to Belgrade, Serbia in 2001. The organisation's main objective is to promote nonviolence and dialogue through trust-building among people from the region as well as a constructive approach to dealing with the past.

== Mission ==
CNA focuses on cross-border work throughout the Balkan countries. Its mission is to achieve sustainable societies, in which people value diversity, critical thinking, taking responsibility for their community, and willingness to reassess one's attitudes. Their work focuses on the promotion of peace as a basic social value, with the main focus of dealing with the history of the Balkan region.

== Background ==
The Yugoslav Wars had a strong ethnopolitical background. In the post-war period, there was a strong need to find constructive ways to deal with the sufferings and disasters caused by the wars. CNA was founded as an initiative to bring together people from opposite sides, and to overcome the feeling of "being enemies" due to different cultural and ethnical backgrounds.

Centre for Nonviolent Action was founded by Nenad Vukosavljevic, a peace activist from Belgrade, in September 1997, in Sarajevo, Bosnia and Herzegovina. The organization was started with the support of the German NGO Kurve Wustrow, an educational center for nonviolent actions. Throughout various phases of CNA's work, Berghof Research Centre for Constructive Conflict Management has been offering support in terms of supervision and advice. In 2001, a second office was opened in Belgrade, Serbia.

== Tools ==
In order to achieve their values, CNA implements various tools, including peace education, peacebuilding, publications and video production.

=== Training ===
CNA works with various groups including teachers, journalists, activists, social workers, youth workers, and political party activists. Its main target group is young people working for NGOs, political parties and youth organizations, who are able and willing to spread their skills to the community. Since their founding, CNA organized several training programmes.

Basic and advance trainings bring people from Croatia, Bosnia and Herzegovina, North Macedonia, Montenegro, Serbia and Kosovo. Those programs focus on prejudice reduction, mutual trust building and constructive dealing with the past. Training for ex-combatants is organized for soldiers who actively participated in wars in Bosnia and Herzegovina and Croatia in different armies, and focuses on encouraging dialogues and empowering veterans to participate in peace building. "Mir-Paqe-Мир training" has been held every year since 2015 and pays special attention to understanding the context of Kosovo, North Macedonia, and Serbia. CNA also organizes training for students from Bosnia and Herzegovina, with goal of developing peacebuilding foundations for future generations of public opinion and policy makers.

=== Work with war veterans ===
The organization wants to work with war veterans from the 1990s in a "constructive" way. At the beginning of the project, right after the war, the organization was working only with civilians, mostly young people. However, in 2002, war veterans were included as a target group, as part of the project "Dealing with the Past". Many veterans were open to dialog and willing to work on reconciliation. Compared to the young civilians, they had a much greater impact on local media. Over time, the peace activities from CNA involved several groups of veteran associations in the cities across former Yugoslavia, and continued to hold trainings and public meetings.

=== Documentaries ===
CNA created a series of movies and documentaries.

- "Small Faculty of Activism" (film, 2017). This film features Training of Trainers from 2014.
- "Alien Home" (documentary, 2017). Its goal is to portrait the pain of those who are forced to migrate their home.
- "The Fortress" (short film, 2013). Based on the book by Mesa Selimovic, in memory of a girl from Bosnia.
- "Visits of Veterans" (documentary, 2009). Documentary film about joint visit of combats from Bosnia, Serbia and Croatia to the place of suffering.
- "Not a Bird to be Heard" (documentary, 2007). Simulated dialog between Bosnians and Croatians. Theme is the war, suffering, hatred, pain, and difficulty of the past.
- "All Wish to Cast the Stone" (documentary, 2006). Film from the series of simulated dialogs, which deals with attitudes between people of Serbian and Croatian descent.
- "It Cannot Last Forever" (documentary, 2006). Documentary from the series of simulated dialogs, focused on attitudes of Serbians and Croatians ten years after the war in Bosnia.
- "Traces" (documentary, 2004). Four former combats share their motivation to leave the war in the 1990s, their current views of the past, and knowledge they obtain in the meantime.

== Criticism ==
During the first phase in Serbia in 2002, CNA dealt with some resistance. At one public event, a journalist questioned the credibility of a panel member by emphasizing her past employment in a newspaper that was close to Milosevic's regime. On another occasion, one of the local veteran associations tried to disrupt the panel debate.

Some of the speakers in the first forum held political positions and there was an impression that they tried to use public forums for their agenda.

A few days before a public forum in Sarajevo in 2004, CNA received a phone call from the veteran organization Green Berets, whose members opposed the idea of the forum. A lot of people attending the forum experienced the horrors of the wars and were not willing to address this experience.

Some feedback from panels in Serbia and Bosnia was a necessity to involve people with more nationalist learning and to organize these panels across the wider region.

== Awards ==
- 2019 Krunoslav Sukić Accolade, awarded in recognition of contributions to peacebuilding, nonviolence and human rights.
