= Maralgöl =

Lake in Azerbaijan

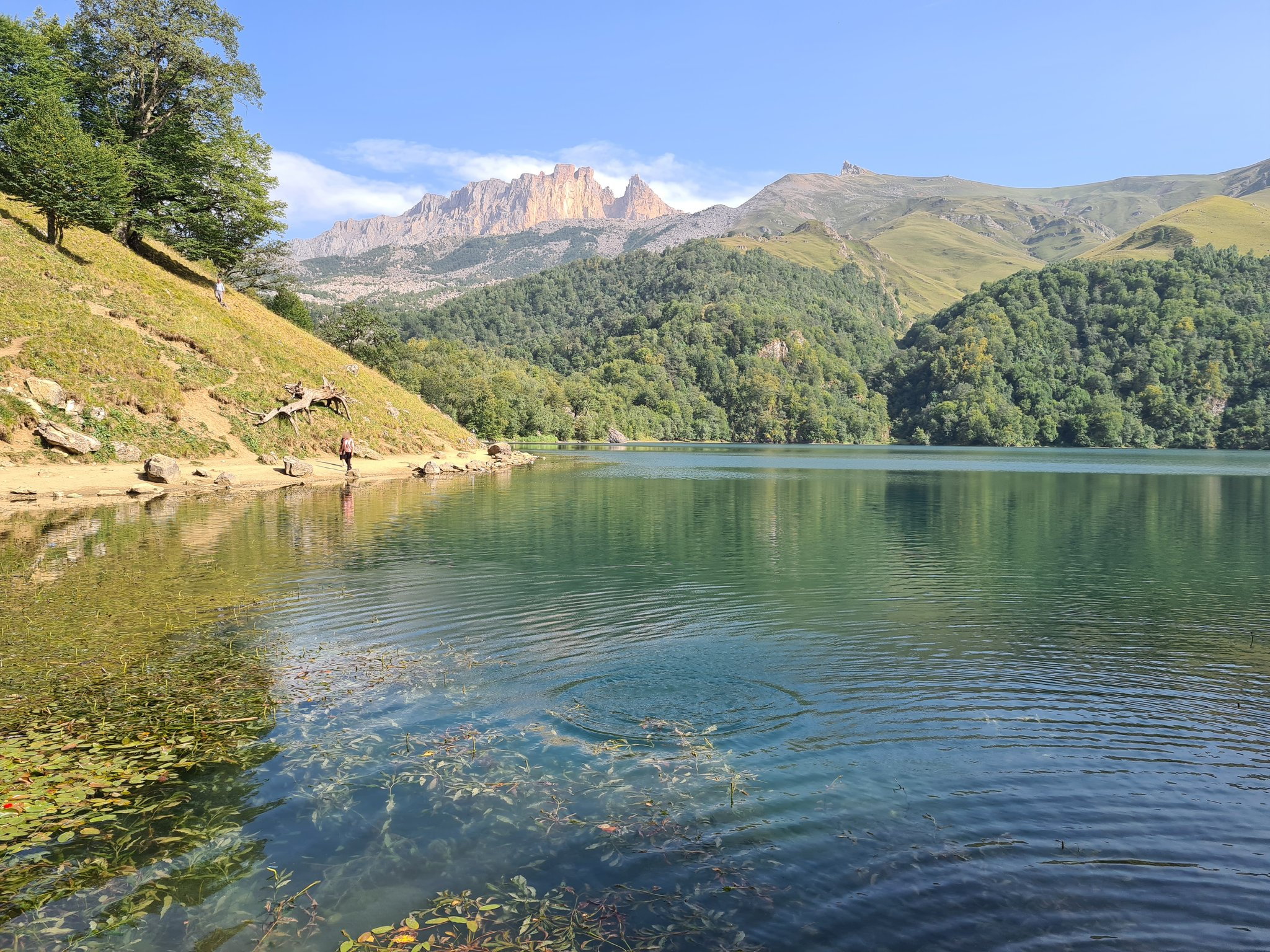

- Location within Azerbaijan
- Interactive map of Maralgöl
- Location: Azerbaijan
- Coordinates: 40°22′30″N 46°18′50″E
- Type: lake
- Surface area: 23 hectares (57 acres)
- Max. depth: 61 metres (200 ft)
- Surface elevation: 1,902 metres (6,240 ft)

Maralgöl is a mountainous lake at an elevation of 1,910 metres (6,270 ft) on Mount Murovdag in western Azerbaijan. The lake has an area of 23 hectares (57 acres) and the greatest depth is 61 metres (200 ft). Maralgol is connected with the Göygöl lake, via the Aghsu River. The collapse of rocks caused by a severe earthquake in 1139 resulted in the formation of this lake, which impeded the path of the local river. The lake is surrounded by the marshland, typical moorland, mountains and dense forests. Out of the eight nearby alpine lakes, it is regarded as one of the most beautiful and attractive in the country.
