= 1139 Ganja earthquake =

Natural disaster in Azerbaijan and Georgia

- Location within Azerbaijan
- Local date: 30 September 1139
- Magnitude: 7.0–7.3 M_{w}, 7.5 M_{s}, 7.7 M_{LH},
- Depth: 16–23 km (9.9–14.3 mi)
- Epicenter: 40.3°N 46.2°E
- Areas affected: Seljuk Empire (present-day Azerbaijan)
- Max. intensity: MMI IX–XI
- Casualties: 230,000–300,000 dead (estimation)

The 1139 Ganja earthquake was one of the worst seismic events in history. It affected the Seljuk Empire and the Kingdom of Georgia, in modern-day Azerbaijan and Georgia. The earthquake had an estimated magnitude of 7.0–7.3 M_{w}, 7.5 M_{s}, and 7.7 M_{LH}. A disputed death toll of 230,000–300,000 resulted from this event, making it one of the deadliest earthquakes ever recorded.

== Tectonic setting ==
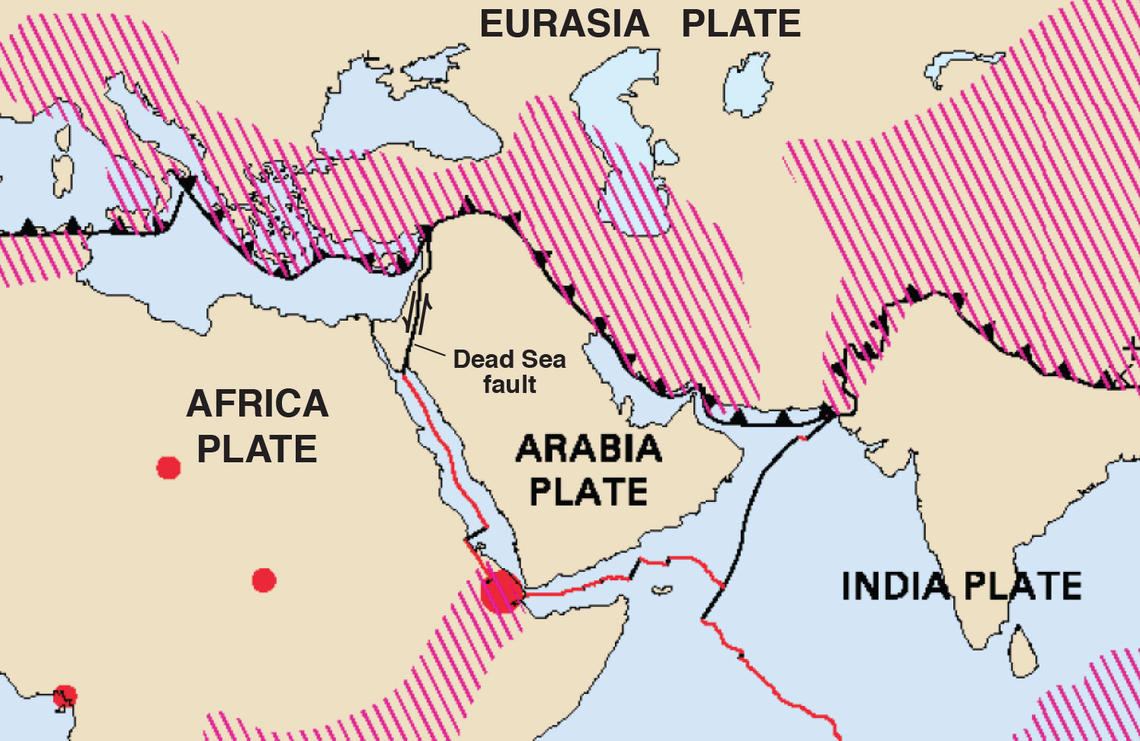
The Eurasia-African-Arabian-Indian convergent zone

Azerbaijan, Armenia and Georgia are located in an area of high seismic activity as the three countries are situated in the collision zone between the Eurasian and Arabian plates. The collision zone consists of an accreted island arc that collided after the closure of the Tethys Ocean, continental blocks, and sediments from the Mesozoic and Tertiary eras. The area is separated into three geographical regions; Lesser Caucasus, Kura Basin and Greater Caucasus. Seismic activity in the Lesser Caucasus is typically associated with strike-slip faults with vertical dip angles. In the Greater Caucasus, seismic activity corresponds to thrust faulting. Extending 100–160 km (62–99 mi) beneath the Greater Caucasus is the remnant of a subducted tectonic plate after the ocean closed. Earthquakes are caused by crustal compression and shear as the two tectonic plates interact.

== Earthquake ==
The earthquake had an estimated moment magnitude of 7.0–7.3 and 7.7 or 7.5 on the surface-wave magnitude scale at a depth of 16–23 kilometres (9.9–14.3 mi). A maximum intensity of IX (Violent) to XI (Extreme) on the Mercalli intensity scale was assigned. It was also perceived as far as Aleppo where the felt intensity was II (Weak).

An epicenter location at 40.3°N 46.2°E, near Ganja, was suggested by researchers. This region of the Lesser Caucasus is dominated by oblique and strike-slip tectonics. The fault responsible for the earthquake, the Pambak-Sevan-Syunik Fault, is a 490-kilometer-long WNW–ESE striking strike-slip fault. For the majority of its length, it demonstrates right-lateral displacement, but at the westernmost segment, its slip sense is left-lateral. The earthquake ruptured the Mrav segment of the fault at its eastern end. Unlike the rest of the Pambak-Sevan-Syunik Fault, the Mrav segment is characterized by a series of north-dipping thrust faults. Paleoseismology in the region indicate large earthquakes of up to M_{w} 7.5 have occurred on the fault. The Pambak-Sevan-Syunik Fault was also responsible for an earthquake in 1931.

== Damage ==
The Gates of Ganja at the Gelati Monastery

Mkhitar Gosh, an Armenian scholar and writer, quoted Job 9:6 and Psalm 103:32 from the Holy Bible to describe the earthquake. He wrote of tremendous damage in the P'ar'isos and Xach'e'n districts of Syunik. The city of Ganzak was also devastated, leaving many of its residents buried under ruins. Many structures, including monasteries and churches, castles and villages in the mountainous region, were totally destroyed. Strong shaking triggered massive landslides off the sides of mountains and canyons in the Caucasus Mountains region. Parts of Kapaz Mount collapsed, and the resulting landslide blocked the Kürəkçay River, forming Lake Göygöl. Another six lakes formed, including Maral-gol and Lake Ağgöl.

The number of people who died in the mountains is not known, described as "incalculable". Estimates of the death toll range between 230,000 and 300,000, making it one of the deadliest earthquakes in history. Among the dead were two sons of the ruler of the Seljuk Empire, Qara Sonqor. The death toll figure remains controversial with some authors stating it is an exaggeration considering the population of the area at the time of the disaster. Others argued that this was a conflation of information about the 1138 Aleppo and 1137 Jazira earthquakes.

== Aftermath ==
King Demetrius I of Georgia took advantage of the earthquake and looted the city. Troops stole many artifacts and prized items from the city, including the Ancient Gates of Ganja, which were treated as a trophy. The city was reconstructed by Qara Sonqor, and it again began to flourish.

== See also ==
- List of earthquakes in Azerbaijan
- List of earthquakes in Georgia
- List of historical earthquakes
- Lists of earthquakes
