= Edcon =

South African retail company

Edcon Limited
- Type: Public
- Traded as: ZSE: EDGR
- Industry: Retail
- Founded: 6 September 1929; 97 years ago
- Founder: Sydney Press
- Headquarters: Johannesburg, CBD Bree street, Johannesburg, South Africa
- Products: Clothing, footwear, accessories, sporting goods
- Services: clothing retail, homeware retail, stationery retail
- Revenue: R28.7 billion
- Number of employees: 44,000
- Parent: Bain Capital
- Subsidiaries: Edgars Consolidated Department Stores
- Website: edcon.co.za

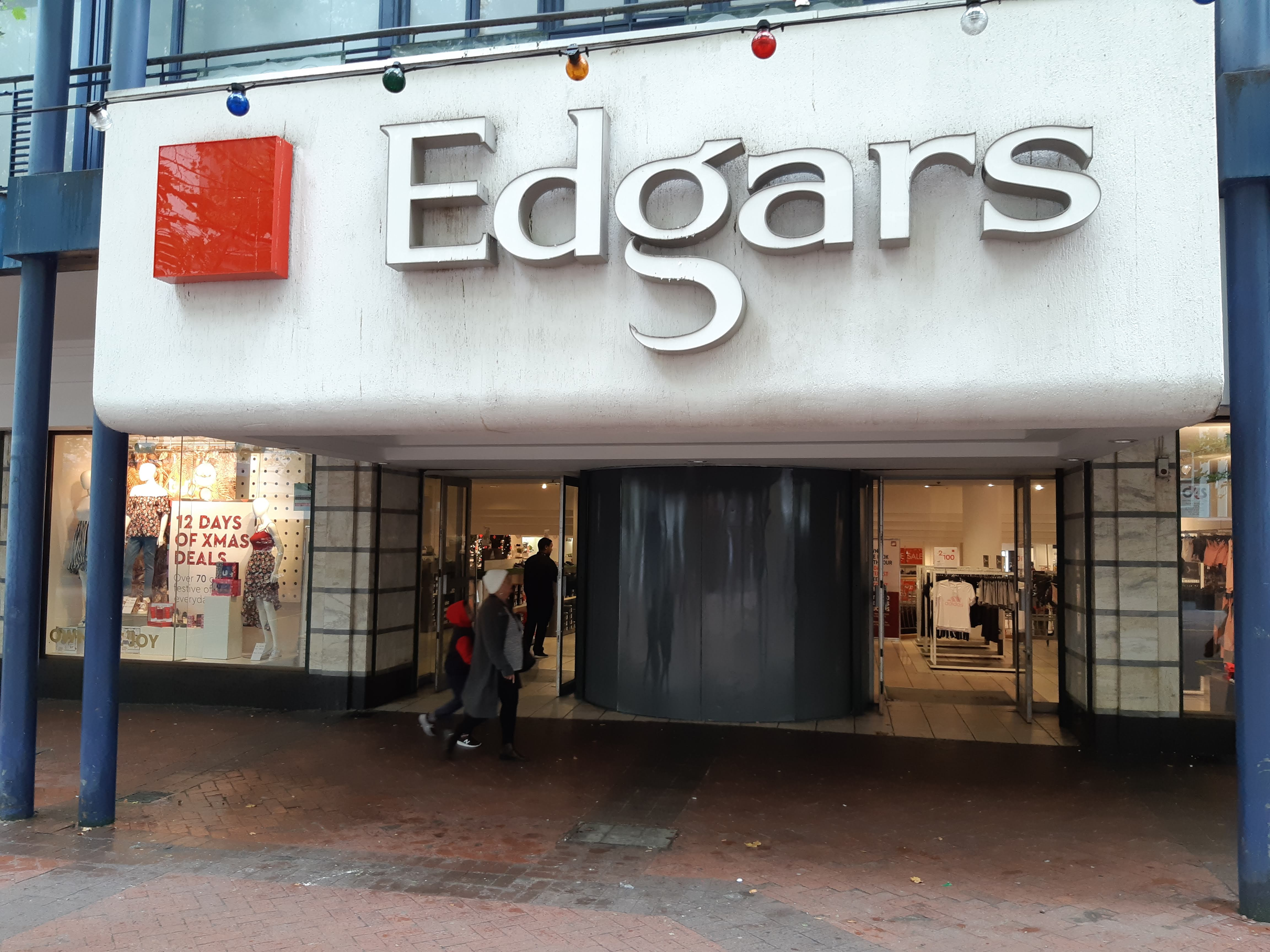
Edgars is the primary and original brand of Edcon.

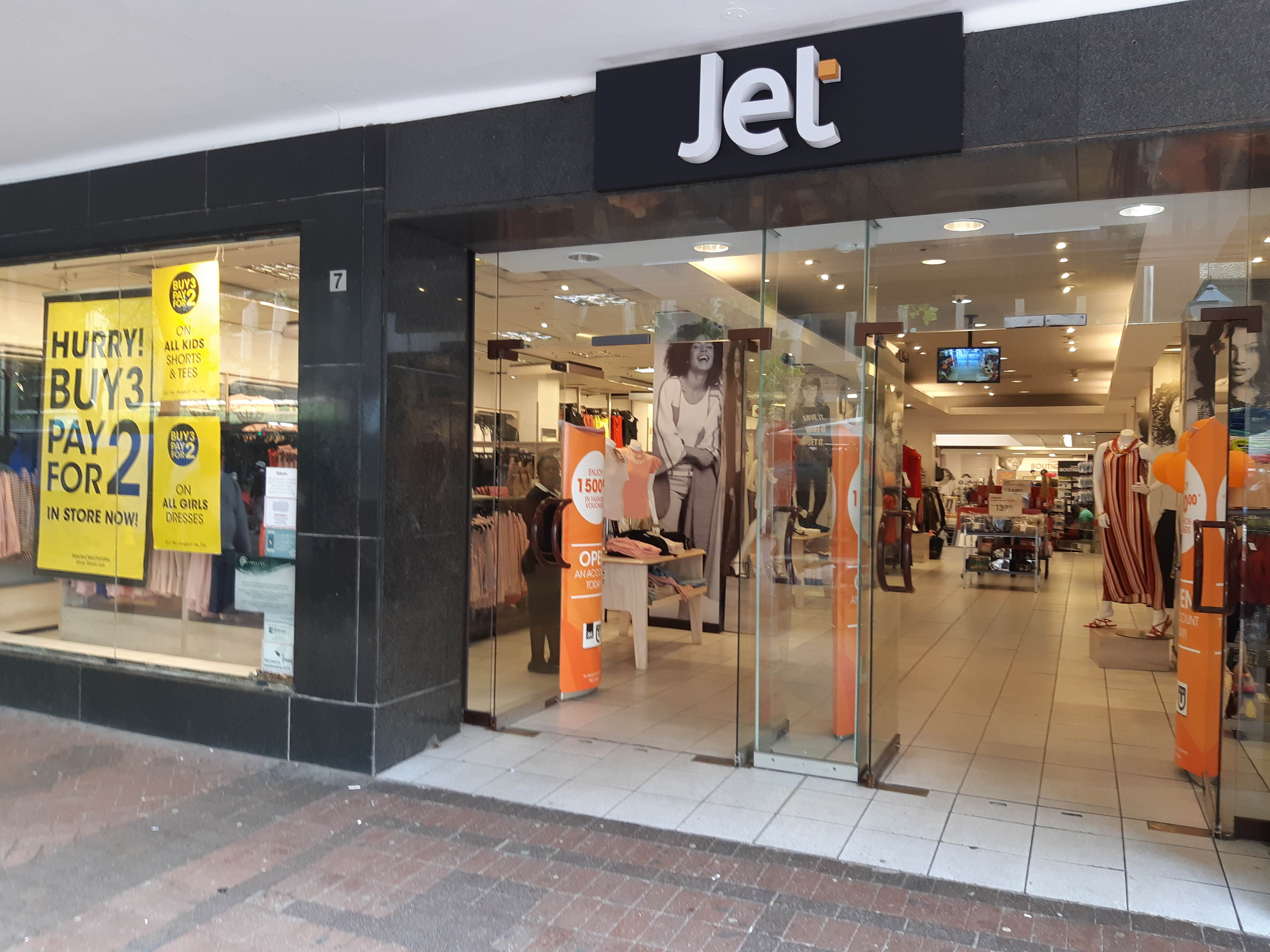
A Jet clothing store in Cape Town.

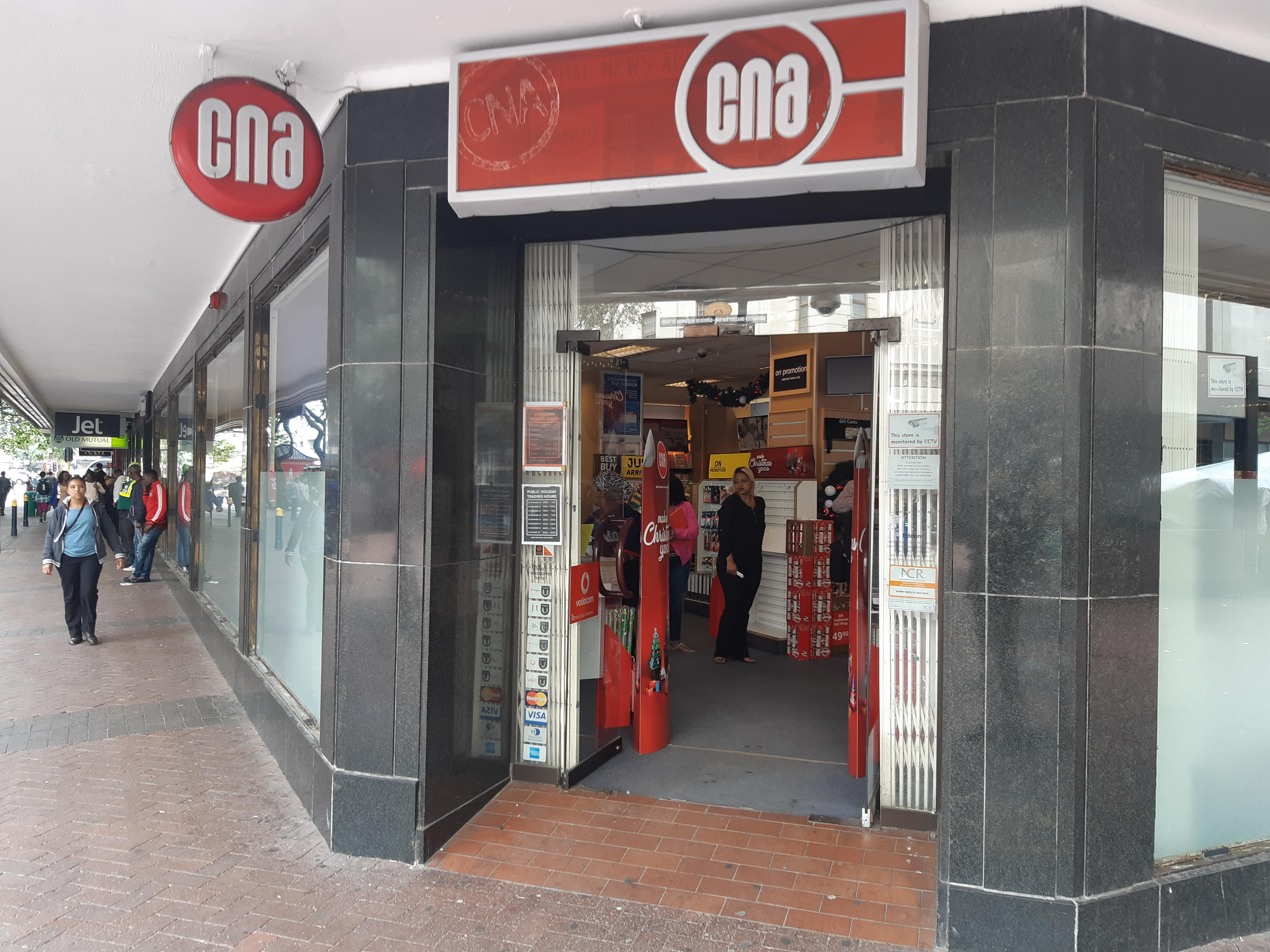
A CNA book and stationery store.

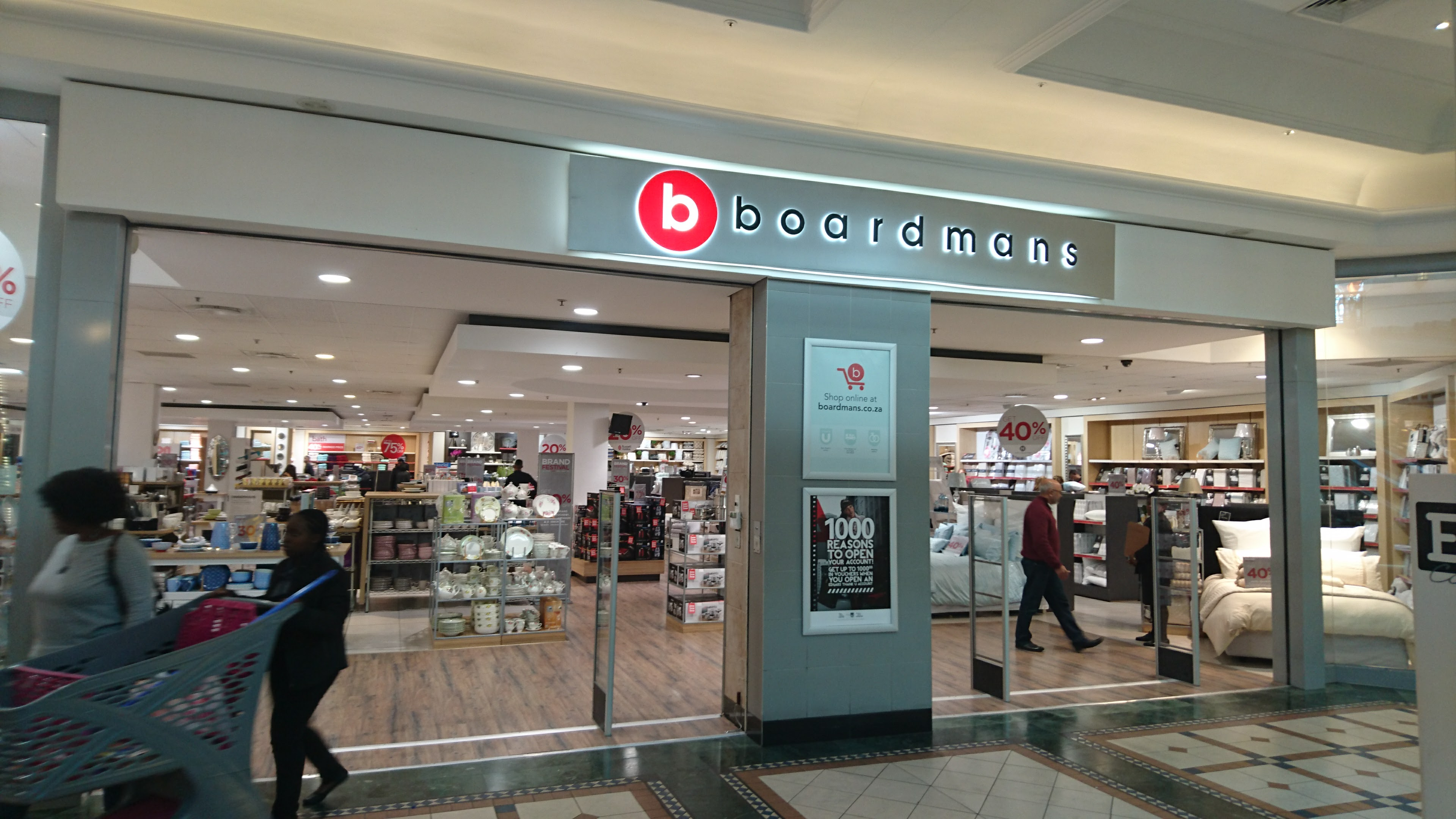
A Boardmans storefront in Canal Walk mall in 2016, two years before the brand was discontinued.

Edcon Limited was a retail company based in Johannesburg, South Africa. Its subsidiaries included Edgars, a department store with 203 branches. In 2020, the Competition Tribunal approved the sale of the Edgars division to Retailability (pty) Ltd, and Jet to The Foschini Group.

== History ==
Edcon Ltd was the leading clothing, footwear and textiles (CFT) retailing group in South Africa trading through a range of retail formats. The first Edgars store was opened on 6 September 1929 in Joubert Street, Johannesburg by Sydney Press. It was listed on the Johannesburg Stock Exchange in 1949 and opened its first stores outside of South Africa in Botswana, Lesotho and Swaziland (now Eswatini) in 1966-69. Since then, the Company had grown to ten retail brands trading in (as of 2014) over 1,400 stores in South Africa, Botswana, Namibia, Eswatini, Lesotho, Ghana, Zimbabwe and Zambia.

In 1982 the company, still known as Edgars, was acquired by South African Breweries. It launched its Red Square retail chain in 1996 and acquired the struggling stationery retailer CNA in 2002 for R130 million. The company acquired the houseware retailer Boardmans in 2004 for R94 million.

Edcon Financial Services provided credit facilities and financial services products to the Group's over 4 million cardholders. In November 2015, according to reports, Edcon Limited referred to the National Consumer Tribunal. In October 2017, it was reported that Edcon rewarded its customers with a revitalised ''thank U'' customer reward programme.

Bain Capital concluded a private equity deal that delisted the group from the Johannesburg Stock Exchange in 2007. Following the delisting the company experienced numerous challenges.

In early 2020, during the COVID-19 pandemic, the company ceased to pay rents for its retail locations while the resultant lockdowns in South Africa prevented businesses from operating. The group has subsequently gone into Business Rescue with a number of their subsidiaries being sold off to other Fashion Retail Holding Companies.

== Financial trouble ==
Following the private equity takeover by Bain Capital, Edcon had a succession of CEOs, lost significant market share, and struggled with an oversupply of leased floorspace. This was partly due to an increase in cheaper imported clothing and the increasing move to online shopping by customers.

In 2016 the company recorded a net debt of R24.7 billion and was temporarily taken over by debtors to avoid financial collapse. This resulted in the closure of 253 stores by 2018 as part of a recovery plan and by 2017 the company had reduced its level of net debt to R4.2 billion. In July 2018 Edcon announced that it was closing its Boardmans homeware and La Senza stores.

In January 2018, Grant Pattison became CEO.

In December 2018 it was reported in the Sunday Times that Edcon and its subsidiaries were on the brink of financial collapse and was seeking a deal with mall owners to reduce rental payments. Edcon disputed the reports but did state that it was working towards eliminating company debt and a deal to prevent the closure of its stores. The possible 44,000 direct and additional 100,000 indirect job losses should the company stop trading was used by trade union SAFTU to criticise President Ramaphosa's economic policies.

Following the COVID-19 lockdown in South Africa in 2020, Edcon announced that they had filed for business rescue and that approximately 5,000 jobs were on the line. On the 8th of September 2020, The Competition Tribunal approved the sale of Edgars to Durban Based, private fashion company Retailability, who owns three other brands, Legit, Style and Beaver Canoe. The Competition Tribunal also approved the sale of JET to The Foschini Group saving an additional undisclosed number of jobs in the process. The CNA Group was sold to a Mauritian Holding Company.

== Divisions ==
Brand	Market	Revenue (2015) in millions of Rands	Operating Profit (2018) in millions of Rands
Edgars	fashion	13,929	1,305
Edgars Zimbabwe	fashion	799	101
CNA	stationery	2,011	35
Discount/Jet	fashion	10,771	1,220
Red Square	fashion	-	-
Prato	fashion	CLOSED	CLOSED
Boardmans	homeware	CLOSED	CLOSED

Defined by the target markets served, all retail business is structured under two divisions:

- Department Stores Division (serving middle and upper income markets):
  - Edgars (operates in Botswana, Lesotho, Namibia, Swaziland, South Africa, Zambia)
  - CNA (operates in South Africa, Lesotho, Botswana and Namibia)
  - Boardmans (operated in Botswana, South Africa, Namibia) (CLOSED in 2018)
  - Prato (operated in South Africa) (CLOSED)
  - Red Square
  - Temptations (CLOSED)
- Discount Division including (serving middle to lower income markets):
  - Jet (operates in Botswana, Lesotho, Namibia, South Africa, Swaziland, Zambia).
    - Jet Mart
    - Jet Shoes
  - Blacksnow (CLOSED)

The company's shares are publicly listed on the Johannesburg Securities Exchange and Zimbabwe Stock Exchange, and is part of the Zimbabwe Industrial Index.
