= Center for Transportation and Logistics Neuer Adler =

CNA e.V.
- Center for Transportation and Logistics Neuer Adler
- Abbreviation: CNA
- Location: Theresienstraße 9, D-90403 Nuremberg, Germany
- Coordinates: 49.456049°N 11.07908°E
- Region served: Nuremberg region
- Services: Mutual synergies within the transport and logistics sectors
- Official language: German, English
- Managing Director: Rudolf Aunkofer, Phd
- Website: cna-ev.de

Center for Transportation and Logistics Neuer Adler (CNA) is a German association for industries active in the transport and logistics sectors. The name "Neuer Adler" alludes to Adler, the first railway locomotive in Germany.
