= Mount Kapaz =

Mountain in Azerbaijan

- Kəpəz dağı
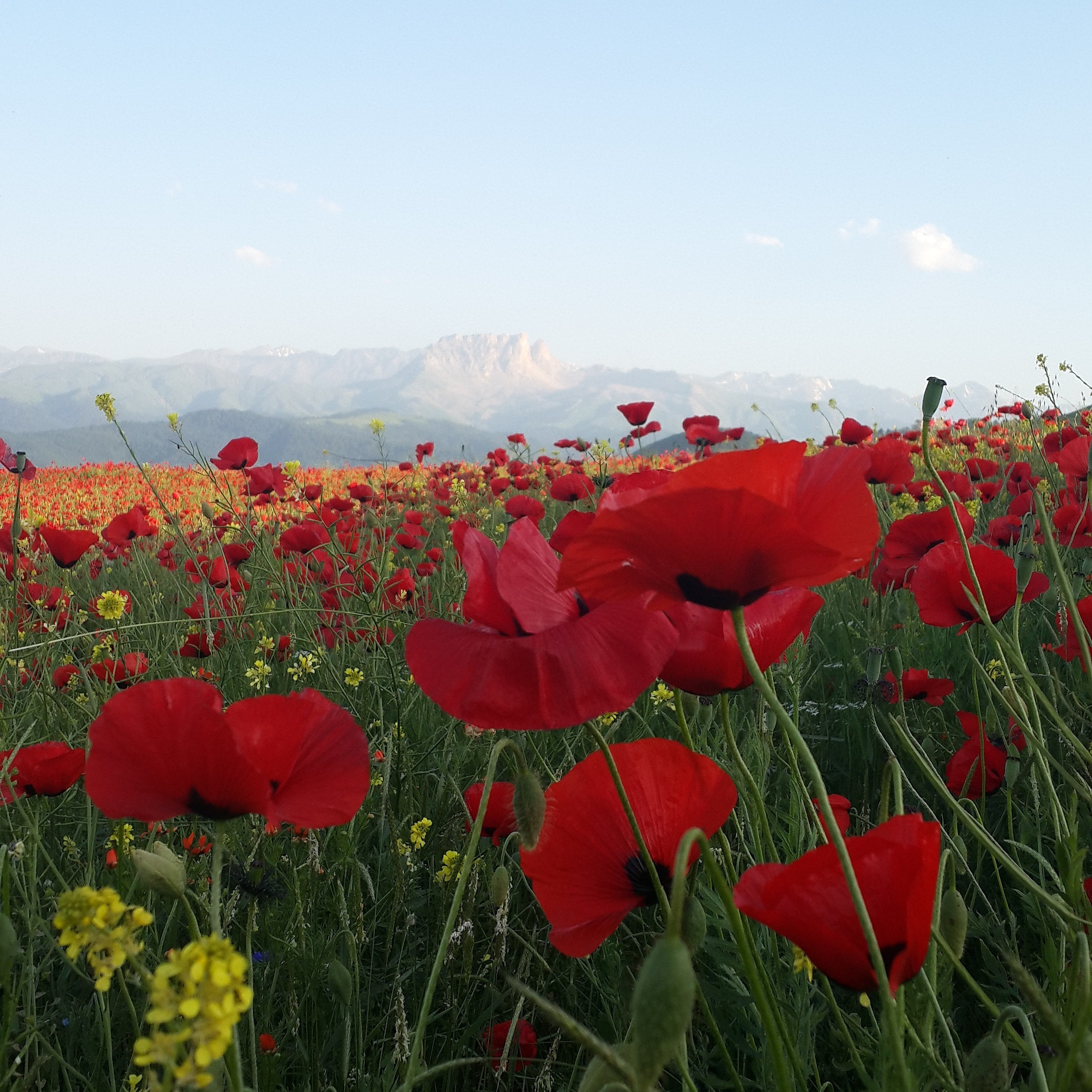

Highest point
- Elevation: 3,066 m (10,059 ft)
- Coordinates: 40°18′3″N 46°15′46″E

Geography
- Location within Caucasus Mountains Location within Europe Location within Azerbaijan
- Location: Azerbaijan
- Country: Azerbaijan
- Parent range: Lesser Caucasus

Mount Kapaz or Kepez (Azerbaijani: Kəpəz dağı) is a mountain in Lesser Caucasus near Ganja city in central Azerbaijan. Kapaz rises 3,066 metres (10,059 ft) above the sea level. It is located next to Lake Göygöl; during the 1139 Ganja earthquake, huge rocks broke off the mountain and blocked a nearby river, creating the lake. In the Middle Ages, the mount was also called "Alparak", a name borrowed from Alparak lake (now Göygöl) translated from ancient Turkic languages as "the place covered by dam" (Al – below, lower part, space in front of something; parak – dam), referring to the big rocks which blocked the Agsu river and creating a lake.

The glacial meltwater on the mountain feed the waters of Göygöl. The famous Göygöl Winery uses some of that pure water for production of certains brands of vodka such as "Khan-VIP", "Khan Export" and "Khan Premium" which gained it gold and bronze medals at "United Vodka-2008" competition in Brussels.

Archeological findings of ancient communal items in recent years near Kapaz and Qoshqar mounts and near the Kura River in the vicinity of Ganja confirm the area was a place of early inhabitants.

== See also ==
- Ganja, Azerbaijan
- Lake Göygöl
