= Topalhəsənli, Goygol =

Topalhəsənli
- Municipality
- Location within Azerbaijan
- Coordinates: 40°33′21″N 46°12′45″E
- Country: Azerbaijan
- Rayon: Goygol

Population
  - Total: 1,715
- Time zone: UTC+4 (AZT)
  - Summer (DST): UTC+5 (AZT)

Topalhəsənli (also, Topalgasanli, Topalgasanly, and Topalkhasanly) is a village and municipality in the Goygol Rayon of Azerbaijan. It has a population of 1,715.
