= CNA (bookstore) =

South African retail store chain

CNA; Central News Agency; Consolidated News Agencies
- Company type: Private
- Industry: Retail
- Founded: 1896; 130 years ago
- Founder: Michael Davis and Albert Lindbergh
- Headquarters: Johannesburg, South Africa
- Services: stationery retail
- Revenue: R2 billion (2015)
- Operating income: R614 million (2015)
- Net income: R35 million (2015)
- Owner: Edcon
- Parent: Edcon
- Website: cna.co.za

Central News Agency or Consolidated News Agencies, better known simply as CNA, was a South African retail chain of stationery and book stores.

== History ==
Founded in 1896 to sell newspapers in Johannesburg by using newspaper delivery boys on foot and bicycles, CNA initially focused on selling The Star, The Standard and the Diggers News newspapers. A breakthrough for the company came in 1902 when The Argus and the Cape Times newspapers granted a contract to the company to publish all of their newspapers. By 1904, the company had stores across South Africa and continued to expand to meet demand for news during World War I. The company was floated on the Johannesburg Stock Exchange in 1903 to raise £120,000 (equivalent to £129,500,000 in 2017 based on its economic share).

By 1928, the company was publishing most of South Africa's newspapers. Shortly after World War II, the company expanded by opening outlets in Rhodesia (present day Zimbabwe). In 1983, CNA merged with Gallo Africa to form CNA Gallo. The company acquired South African cinema chain Nu Metro in 1990 and proceeded to fully buy it out in 1992. By 1995, the company had 350 stores across South Africa. The company was acquired by Wooltru in 1995 for R500 million.

A difficult retail market for stationery and books in the mid to late 1990s and internal restructuring put the company under financial pressure. This led to it and its remaining 130 outlets being sold to Edcon in 2002 for R130 million.
