= Goygol District =

District in western Azerbaijan

Coordinates: 40°35′N 46°18′E

- District
- Map of Azerbaijan showing Goygol District
- Country: Azerbaijan
- Region: Ganja-Dashkasan
- Established: 8 August 1930
- Capital: Goygol
- Settlements: 45

Government
  - Governor: Vugar Novruzov

Area
  - Total: 920 km^{2} (360 sq mi)

Population (2020)
  - Total: 64,600
  - Density: 70/km^{2} (180/sq mi)
- Time zone: UTC+4 (AZT)
- Postal code: 2500
- Website: goygol-ih.gov.az

Goygol District (Azerbaijani: Göygöl rayonu) is one of the 66 districts of Azerbaijan, situated in the western part of the country within the Ganja-Dashkasan Economic Region. The district is bordered by districts of Goranboy, Kalbajar, Dashkasan, Shamkir, Samukh, and the city of Ganja. Its administrative center and largest city is Goygol, close to the Goygol Lake. Originally established in the early 19th century as "Helenendorf" by German settlers, the area has evolved into a key region for agriculture and tourism in Azerbaijan. As of 2020, Goygol District has a population of approximately 64,600 residents.

== History ==
The modern history of Goygol city began in 1819 when German settlers from Kingdom of Württemberg established a settlement called Helenendorf which became the administrative center of the area. The German influence is evident in the architecture, with houses built in a traditional German style, and the establishment of infrastructure such as schools, kindergartens, and a music school. The current Agrarian Industry Plant in Goygol was initially constructed as a winery by the Fohrer brothers, who were pioneers in wine and cognac production in the region.

During the Soviet era, the administrative center, originally called Helenendorf underwent several name changes reflecting the political climate of the time. In 1930, Narimanov district was established with Helenendorf as its center. In 1938, the district and its center were renamed Khanlar, district and Khanlar city, respectively.

Following Azerbaijan's independence, the region underwent another name change to reflect its Azerbaijani heritage. On April 25, 2008, the district and its administrative center were officially renamed Goygol district and Goygol city, taking their name from the nearby Lake Göygöl, an alpine lake known for its blue waters. This change was formalized by the decision of the Parliament of Azerbaijan on April 25, 2008.

Access to the southern portions of the district remains restricted due to its proximity to the Nagorno-Karabakh region and the armistice line.

== Geography ==
=== Location ===
Executive Power of Goygol district of Azerbaijan

Goygol is located in the western part of Azerbaijan, within the Goygol District, situated in a mountainous and foothill zone. The district lies approximately 364 km kilometers west of the capital city, Baku and 20 kilometers south of Ganja, the second-largest city in Azerbaijan.

The region's highest point reaches an elevation of 3,724 metres above the sea level. Goygol District borders the administrative districts of Samukh to the north, Goranboy to the east, Kalbajar to the south, Dashkasan to the west, Shamkir to the north-west and Ganja city to the north. The total area of the district is 920 square kilometers, with a population of around 63,400 residents. One of the most notable natural features of the region is Lake Goygol, a scenic mountain lake formed as a result of an earthquake in 1139, located at an altitude of approximately 1,500 meters above sea level. The climate in Goygol is temperate, with warm summers and mild winters, supporting agricultural activities such as viticulture and farming.

== Climate ==
Climate data for Goygol (WMO ID:37825, normals for 1955-1991)
Month	Jan	Feb	Mar	Apr	May	Jun	Jul	Aug	Sep	Oct	Nov	Dec	Year
Average precipitation mm (inches)	27.5 (1.08)	35.6 (1.40)	53.7 (2.11)	74.6 (2.94)	105.3 (4.15)	119.5 (4.70)	69.3 (2.73)	45.1 (1.78)	36.1 (1.42)	61.7 (2.43)	39.5 (1.56)	28.5 (1.12)	696.4 (27.42)
Average precipitation days (≥ 0.01 in)	9.4	10	14.4	16.6	18.1	16.1	10.7	9.9	8.5	11.7	9.8	8.5	143.7
Source: NCEI

== Administrative divisions ==
There are 27 administrative territorial units in Goygol district including a city (Goygol city), 5 towns (Khanlar, Gizilgaya, Hajimelik, Ashaghi Zurnabad and Firuzabad) and 39 villages such as Balchili, Gushgara, Chayli, Mollajalilli, and Topalhasanli.

== Culture ==
There are 15 cultural centers, 15 cultural clubs, 41 libraries, 2 music schools (located in Goygol city and Khagani village), and 2 museums: the Heydar Aliyev Museum Center and the History and Ethnography Museum. Additionally, the district features 3 parks, providing spaces for recreation and community events.

Goygol contains several notable historical buildings. Among them are the castle in Zurnabad village dates to the 12th century village, and the sepulcher from the 16th century in Gushgara village. The region also features structures such as the Anaid Temple (16th century), St. Mary Church in Chaykend village, the German Lutheran church (1854-1857) in Goygol city, and Gabriel Church (1674).

== Sport ==
There is Goygol Olympic Sports Complex opened in January 2014, Goygol Central City Stadium and other sporting facilities in Goygol.

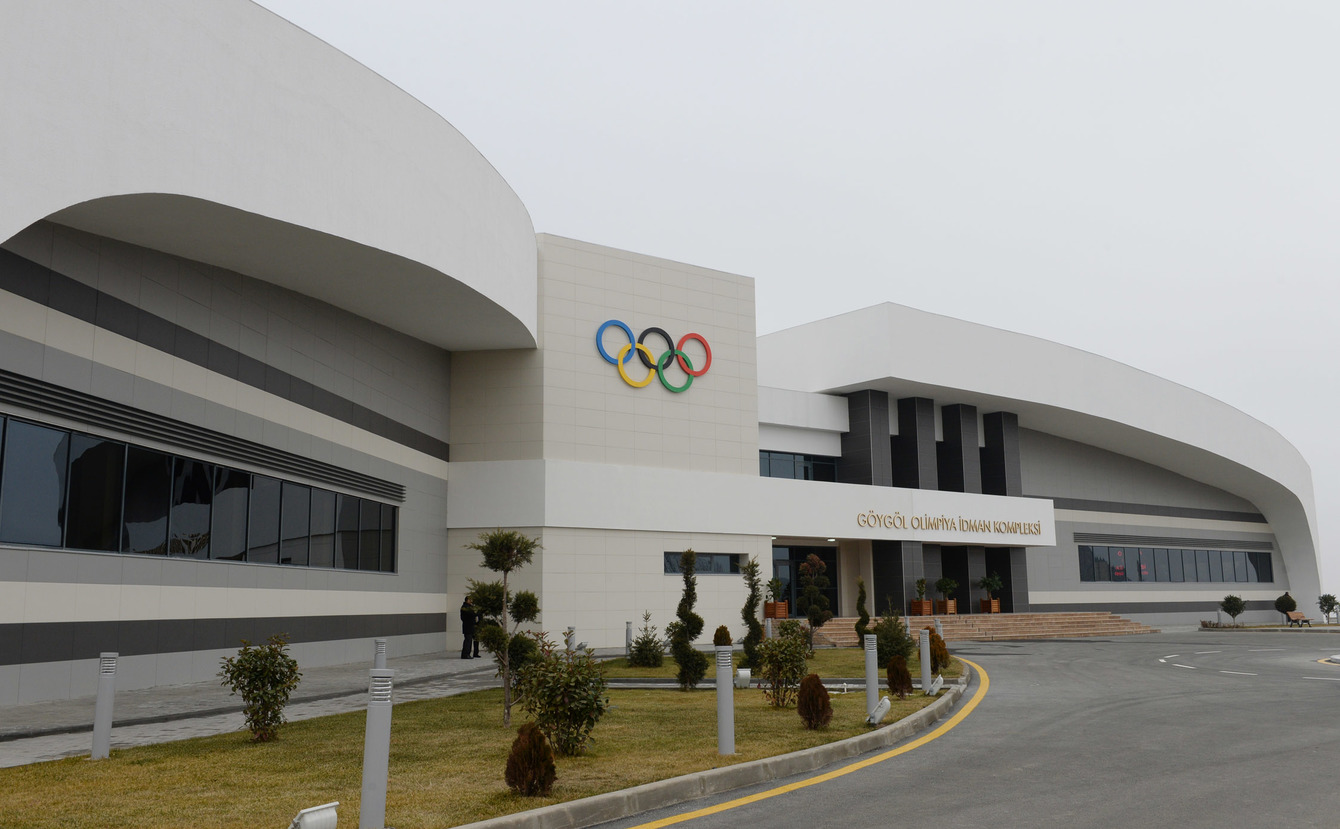
Goygol Olympic Sports Center

== Infrastructure ==
There are 5 bridges in the district: Agh bridge dates to 12th century in Topalhasanli village on Ganjachay river, Birgozlu and Ikigozlu bridges date to the 16th century in Dozular village and in Goygol city on Kurekchay river and Ganjachay river respectively, Uchgozlu bridge dates to 1896 in Uchtepe village on Ganjachay and Stone bridge with two arches on Ganjachay.

== Transport ==
Toghanali–Kalbajar–Istisu highway

== Nature ==
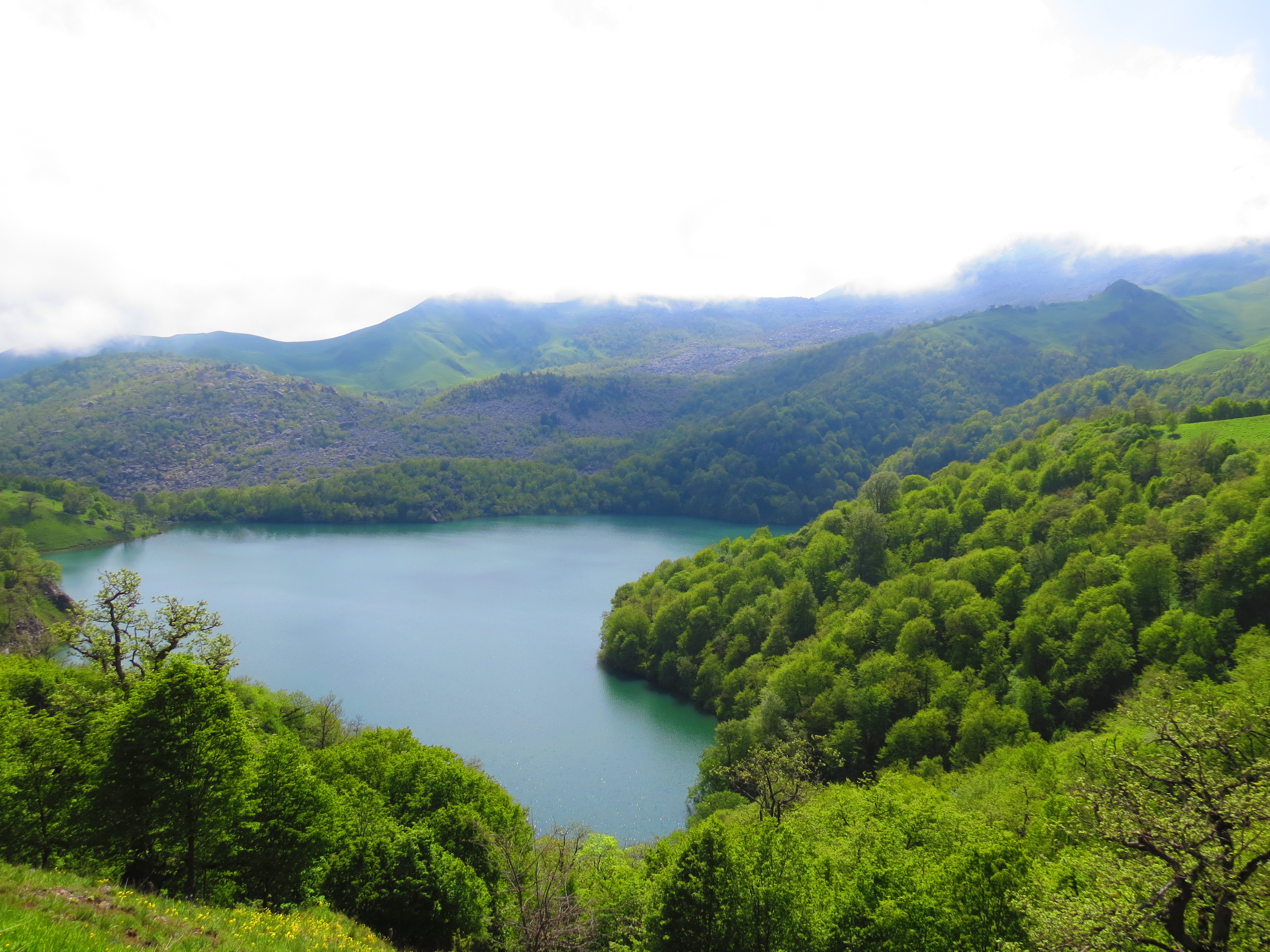
Maralgol

Goygol and 7 identical lakes – Maralgol, Zaligol, Aghgol, Shamligol, Ordekgol, Jeyrangol and Garagol are located in the territory of Goygol district. Lake Goygol is situated on the foothill of Mount Kapaz at an altitude of 1556 meters. The length of the lake is 2450 meters, and its width is 595 meters, the deepest point is 95 meters.

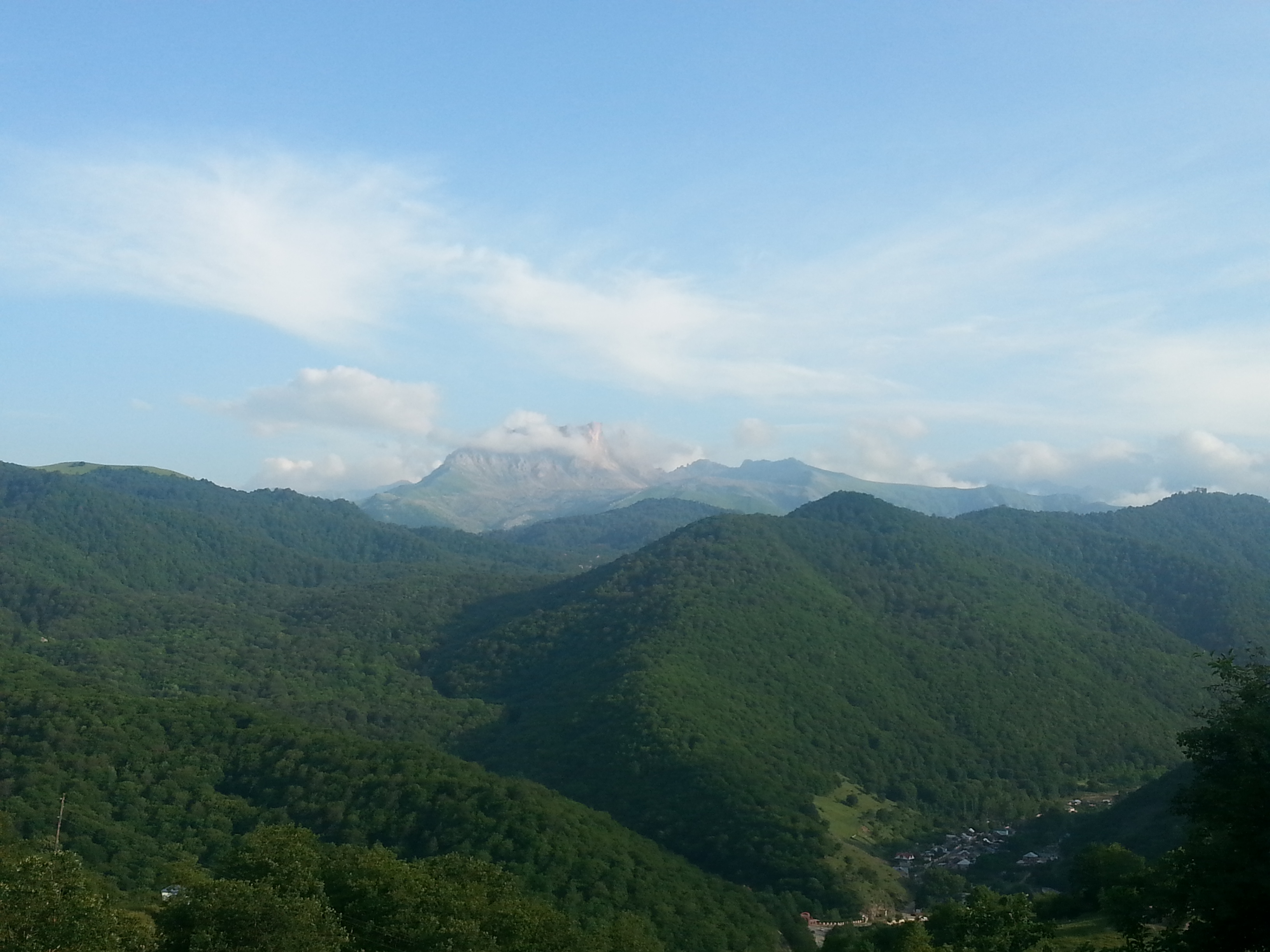
Nature of Goygol district

Maralgol is located 1902 meters above the sea level. It has an area of 23 hectares with the deepest point of 60 meters. The lake is surrounded with sub-alpine grasslands.

The main rivers flowing through the district are Kurekchay, Ganjachay and Goshgarchay. Kurekchay river is the longest with 108 km length. The second longest river is Ganjachay with 98 kilometers length. The rivers are mainly used for irrigation. Water level in the rivers increases during summer.

=== Flora ===
The forests rich with Oriental beech, Caucasian Hornbeam, Caucasian oak and Oriental oak trees cover 17.3% of the territory of the Goygol district. There are separate or mixed forests on various slopes of mountainous areas. Horn-beam in southern slopes, beech, beech-hornbeam in northern slopes, Caucasian and Oriental oaks, also oak-hornbeam in the upper forest zone are in abundance. Pine trees grow on limestone rocks. There are also birches in upper areas of forests and different types of other trees and shrubs such rosa canina, honeysuckles, sorbus, raspberries, crataegus, euonymus, cherry plum in the lower parts of forests.

=== Goygol National Park ===
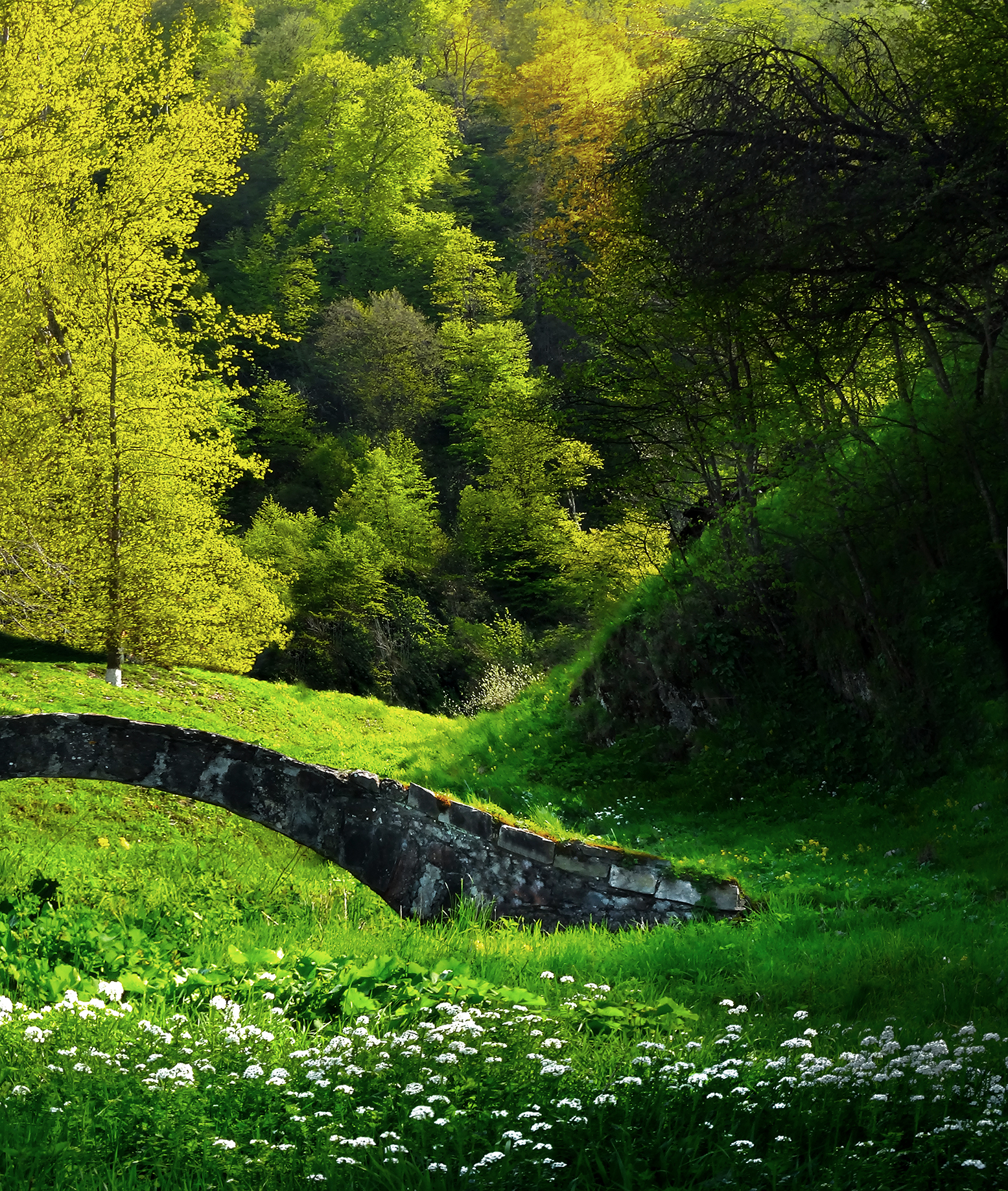
Goygol National Park

Goygol National Park was founded in April 2008 on the base of Goygol State Nature Reserve established in 1925, in the territories of administrative raions of Goygol, Goranboy and Dashkasan.

Goygol National Park is located at an altitude between 1100 and 3065 meters. It has a total of 12755 hectares area including 6739 hectares of Goygol State Reserve, 1577 hectares forests, 3909 hectares of Goygol district, 300 hectares of Dashkasan district and 230 hectares of Goranboy district.

There are 76 types of trees and shrubs in the forest of Goygol National Park including Oriental beech, Oriental oak, Caucasian hornbeam, hook-shaped pines, birchs, maples, cornelian cherry, elderberry, blackberry, rosa canina, common hazel and medlar. The fauna of the National park is diverse with Caucasian deer, roe deer, badger, forest cat, sable, lynx, hare, squirrel, fox, hedgehog, grey partridge and others.

=== Minerals ===
There are pyrites, uranium, marble, limestone, and mineral water in the territory of the Goygol district.
