= François Maeder =

German missionary, artisan, and cartographer

François Thomas Maeder
- Born: 1811 Dornburg-Saale, Germany
- Died: 4 March 1888 (aged 76–77) Colesberg, Northern Cape, South Africa
- Occupation: missionary, artisan, cartographer
- Notable works: Maeder House, Morija Museum & Archives
- Spouse: Clarisse Delatte (m. 1840)

François Thomas Maeder (1811–1888) was a French Protestant missionary and master artisan associated with the Paris Evangelical Missionary Society (PEMS). He was a pivotal figure in the early development of Basutoland (modern-day Lesotho), where he combined religious proselytizing with technical instruction in masonry, architecture, and agriculture.

== Early life and arrival in Africa ==
Maeder was born in Dornburg-Saale in Germany in 1811. He completed technical and drawing classes, first in his native Germany and later in Strasbourg and Alsace (France). He was trained as a master builder and was recruited by the PEMS not as an ordained minister but as a "missionary artisan." This role was essential to the society's goal of establishing permanent, self-sustaining mission stations. He arrived in Southern Africa in 1837, joining the second wave of PEMS missionaries. He was initially sent to assist Thomas Arbousset and Eugene Casalis, who had established the mission at Morija at the invitation of King Moshoeshoe I.

== Missionary work and architectural legacy ==
Maeder is credited with introducing European masonry techniques to the region. He was responsible for the construction of several landmark buildings, including the Morija Mission, where he oversaw the building of the first stone structures and the mission house. He also worked in Beersheba in the Free State which fell under the rule of Moshoeshoe then, with Samuel Rolland helping to develop this station into a major agricultural and educational center. In the 1860s, Maeder was instrumental in founding the Siloe mission station in the Mohale's Hoek district.

As a cartographer, Maeder's maps were among the most accurate of the era, documenting the topography of the Maloti Mountains and the boundaries of Moshoeshoe's kingdom during a period of intense territorial dispute with the Orange Free State. He also made pencil drawings of Moshoeshoe and his subjects, including Josua Nau Makoanyane.

== Personal life ==
In 1840, Maeder married Clarisse Delatte. The Maeder family became a fixture of the missionary community; François was known for his adaptability and his fluency in the Sesotho language, which allowed him to work closely with Basotho converts in vocational training. Maeder was responsible for the translation of Mark and John from the Bible, which was the first to be translated into Sesotho.

== Later years and death ==
Following the disruption of the Seqiti Wars, Maeder continued his work in the southern districts. He eventually retired to the Cape Colony, where he died in Victoria West on 4 February 1888, aged 77. His legacy remains visible in the stone architecture of the Lesotho Evangelical Church in Southern Africa (LECSA) as well as a house called Maeder House, which is now a gallery at Morija Museum and Archives. The house is believed to be the oldest house in Lesotho, built in 1843.
