= Samuel Makoanyane =

Basotho sculptor (1909–1944)

Samuele Makoanyane
- Born: 1909; Tumahole, Parys, Free State, South Africa
- Died: 24 October 1944 (aged 34–35); Koalabata, Teyateyaneng, Lesotho
- Known for: Clay sculpture; Basotho warrior and animal figures

Samuele Makoanyane (1909 – 24 October 1944) was a Mosotho ceramic sculptor known for his finely modeled clay figures depicting animals, musicians, villagers, and historical Basotho warriors. Makoanyane was born in Tumahole, Parys, in the Free State, South Africa, and later lived and worked in Koalabata village near Teyateyaneng in present-day Lesotho. His works are held in major South African museum collections and have been exhibited locally and internationally.

== Early life ==
Makoanyane was born in 1909 in Tumahole township, Parys, in the Free State. He later relocated to Koalabata village near Teyateyaneng in Basutoland (now Lesotho), where he developed his practice as a self-taught clay modeler.

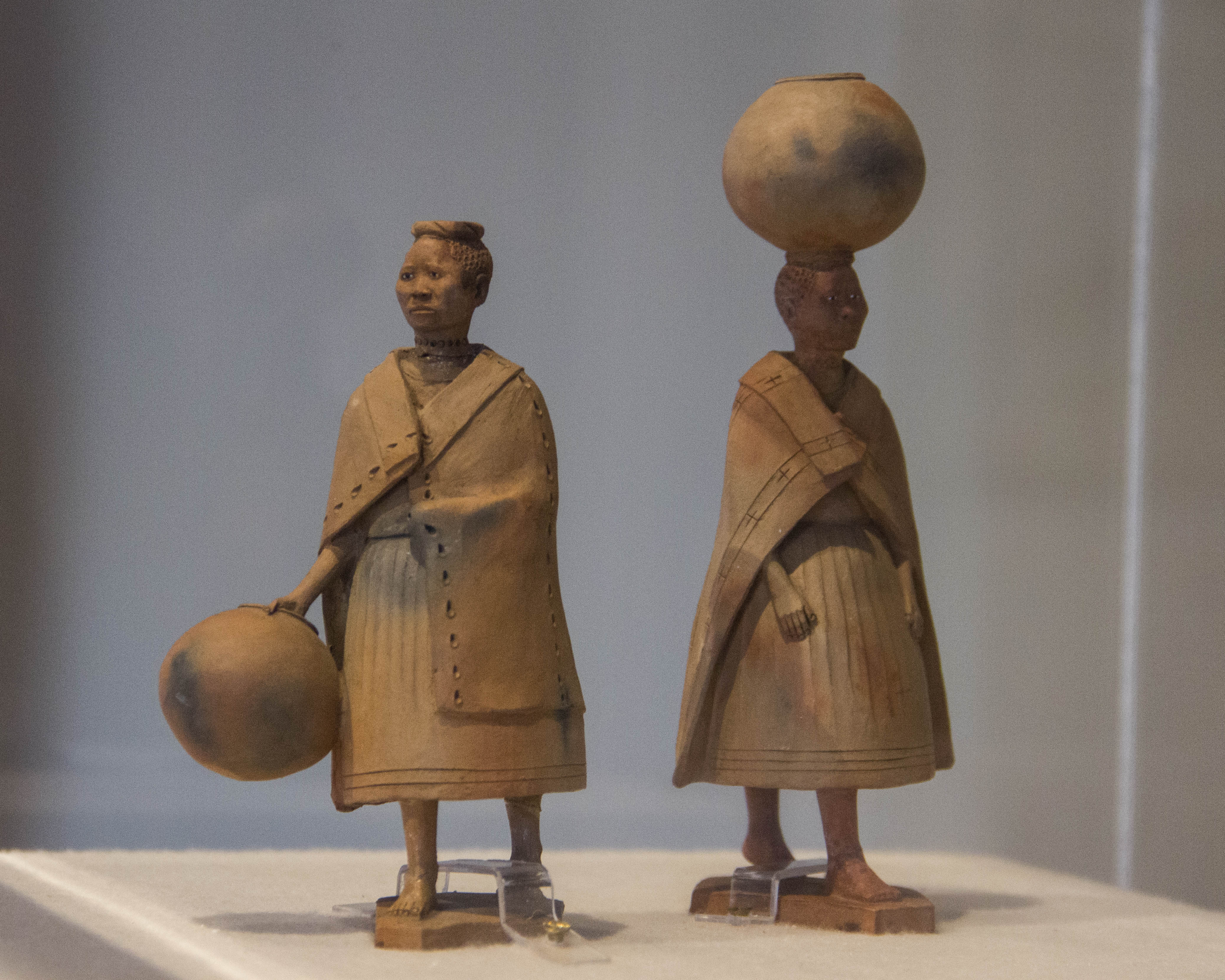
Figurines of women carrying pottery vessels, work by Samuele Makoanyane

He began modelling clay figures inspired by illustrated books before sculpting directly from observation and memory. His work documented Basotho daily life, musical traditions, and military history.

== Artistic work ==
Makoanyane specialized in small ceramic figures, typically between 8 and 18 cm in height. His subjects included domestic and wild animals, Basotho women, villagers doing their daily chores, chiefs, and mounted warriors. Some of his works incorporated additional materials such as feathers, wood, metal, and leather to represent shields, spears, and traditional regalia.

One of his important works is the depiction of his great-grandfather, Josua Nau Makoanyane, who is associated in oral tradition with the army of King Moshoeshoe I.

== Exhibitions ==
During his lifetime, Makoanyane's work was exhibited at:

- 1936 – Empire Exhibition, Johannesburg.
- 1938 – Bantu Arts and Crafts Exhibition, Grahamstown.
- 2021 - KE LIHA PENE - I lay down my pen. Iziko Museum.

His works have also been exhibited at the Iziko Museums of South Africa and have reached audiences in the United States, Paris and the United Kingdom.

== Collections ==
Works by Makoanyane are held in several public collections:

- Iziko Museums of South Africa, including the William Fehr Collection, Cape Town.
- Duggan-Cronin Gallery, Kimberley.
- University of Cape Town (Kirby Collection).
- Morija Museum and Archives, Lesotho.

== Death and legacy ==
Samuel Makoanyane died on 24 October 1944 in Koalabata, Lesotho, from tuberculosis. He was 35 years old at the time of his death.

His clay sculptures are regarded as important visual records of Basotho social life and historical memory in the early twentieth century. Contemporary scholarship increasingly recognizes rrecognizeshis work not merely as ethnographic artifacts but as significant artistic contributions within southern African art history.
