= Mafeteng =

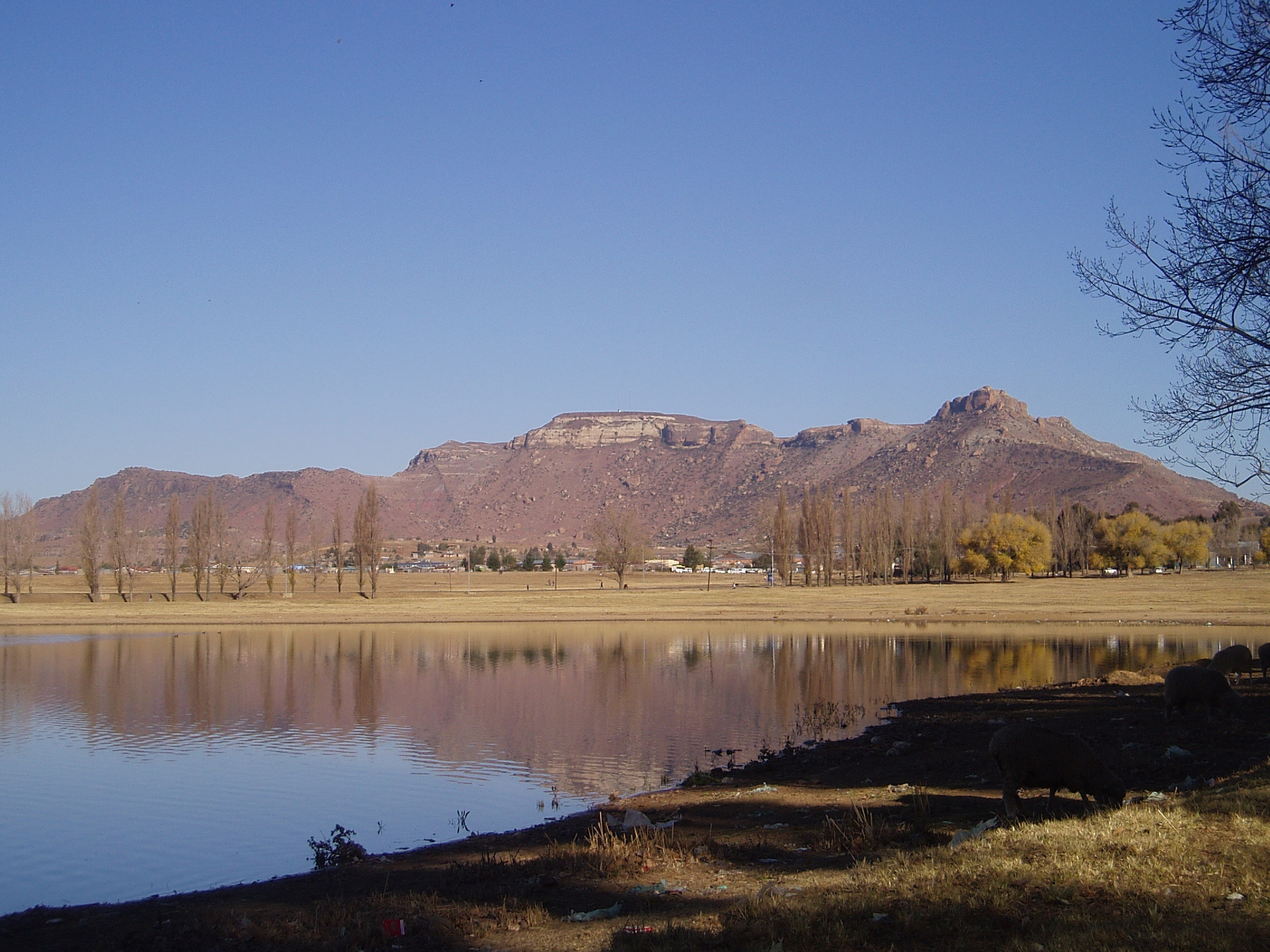
- A view of Likhoele, Mafeteng's second highest mountain, from the reservoir by Kingsgate Primary School

- Location in Lesotho
- Coordinates: 29°49′S 27°15′E
- Country: Lesotho
- District: Mafeteng District
- Constituency: Mafeteng

Population (2016)
  - Total: 39,754
- Time zone: UTC+2 (SAST)

Mafeteng is a city in Lesotho, and the Camptown (capital city) of the district of Mafeteng. It is located about 76 kilometres south of the country's capital, Maseru and has a population of approximately 61,000. The South African border town to Mafeteng is Wepener.

== History ==
The town is said to be named after an early visitor, Emile Roland, who was nicknamed "Lefeta," literally meaning "traveller" or "passer-by." Mafeteng translates to English as "The place of the passers-by."

During the Gun War of 1880/81 a great deal of fighting took place near Mafeteng. The cemetery, located near Mafeteng's Bantu Stadium, contains an obelisk in memory of members of the Cape forces who fell in action in the area.

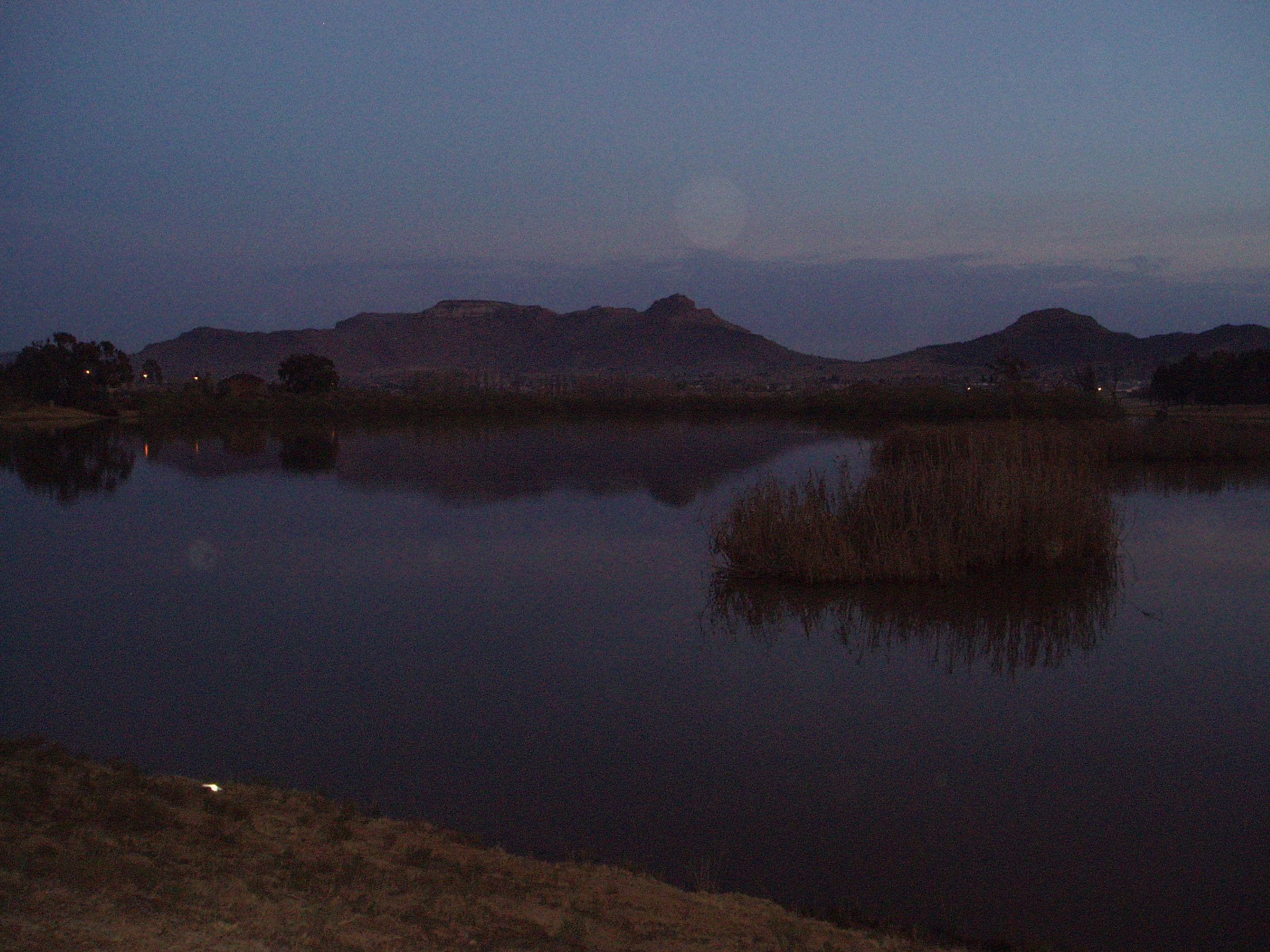
Old Osborne Mill (upper left)

One of the sights in Mafeteng remains the Diphiring Mill, a fully working roller mill established outside the town by Mr. William S. Scott in 1912 and currently operated by the Osborne Family, millers by trade. The whole mill is run off a single engine by an intricate pulley system. Basotho people use the mill to process maize, wheat, millet and other grains.

== Industrialization ==
Mafeteng has several industrial developments including a Gap/Old Navy clothing factory and the Lesotho Pharmaceutical Company (LPC), which also exports to several countries in the region. Mafeteng has two hotels, the Golden Hotel located on the road to Maseru and the Mafeteng Hotel located on Hospital Road. The hotels are the center of the town's limited nightlife: each has a public and a private bar.

== Tourism ==
Mafeteng has little tourism although travelers occasionally stop at the Buy N Take en route to the Van Rooyen's Gate border crossing at Wepener or Malealea Lodge, a tourist destination in Mafeteng District.

== Celebrities ==
The Famo musician Mosotho Chakela was born in Mafeteng in 1963.

== Bantu stadium ==
Mafeteng is home to Bantu Stadium. In the past it has hosted district track and field, volleyball, netball and soccer tournaments. The victorious teams move on to national competitions held in Maseru to represent their district. In 2004, the soccer team from St. Thomas High School progressed through the tournament at Bantu Stadium and secured the national championship. Subsequently, Bantu Stadium had to undergo closure for the renovation of its perimeter fences and spectator areas following the events of 2004.

== Climate ==
Climate data for Mafeteng (1981–2010)
Month	Jan	Feb	Mar	Apr	May	Jun	Jul	Aug	Sep	Oct	Nov	Dec	Year
Mean daily maximum °C (°F)	27.3 (81.1)	26.6 (79.9)	24.5 (76.1)	21.6 (70.9)	17.9 (64.2)	15.0 (59.0)	15.3 (59.5)	17.8 (64.0)	21.9 (71.4)	23.5 (74.3)	25.2 (77.4)	26.8 (80.2)	22.0 (71.5)
Daily mean °C (°F)	20.6 (69.1)	20.2 (68.4)	18.2 (64.8)	15.0 (59.0)	11.2 (52.2)	8.2 (46.8)	8.1 (46.6)	10.5 (50.9)	14.2 (57.6)	16.2 (61.2)	18.1 (64.6)	19.8 (67.6)	15.0 (59.1)
Mean daily minimum °C (°F)	13.9 (57.0)	13.8 (56.8)	11.9 (53.4)	8.4 (47.1)	4.4 (39.9)	1.4 (34.5)	0.9 (33.6)	3.2 (37.8)	6.5 (43.7)	8.9 (48.0)	10.9 (51.6)	12.8 (55.0)	8.1 (46.5)
Average rainfall mm (inches)	123.1 (4.85)	104.4 (4.11)	92.2 (3.63)	49.4 (1.94)	23.8 (0.94)	14.3 (0.56)	5.1 (0.20)	21.0 (0.83)	23.7 (0.93)	58.6 (2.31)	78.6 (3.09)	87.2 (3.43)	681.4 (26.82)
Average rainy days (≥ 0.5 mm)	11	10	10	6	4	3	1	3	3	8	9	10	78
Source: World Meteorological Organization
