= SA Museum =

SA Museum may refer to:

- South Australian Museum, Adelaide
- Iziko South African Museum, Cape Town
