= Music of Lesotho =

Lesotho is a Southern African nation surrounded entirely by South Africa, and mostly populated by Basotho people. The music of Lesotho is made up of a complex mix of cross-cultural musical traditions informed by Bantu migrations, Basotho traditions, and South African and European influences.

== Traditional music and instruments ==
The traditional musical forms and instruments of Lesotho are part of a shared inheritance among Southern African nations. It is not clear whether these instruments were brought to Lesotho via the Bantu Migrations, were created locally by San, Khoi, or other peoples, or is a mix of these sources. For example, musical bows appear to pre-date the arrival of the Bantu peoples, but the instruments became more complex after their arrival.

=== Lesiba ===
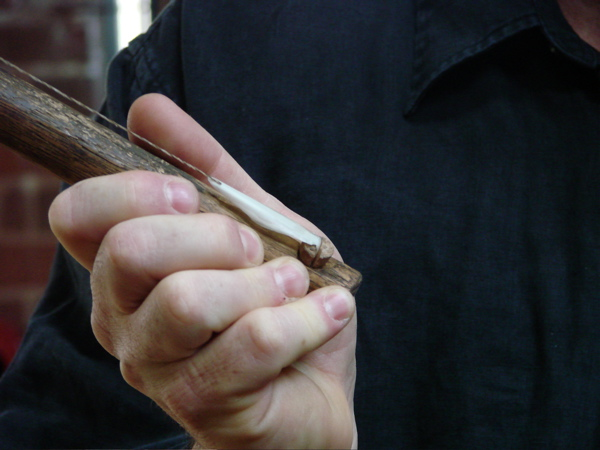
The quill at one end of a lesiba

The lesiba is a type of musical bow that has been referred to as the national instrument of Lesotho by musicologists. It is the most popular of the country's traditional instruments. It has a distinctive sound, and due to its position as a national symbol, it is used in the theme music for national news broadcasts. The origins of the instrument are unclear, but it has been played in southern Africa for at least 400 years.

A short sample of music from a lesiba

The lesiba is an unbraced mouth-resonated bow, which uses a quill as its vibration source to vibrate its single string. The instrument is approximately 1 metre (3 ft 3 in) long. The neck can be made from wood or metal, and wire or sinew can be used for the string. Sounds are generated by strong breathing across the quill, with the air speed over the quill affecting the frequency of the string's vibration. The lesiba was traditionally used by herdsmen, and individual playing styles may have functioned as identification signals to their cattle, as well as soothing melodies for human listeners. Despite its recognition as a distinctly Basotho instrument, its music and musicians feature little within Lesotho's music industry.

=== Other traditional instruments ===
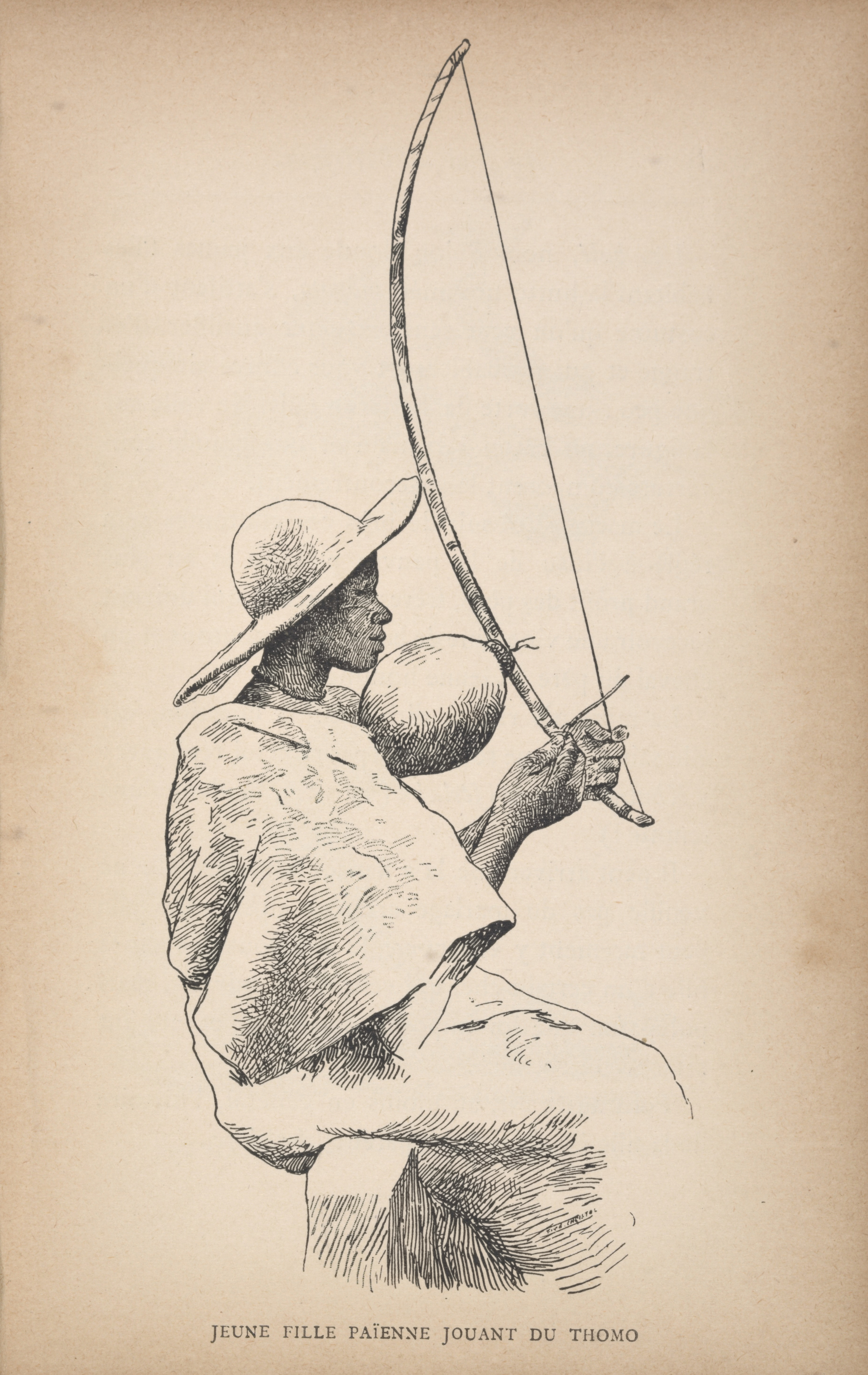
A young woman playing the thomo

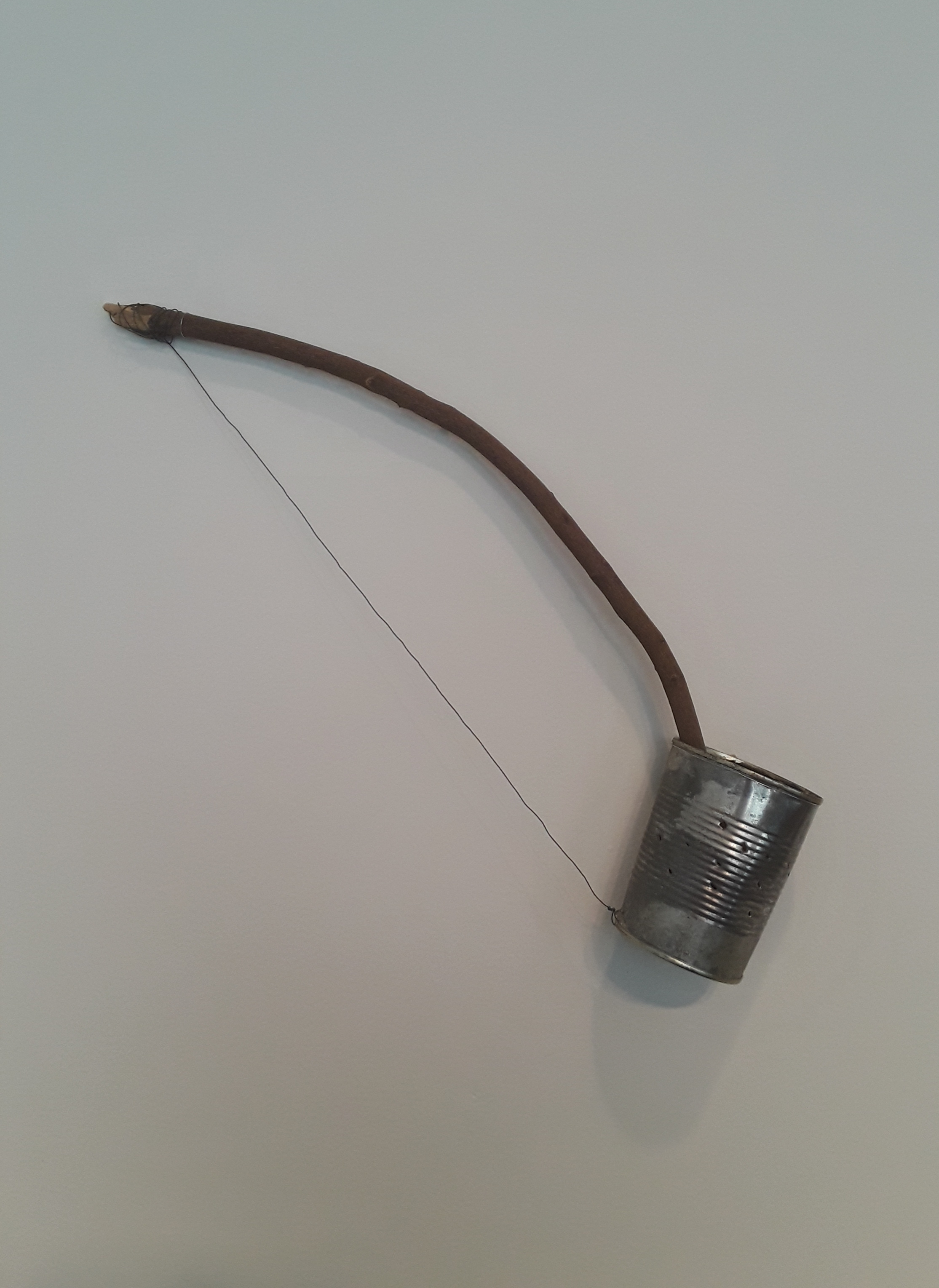
A mamokhorong

The thomo is a gourd-resonated single-string bow that is traditionally played by young women. The addition of a resonating chamber to the bow improves the quality of the sound. The instrument is usually played with the gourd resting on the player's chest, and may be played with or without vocal accompaniment. It is rarely played today, and the word thomo is now often used to mean 'piano'.

The setolo-tolo is similar to the thomo; but instead of a gourd, the resonant chamber is the player's mouth. It consists of a core bamboo or wooden cylinder, on which the mouth is placed, with rods coming out of both ends, connected by the bowstring. The musician plucks the string with one hand while holding the core cylinder with the mouth and the other hand. The thomo is played by male musicians.

Other traditional instruments include the lekolilo, a type of flute; the lekope, a simple bow instrument that was used as a training tool for the thomo; and the sekebeku, a jaw-harp.

== 20th century musical inventions ==
Two instruments emerged in Basotho music during the 20th century—the koriana and the 'mamokhorong.

=== Koriana ===
Beginning in the 1920s, the koriana (a Sotho language loanword for accordion or concertina) became a popular musical instrument in Lesotho. Though it is only a century old, it is viewed as a traditional musical style in part because the lyrics are in Sotho. The koriana is often accompanied by a drum to form a small band.

Koriana music evolved as form of entertainment in small unlicensed bars (shebeens) in the slums of northeastern South Africa, and intermingled with other African urban music styles in a mix of styles collectively known as marabi. Within Lesotho, koriana-based marabi music would form the foundation of famo music (see below).

Koriana musicians developed a reputation as wanderers. Successful musicians starting out by playing in local bars, and would begin to get invited to play at special occasions, such as weddings or ceremonies, often quite far from home. It has developed into a Sotho saying:

Ngoana oa hao ha u sa mo rate u mo rekele koriana a tle a tsekele a e’o shoella moo u sa tsebeng

If you do not love your child, buy him an accordion so that he can wander and disappear into thin air.

=== 'Mamokhorong ===
The 'mamokhorong (or sekhankula) is a recent invention that has also become popular. It appears to date from the 1930s, around the same time as the koriana. It is a long string instrument that is played sitting down. It consists of a curved rod of wood or metal attached to a tin can or similar resonator. A wire is stretched from the end of the resonator to the far end of the rod. Music is produced by running a bow across the wire, similar to playing a violin. It may be played with or without vocal accompaniment, and 'mamokhorong music often follows a circular structure.

== Popular music ==
Most frequently heard on the radio are various sub-Saharan AfroPop styles, Sotho Hip-hop, RnB, Deep house, Soulful House, Dancehall, Jazz, kwaito, and reggae.

=== Famo ===
Famo music, an outgrowth of koriana music, holds the most prominent place in the contemporary music scene in Lesotho. The term famo comes from the phrase ho re famo, meaning "to flare one's nostrils", reflecting its active, competitive nature.

As famo gained popularity, it also became entwined with gangs. Control and protection rackets for Basotho labourers in (often illegal) South African mines (zama zama) inhabited the same mining towns as famo music. Over time, the musicians themselves fell into factions, competing for fans and airplay. Two prominent famo performers, Chakela and Lekase, formed rival factions: Terene and Seakhi, respectively. Differences between the factions eventually rose to the level of politics, with Terene supporting the government and Seakhi supporting the opposition party in the late 2010s. In recent years, the groups have splintered into dozens of groups, including internal battles within the Terene faction. In 2024, Lesotho's government banned some famo groups as "terrorists" due to ongoing violence.

=== Gospel music ===
Vocal choirs, which sing church music in Sesotho, are also popular. They range from traditional a capella choirs to groups that mix gospel music with famo, jazz, hip-hop and other influences.

=== South African influence ===
Lesotho's geographic position as an enclave of South Africa leads South African musicians to have a large following in Lesotho. Johannesburg in particular plays an outsized role in Lesotho's music scene. For example, Johannesburg's pubs (shebeens) served as incubators for koriana music. Lesotho's musicians also often travel to South Africa to record their albums and distribute their music, as there are more resources available there. However, in the late apartheid era, South African artists had used Lesotho as a "safe haven" for their concerts.

Despite the popularity of music within the country, Basotho musicians have rarely been able to make significant money from their music. Lesotho's "Queen of Famo", Puseletso Seema, for instance, has seen little financial gain from her music. The Lesotho government implemented a system in 2024 charging businesses for using music for commercial purposes and distributing that money to the artists.

== Music festival ==
The Morija Arts & Cultural Festival is a prominent Sotho music festival, held annually, which highlights the dance and music of the Basotho people.

== National anthem ==
The national anthem of Lesotho is "Lesotho fatše la bo-ntat'a rona". The lyrics were written by missionaries François Coillard and Adolphe Mabille, using music from Ferdinand Samuel Laur, composed in the 1820s. It was officially adopted as the national anthem in 1967.

== Selected Basotho musicians ==
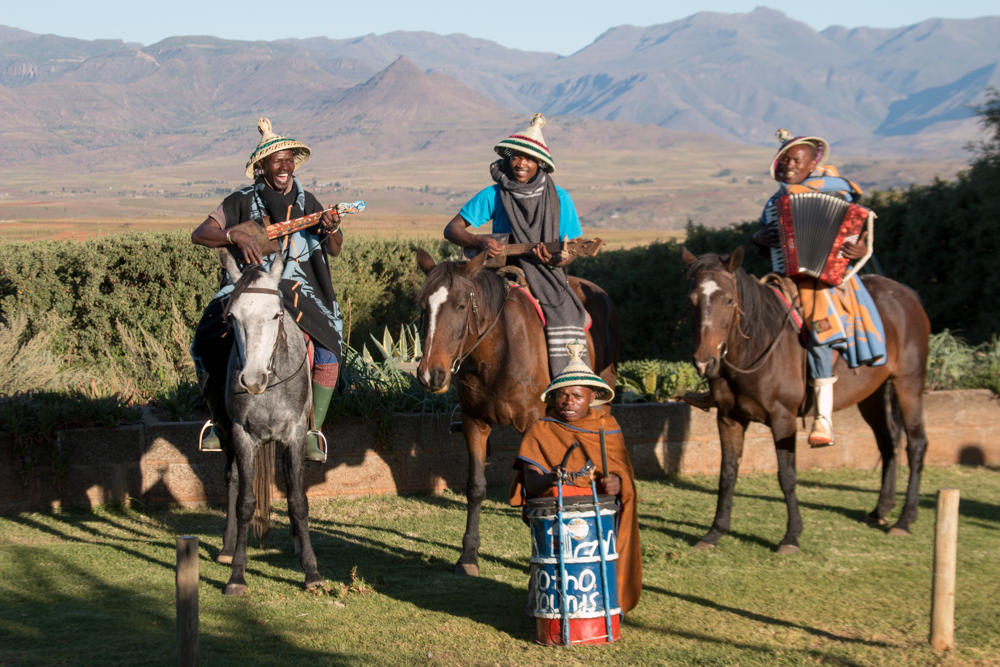
Sotho Sounds, playing koriana (at right), with drums and homemade instruments

- Mosotho Chakela
- Joshua Pulumo Mohapeloa
- Puseletso Seema
- Senyaka (rapper)
- Sotho Sounds
- Tsepo Tshola + Sankomota

== See also ==
- Morija Arts & Cultural Festival
- Lesotho Culture
