= Morija Arts & Cultural Festival =

Annual event held in Morija, Lesotho

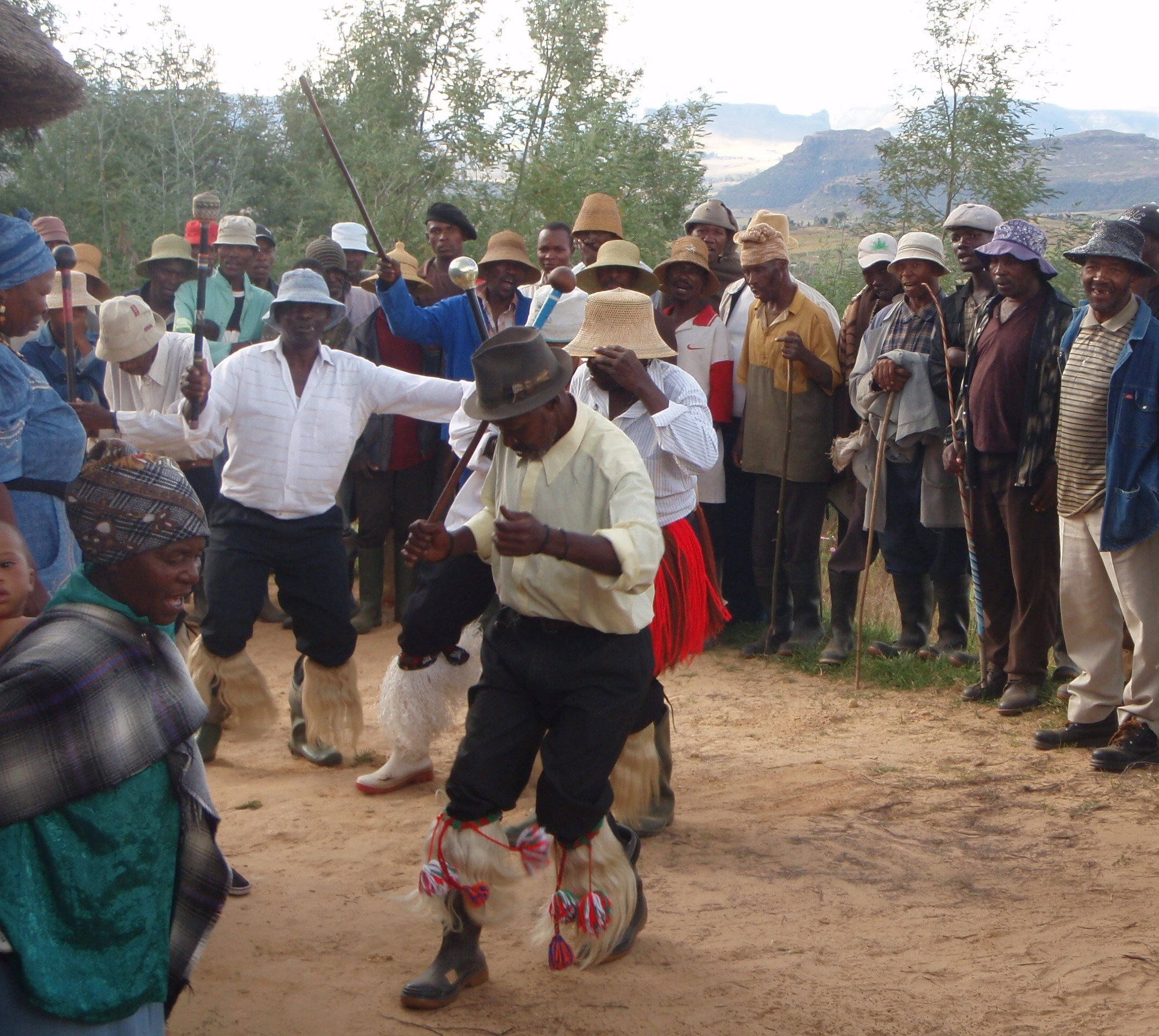
Basotho men in a village near Nthabiseng, Lesotho dancing a traditional Men's Stick Dance

Morija Arts & Cultural Festival, also known as Morija Festival, is an annual event held in Morija, a large village in the Maseru District of Lesotho. This hugely successful event is coordinated by the Morija Museum & Archives, with support from many groups including, the Royal Family and the Government of Lesotho.

== About the Festival ==
- The theme of the Morija Festival is "Kaofela re chabana sa khomo" (Unity in Diversity).
- The festival began in 1999, bringing together people of varying views and backgrounds, to celebrate the diverse cultural heritage of Lesotho. It is an opportunity for Basotho, of all ages and backgrounds, to demonstrate the richness of their culture and, at the same time, to experience the culture of neighbours and other residents of Lesotho.
- From 1999 until 2006 the festival was held over 5 days in the beginning of October. Recently it has been divided into two components (to prevent serious overlap with other major events in the region, which were hurting attendance figures).
- The first component is the Morija Festival Cultural Competition. This component is a medium-sized event held in October, and includes various competitions for drama, poetry, and traditional dance. These competitions are the culmination of area and district competitions for schools across the whole of Lesotho. It features competitions for Primary and High Schools, as well as Adults and Community Cultural Groups.
- The second component is the Morija Arts & Cultural Festival, a larger event held over a week in an April. This event has 3 main days, which feature artistic and performing groups, a large range of events and night concerts, as well as many stalls and exhibits.
- A major draw of the Morija Festival is the live musical performances. It is a rare opportunity to hear local jazz, vocal choirs, traditional music, and Famo all in one place.

== Musicians & Artists ==
A small selection of musicians and artists who have been featured at the festival.

=== Musicians ===
- Bhudaza (Lesotho jazz musician)
- Mosotho Chakela
- Famole
- Mantsha
- Matsie

=== Artists ===
- Mabeoana Quilters (Basotho quilting group)
- Matsie Sefali
- Lephoi "Mantsa" Mohale
- Mosotho Chakela
- Kholumo Maphathe
- Teboho "Famole" Lesieea
- Mahlanya

== See also ==
- Music of Lesotho
- Morija Museum & Archives
