= Boshofpoort =

18th-century Cape farm entrance in South Africa

Boshofpoort is one of the best-preserved Cape farm entrances from the 18th century. It is located in Newlands where Boshof Avenue meets Paradise Road (the M3). It has an elevation of 1321 metres.

== History ==
In 1666, the miller and mason Wouter Mostert was granted a farm known as Goed-en-Quaad on the Liesbeek River. At the end of the 17th century, it was owned by the chief surgeon, Willem ten Damme. He also owned the adjoining Boshof farm. In 1786, Alexander van Breda became owner, and the entire farm complex was renamed Boshof. Van Breda probably built the gate at his house's entryway. The subdivision of Boshof was founded in 1905 with the layout of the Fernglen neighborhood on the eastern side of Kirstenbosch National Botanical Garden.

== Gate ==
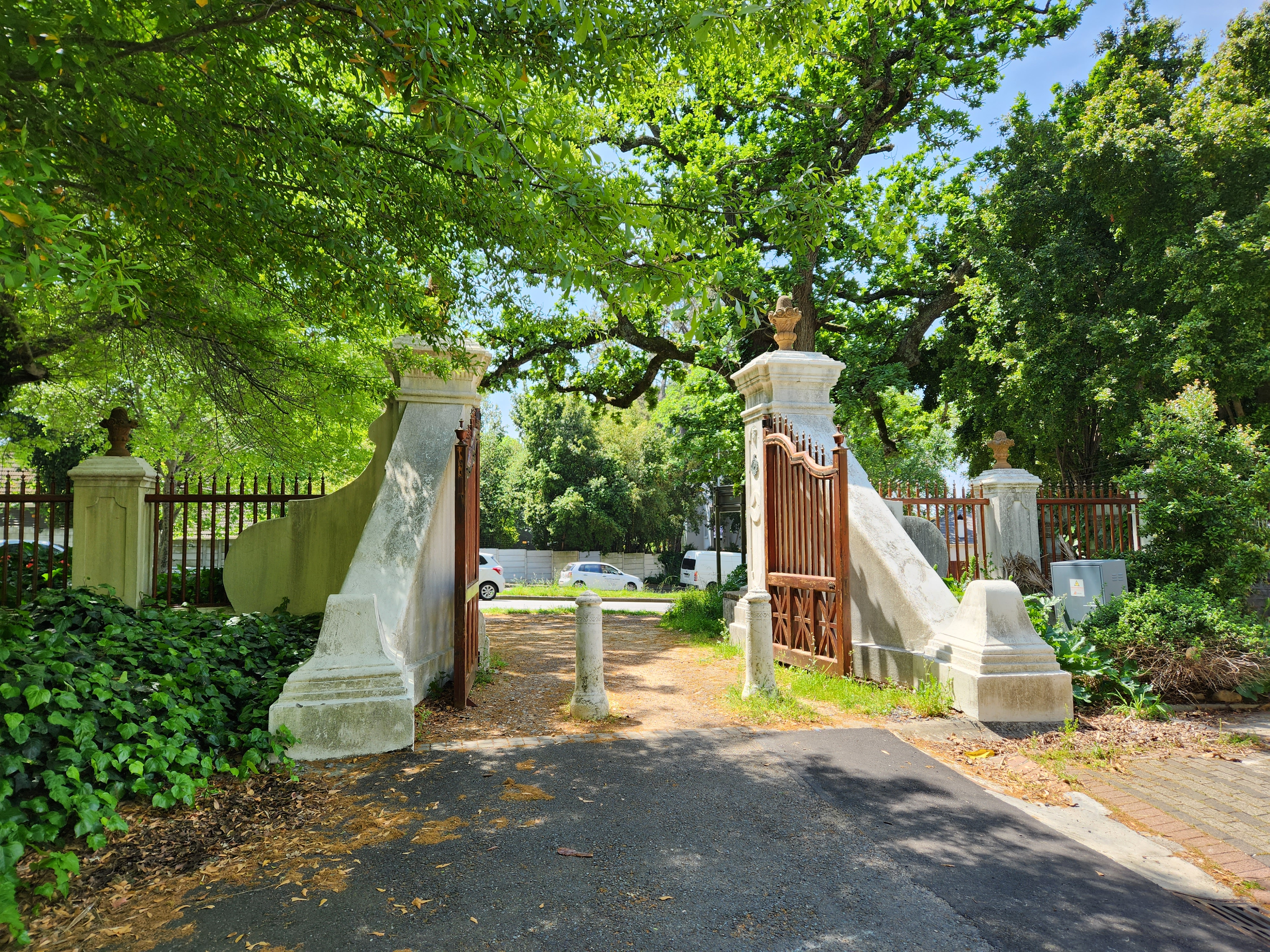
The Boshof gateway, facing towards the north, in 2024

The gate was built in the then fashionable neo-Classical style with graceful and impressive posts. On both sides of the gate are wide seams with pillars. This gate leads to one of the oldest oaks in the Cape and is owned by the City of Cape Town.

== Monument ==
After the municipal government restored it in 1940, it was declared a national monument in 1941. Today, it is a provincial heritage site.

== Painting ==
In the William Fehr collection, housed in the Castle of Good Hope, is a painting of the gate.
