= Slave Lodge, Cape Town =

South African social history museum

Slave Lodge
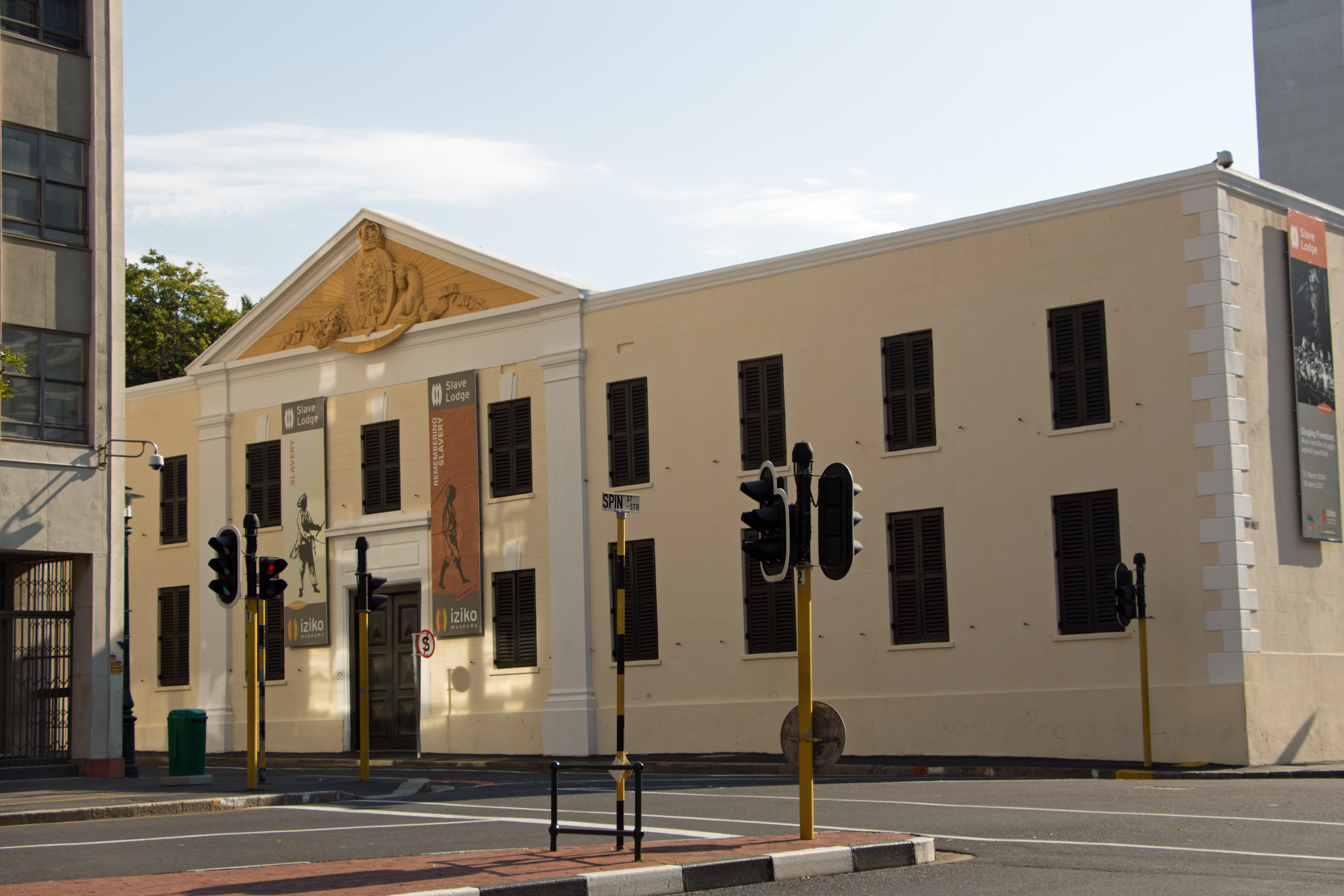
- Slave Lodge, Cape Town

- Location within Cape Town
- Coordinates: 33.92506°S 18.420393°E
- Type: Cultural history
- Website: www.iziko.org.za/museums/slave-lodge

The Slave Lodge is one of the oldest buildings in Cape Town, South Africa, with a history spanning more than three centuries. The building has served various purposes over the years, transitioning from its original role as a slave lodge to housing government offices, the Old Supreme Court, and eventually becoming the South African Cultural History Museum. Today, it is part of the Iziko Museums of South Africa.

== History ==
=== Slave Lodge (1679 – 1811) ===
The Slave Lodge was built in 1679 by the Dutch East India Company (VOC) to house enslaved people brought to the Cape Colony to work for the company. The structure initially accommodated up to 500 enslaved individuals, who lived in overcrowded conditions. The lodge was designed as a secure and enclosed building.

The enslaved individuals housed in the lodge came from regions including East Africa, Madagascar, India, and Southeast Asia. They worked in agriculture, construction, and domestic service.

In 1795, the British captured the Cape Colony for the first time, returning it briefly to the Dutch in 1803 under the Batavian Republic. British control resumed in 1806 following the Battle of Blaauwberg. In 1811, under British administration, the building ceased to function as a slave lodge.

=== Government Offices Building (1811 – 1911) ===
After its use as a slave lodge ended, the building was repurposed to house various government offices. Modifications were made to the structure to accommodate its administrative functions.

During this period, it served as the seat of colonial administration. In 1854, the first Cape Parliament was established, marking a significant political milestone in the colony's governance.

=== Old Supreme Court (1911 – 1960s) ===
In 1911, the building was repurposed as the Old Supreme Court. Architectural modifications were made to create courtrooms and judicial chambers. This role continued through significant legal and political developments, including the rise of segregationist laws in the early 20th century.

The court functioned at this location until the construction of new judicial facilities in the 1960s.

=== South African Cultural History Museum (1960s – 1998) ===
In 1966, the building underwent restoration and was designated as the South African Cultural History Museum. The museum opened to the public in 1967. It houses cultural artifacts and historical displays related to the history of the region, including exhibits on slavery and broader themes in cultural history.

=== Slave Lodge Museum (1998 – Present) ===
In 1998, the museum was renamed the Slave Lodge Museum and became part of the Iziko Museums of South Africa, which manage several key heritage sites in the Western Cape.

== See also ==
- List of museums in South Africa
- Slavery in South Africa
