= Rust en Vreugd =

Building in Cape Town

Coordinates: 33.9304°S 18.4205°E

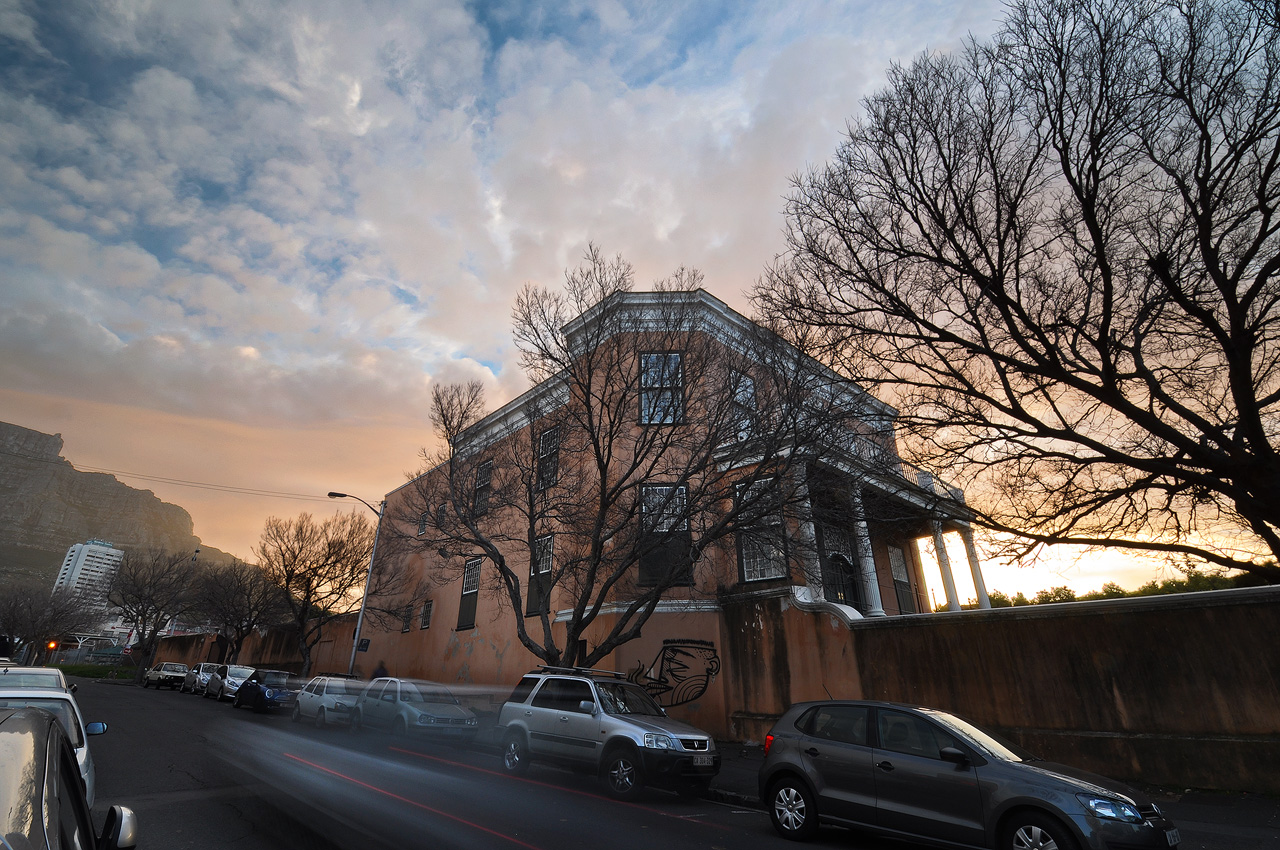
Rust en Vreugd as seen from 78 Buitenkant Street

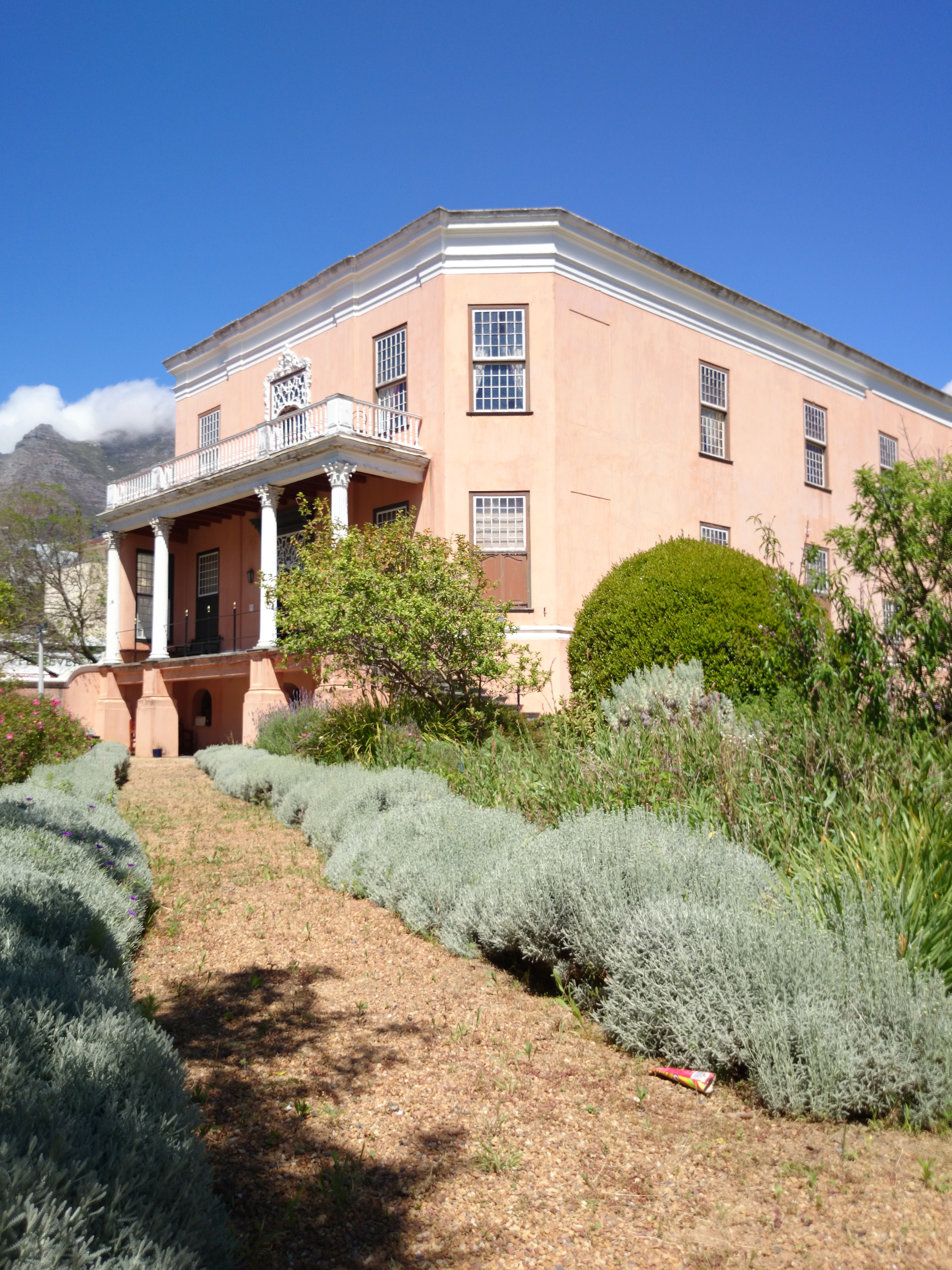
Rust en Vreugd

Rust en Vreugd (meaning Rest and Joy), is a historic house and garden, located on Buitekant Street at the edge of the central business district of Cape Town, South Africa. It is one of the few remaining 18th-century buildings in the city. The Rust en Vreugd is home to the William Fehr Collection of pictorial Africana. It is a part of the Iziko Museums.

== History ==
The Rust en Vreudg house was built as a residence for Williem Cornelis Boers of the Dutch East India Company (VOC) in 1778. A rococo fanlight at the entrance of the house has been ascribed to sculptor Anton Anreith.

=== The house ===
Until the end of the 19th century, the house was part of a spacious estate. Boers owned the property from 1777 to 1782. The two-story, flat-roof blueprint was typical of 18th-century village houses. The facade is marked by a porch, balcony, and four Corinthian columns. Louis Thibault designed the main facade, Anreith was responsible for most of the porch itself, and the front door was built by Hermann Schutte. The pillars, front door, balcony door, and the kiaat fanlight were all the work of Anreith, as were the wood carvings. Two lounges, a dining room, a pantry, a kitchen, and bedrooms lie on the first floor, along with a courtyard out back. On the second lay another lounge, more bedrooms, a bathroom, storerooms, and a balcony.

=== The gates ===
The original gates date to 1778. The current wrought iron gates were purchased from a congregation in Penkridge, Staffordshire, England, in 1878.

=== The owners ===
The attorney W.C. Boers was the Fiscal of the Cape, but he was guilty of so much corruption and abuse of power that he was recalled to the Netherlands at the request of the local population. In 1782, Olof de Wet, also an official with the VOC, purchased it, only to sell it in 1785 to Jean Martin, a French doctor. In 1798, the widow of Johannes Blösser bought the property, later taken over by R.J. van der Riet, a member of the Political Council. Between 1814 and 1826, it was the residence of Governor of the Cape Colony, Lord Charles Somerset. Later, it would be owned by William Hopper and his son. The Hoppers renamed the house The Grove. In 1860, the home and garden were opened to the public as the Rustenburg Gardens. Starting in July 1885, a teachers' college (Normal School of Cape Town, a forerunner of the South African College and therefore of the University of Cape Town), a state guesthouse, a grade school, and a nursing school were among the uses of the area. Over time, urban sprawl shrank the gardens, and the building deteriorated until the Cape Provincial Administration restored it and the William Fehr Collection was opened there.

== Bibliography ==
- Green, Eldred. "Rust en Vreugd and its pictures." Lantern, April 1979, Year 28, No. 2.
