= Morija =

- Town
- Location within Lesotho
- Coordinates: 29°37′47.0″S 27°30′48.0″E
- Country: Lesotho
- District: Maseru District
- Elevation: 5,456 ft (1,663 m)
- Time zone: UTC+2 (CAT)

Morija is a town in western Lesotho, located 35 kilometres south of the capital, Maseru. Morija is one of Lesotho's most important historical and cultural sites, known as the Selibeng sa Thuto— the Well-Spring of Learning. It was the site of the first French Protestant mission in Lesotho, founded in 1833 e.g Thomas Arbouset. The town also houses the Morija Museum and Archives, well known for supporting research and preserving valuable records and documents of Lesotho's history. There is also a college of nursing among the schools within the premises. The centre is home for the Lesotho Evangelical Church in Southern Africa.

The town hosts the football team Lijabatho, who won the 2025–26 Lesotho Premier League.

== See also ==
- Morija Arts & Cultural Festival
- Morija Museum & Archives
