= Puseletso Seema =

Basotho singer

Puseletso Seema (born 1949 in Johannesburg) is a musician and performer of the Famo musical tradition in Lesotho. She has been acclaimed as the Queen of Famo, breaking in as a rare female voice in a male-dominated music genre.

== Life ==
=== Early life ===
Puseletso Seema was born in 1949 in Seteketekeng, a neighborhood of Johannesburg whose name translates as "place of [drunken] staggering". She grew up in urban Soweto (South Africa) and rural Lesotho. Her mother was a servant and she was brought up by her aunt who made her tend to their cattle. A self-trained singer, she began to compose her songs while minding the cows, around age 12. Social convention looked down on women singers and she received no family support.

At age 15, she was raped by her then-boyfriend. This further strained her relationship with her family, who blamed it on her "promiscuous" singing. She eloped with a miner in the mid-1960s and settled in Mahobong, Lesotho. She had three children, two of whom died in infancy. When her husband died in 1970, she was kicked out by her in-laws and returned to New Claire. Facing renewed hostility from her natal family, she started working as a food and drinks vendor at the local mines and joined a criminal gang. During this period, she continued to write songs and performing with a troupe Tau ea Linare.

=== Touring musician ===
Puseletso Seema performed her music at the mines, and excelled at dance where she wielded a fighting stick. She specialised in the accordion, the main instrument of the Famo, and earned most of her livelihood from live performances in mining camps. She began to travel around the Transvaal and the Orange Free State, where bosses of camp gangs vied for her attention and often kidnapped her to perform for them.

In 1980, Seema and her band recorded an album in Johannesburg. Her song in memory of a dead brother became a hit, and she gained entry into the otherwise male-dominated Famo scene. She never made much money despite her acclaim; she tells a story that during the 1980s, she confronted her producer, demanding her royalties, only to be given eighteen cents.

== Musical themes and living conditions ==
Puseletso Seema released more than 30 albums. Her songs were scripted from her life experiences, her marriages and their failure. Meanwhile, Famo itself has become a cause of criminal strife in Lesotho, with rival gangs gunning down performers, and the previously gentle lyrics becoming increasingly violent. She has maintained her neutrality in these famo wars, rejecting the violence and insults, saying "I don't like music that is vulgar or insulting or insinuating any hate."

Puseletso Seema was robbed several times of her possessions, including the traditional accordion that is emblematic of the music. She also has a long-standing quarrel with the musical industry who, she claimed, cheated her and her fellow performers out of their prize winnings and royalties. Her hit song Mofata Seliba inveighed against people who enriched themselves from her talent. In 2020, she wrote a song on the theme of Covid-19 sponsored by the Lesotho National Coronavirus Secretariat, but once again she said she wasn't paid for her work.

Puseletso Seema's performances tended to be live with minimal staging, featuring extended solos and themes. Performing on television, however, forced her and other Famo musicians to shorten their solos, and each song became more focused on one theme, rather than the amalgamation of thoughts familiar from live productions.

== In popular culture ==
Zakes Mda's novel Wayfarers' Hymns features Puseletso Seema.
