= Basuto War =

The Basuto War may refer to any of three conflicts in Basutoland:

- The Eighth Xhosa War (1850-1853)
- The Free State–Basotho Wars (1858-1868)
- The Basuto Gun War (1880-1881)
