= Famo =

Genre of music from Lesotho

Famo Famo started as a rural music among Lesotho's shepherds, but migrated to the urban areas along with the Basotho who went to work in South Africa's mines in the 20th century. "It was there where they were introduced to an accordion," says Mpho Malikeng, a Maseru musician and artist who is an expert on famo.

== Characteristics ==
As a very popular form of music in Lesotho, famo consists of male or female singing and ululations. Instrumental support comes from an accordion, a drum and a bass. Songs often refer to urban life, and female singers can use their singing to challenge their male counterparts.

== History ==
The introduction of Basotho migrant labour from Lesotho into South African mines in the 1920s led to the development of famo. It originated in the setolotolo bow songs that the menfolk would sing as they walked along, alternating between the bow to fill in the chorus and the voice as the lead part. With the introduction of European instruments, the korosetina (concertina) and koriana (accordion) were adopted. The concertina was initially favoured as it could be played whilst singing and was easily carried but the accordion was eventually favoured for its bigger sound which was better for dancing.

The music and singing combination of famo was performed in the shebeens where the workers drank and chatted and also down in the mines whilst they toiled. The name famo came from the phrase ho re famo, to flare the nostrils or to throw up one's garments. The dancing girls who had followed the men to South Africa and entertained them in the shebeens perfected a dance with their short skirts that allowed them to artfully flick up the skirt, exposing their naked rear. The performers were careful not to wear underwear.

In 1963 reforms to South African regulations meant the repatriation of thousands of women and famo performers and shebeen danceers were forced back to Lesotho. This encouraged the creation of ensembles that were rounded out by a drummer. The moropa drum they used was a 20-litre tar can topped by a piece of inner tube as the drumhead, with manyenenyene, metal bottle tops or jangles, to provide a jingling alternative to the thump of the drum. The drumsticks themselves were made from slices of tire.

Since the 1920s music companies had been looking for African music they could commercialise. What turned the music of the shebeens into a national music for the Basotho was the rise of major recording personalities amongst the famo ensembles.

== Artists ==
In the late 1960s the first major recording artists to make a living from famo were Tau ea Matšekha (Lion of Matšekha, Matšekheng/Habo Matšekha is an area in Northern Lesotho) made up of Forere Motloheloa (accordionist) and Apollo Ntabanyane (vocalist/composer). The pair met and honed their musical act in the mines and shebeens but their success with albums such as Peete Kea Falla (Peete's Place I'm Quitting) released by EMI led Ntabanyane to leave and set up his own group. In 1974 he even declared himself "King of Famo" at a concert at Maseru's Airport Hotel that was attended by Her Majesty 'MaMohato, wife of Lesotho's King Moshoeshoe II. Later successful artists include David Sello Motaung's Tau ea Linare in the 1980s and southern Lesotho's Mahosana Akaphamong. It was hard for many to give up their normal jobs and make a living from famo performances and records, but some shebeens would offer paid competitions for female singers, the most renowned being Puseletso Seema, a veteran with 40 years of performance experience.

Mosotho Chakela is a current star in famo music, having performed at the Macufe Mangaung African Cultural Festival and Morija Arts & Cultural Festival. In 2006 Chakela was awarded a South African Traditional Music Award for best musician in the famo music category.
