= Iziko Museums of South Africa =

Museum complex in Cape Town

- Established: 1998
- Location: Cape Town, South Africa
- Coordinates: 33°55′44″S 18°24′54″E
- Website: www.iziko.org.za

Iziko Museums of South Africa, formerly Southern Flagship Institution (SFI) and then Iziko Museums of Cape Town, is an organisation governing national museums in greater Cape Town, in the Western Cape province of South Africa. As of 2024 there are 11 museums in the group.

== History ==
In 1998, five national museums in the Western Cape (the South African Cultural History Museum, South African Museum, South African National Gallery, the William Fehr Collection (at the Castle of Good Hope), and the Michaelis Collection) were amalgamated as the Southern Flagship Institution (SFI).

In July 2001, the SFI was officially renamed Iziko Museums of Cape Town, and in September 2012, renamed Iziko Museums of South Africa. Iziko Museums of South Africa (known as Iziko) is an agency of the national Department of Arts and Culture, which governs the national museums of the Western Cape. Iziko is a Xhosa word meaning "hearth".

The duties of the Iziko Council, a body consisting of eight members which is appointed by the minister every three years, is laid out in the Cultural Institutions Act, 1998 (Act No. 119 of 1998). As of 2024, the chair of the 8th Iziko Council is Dennis Jabulani Sithole.

The name is derived from the isiXhosa word iziko, meaning "hearth" — "traditionally and symbolically the social centre of the home; a place associated with warmth, kinship and the spirit of the ancestors".

The 11 museums are:

- Bertram House
- Bo-Kaap Museum
- Groot Constantia Manor House
- Koopmans-de Wet House
- Michaelis Collection at the Old Town House
- Rust en Vreugd
- Slave Lodge and Social History Centre
- Iziko South African Museum and Iziko Planetarium
- Iziko South African National Gallery and Annexe
- William Fehr Collection at the Castle of Good Hope

The Maritime Centre was located in the decommissioned World War II vessel SAS Somerset at the V&A Waterfront, but in April 2024 the decision was made to scrap the ship, after it had fallen into disrepair.
