= William Fehr =

South African businessman and art collector

- Born: 17 April 1892; Burgersdorp, Cape Colony
- Died: April 1968
- Occupations: Businessman, art Collector

William Fehr (17 April 1892 – 2 April 1968) was a South African businessman and art collector noted for his acquisition of famous artworks, known as the William Fehr Collection, now on display in the Castle of Good Hope in Cape Town. The collection was made publicly available for the first time in 1952 when Fehr and other collectors were invited to display historic pieces at the castle. A decade later the collection was purchased by the state and is now owned by The Department of Arts and Culture of South Africa.

== Early childhood ==
William Fehr was born in a remote colonial outpost called Burgersdorp, a small town that linked the Cape Colony in the eastern frontier to the south of the Free State via a newly built railway. Fehr attended an Academy school in the little town. In 1901 his father Carl Fehr, who was a successful businessman in the town, moved his family back to his hometown of Wiesbaden in Germany as a result of his poor health and the looming threat of the Anglo-Boer War. In Wiesbaden, William and his two younger siblings Gordon and Bertha attended Kënigliches Real-Gymnasium Schule.

== Early career ==
By 1912 William had taken up an apprenticeship at Edward Markus, a commerce firm in Berlin. In 1914 he became the head of the company's samples department at its London branch, a city that began refining his love for fine art.

Due to World War I, Carl decided to leave Europe and relocate his family back to the Cape Colony, with William following shortly thereafter. William found employment in East London at a commerce firm called Messrs. Malcomess & Co., Ltd.

== Personal art collection ==
During the 1920s William began assembling a personal art collection from colonial era Africa dating as far back as the 15th Century. This collection included paintings, prints and drawings, a collection which would later be extended to interior décor artefacts. His most prized works were in the form of personal pictures from his time growing up. William was fascinated with the ever-expanding and evolving medium of photography, and its ability to capture ordinary life onto a glass plate.

== William Fehr Collection ==
In the early to mid-19th Century there was a lack of systematic artefacts-gathering by South African cultural and heritage institutions, particularly by the South African government. By this time William was one of the foremost art collectors in South Africa. In 1952 he lent his personal collection for public exhibition to the Van Riebeeck Tercentenary Festival which was housed at the Castle of Good Hope. In 1964 the South African government purchased his personal collections, which by then included oil paintings, furniture, ceramic, metal and glassware. This collection can still be seen at the Castle of Good Hope today. In 1965 he donated more of his personal artefacts to the South African government, works which were housed at Rust en Vreugd in the Cape Town City Centre. The William Fehr Collection is administered by Iziko Museums of South Africa.

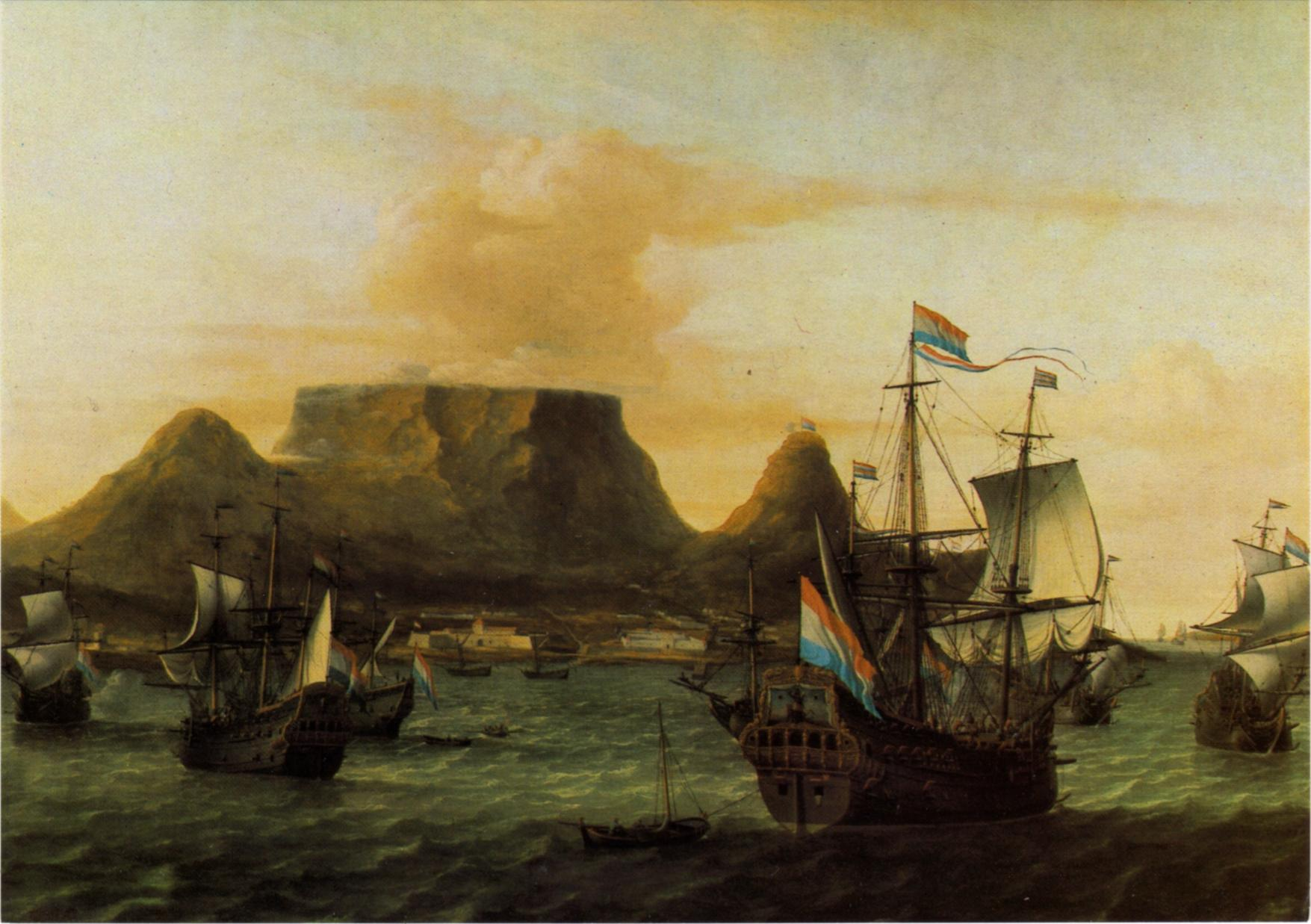
Table Bay, 1683, Aernout Smit (1683)

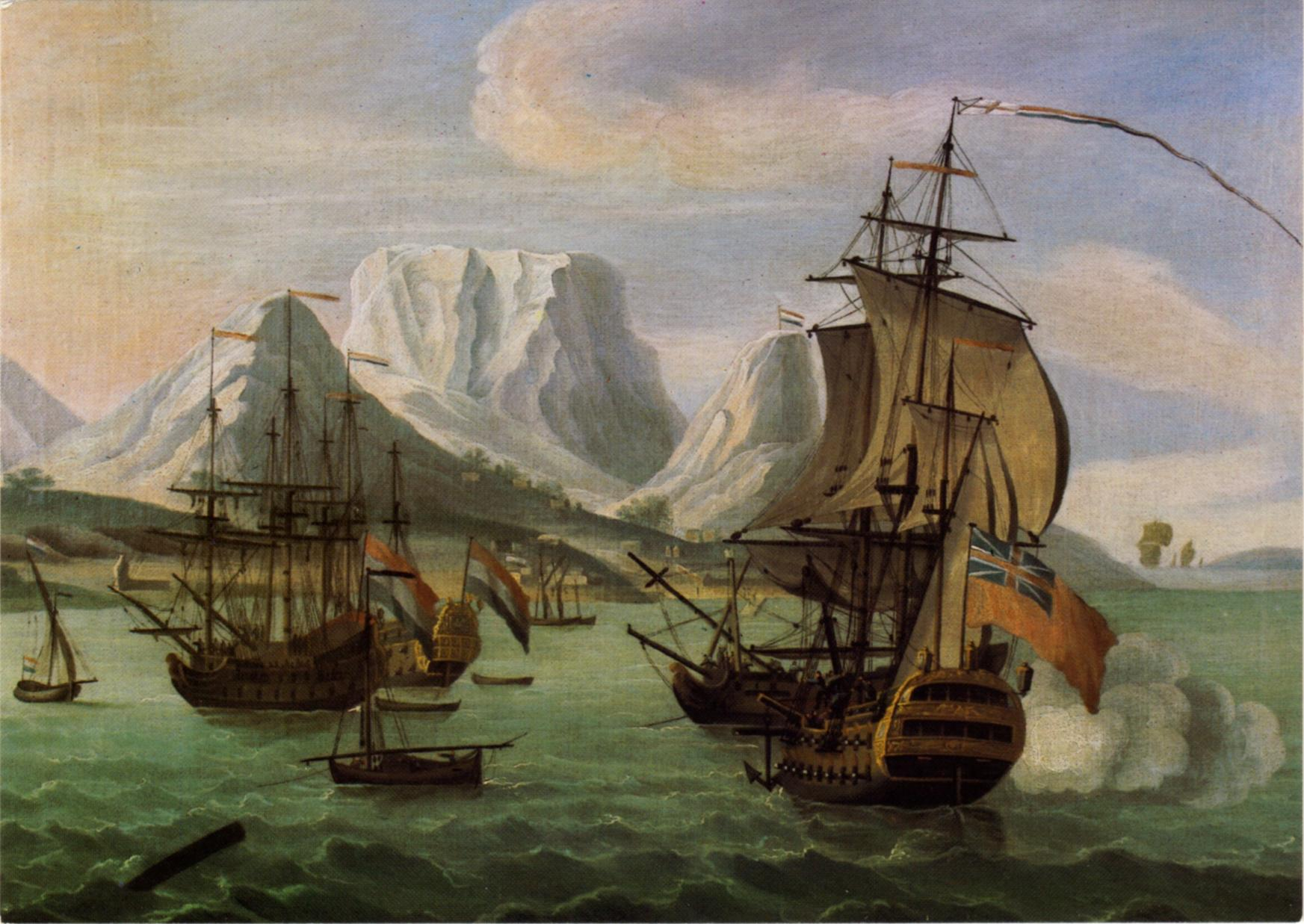
Table Bay, Samuel Scott (c. 1730)

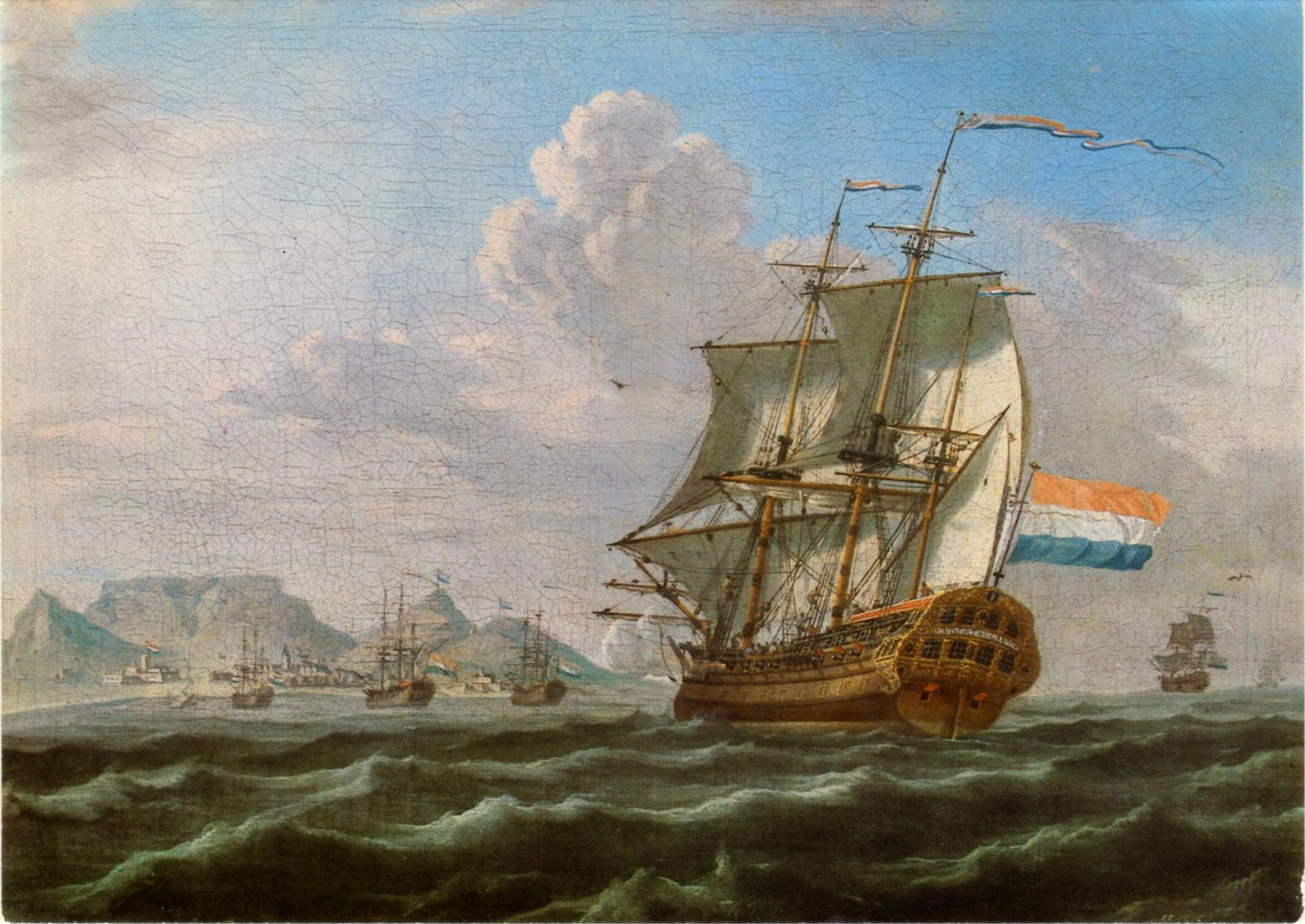
The Noord-Nieuwland in Table Bay, 1762, Unknown artist (1762)

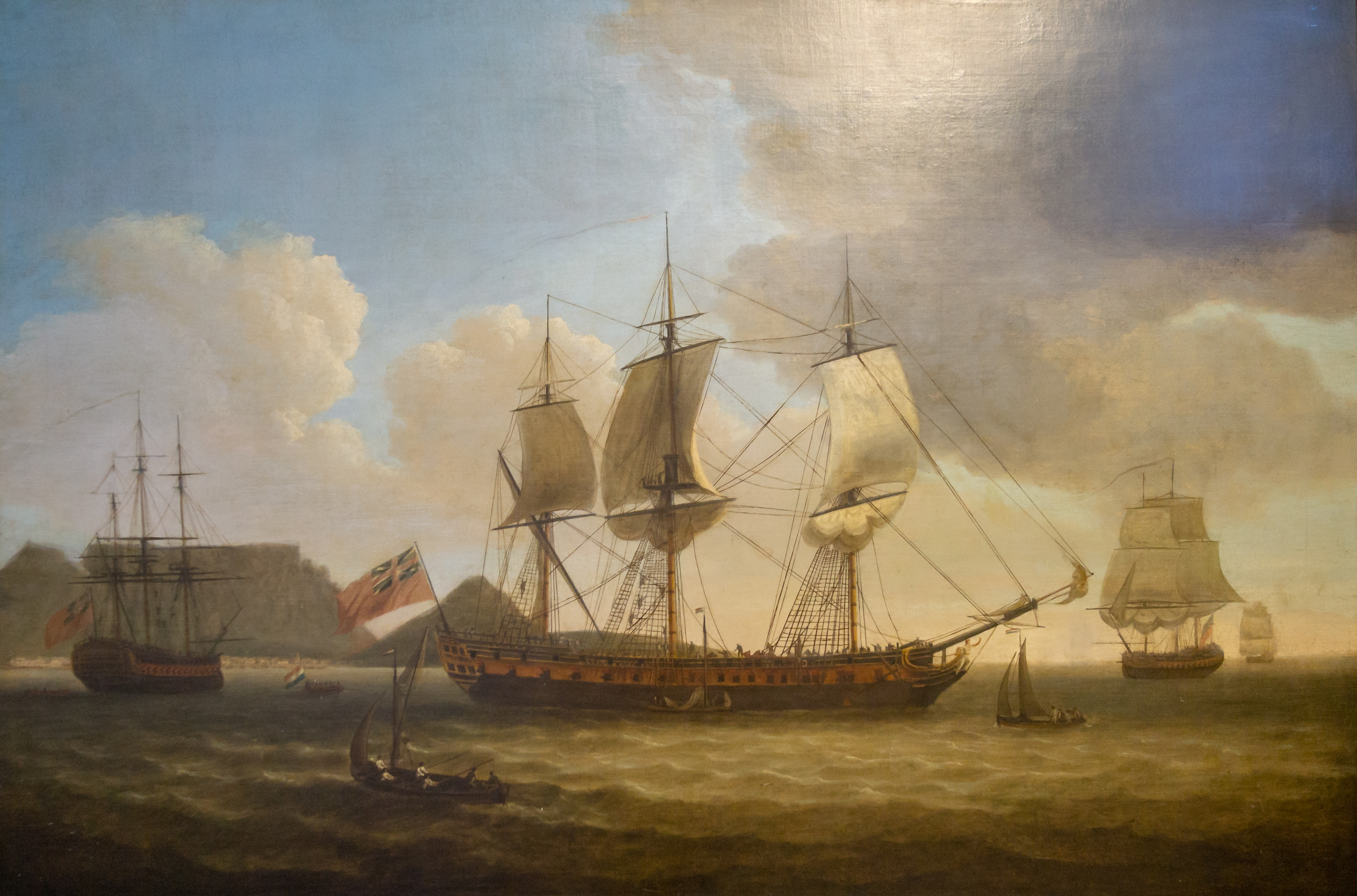
English ships in Table Bay, Robert Dodd (1787)

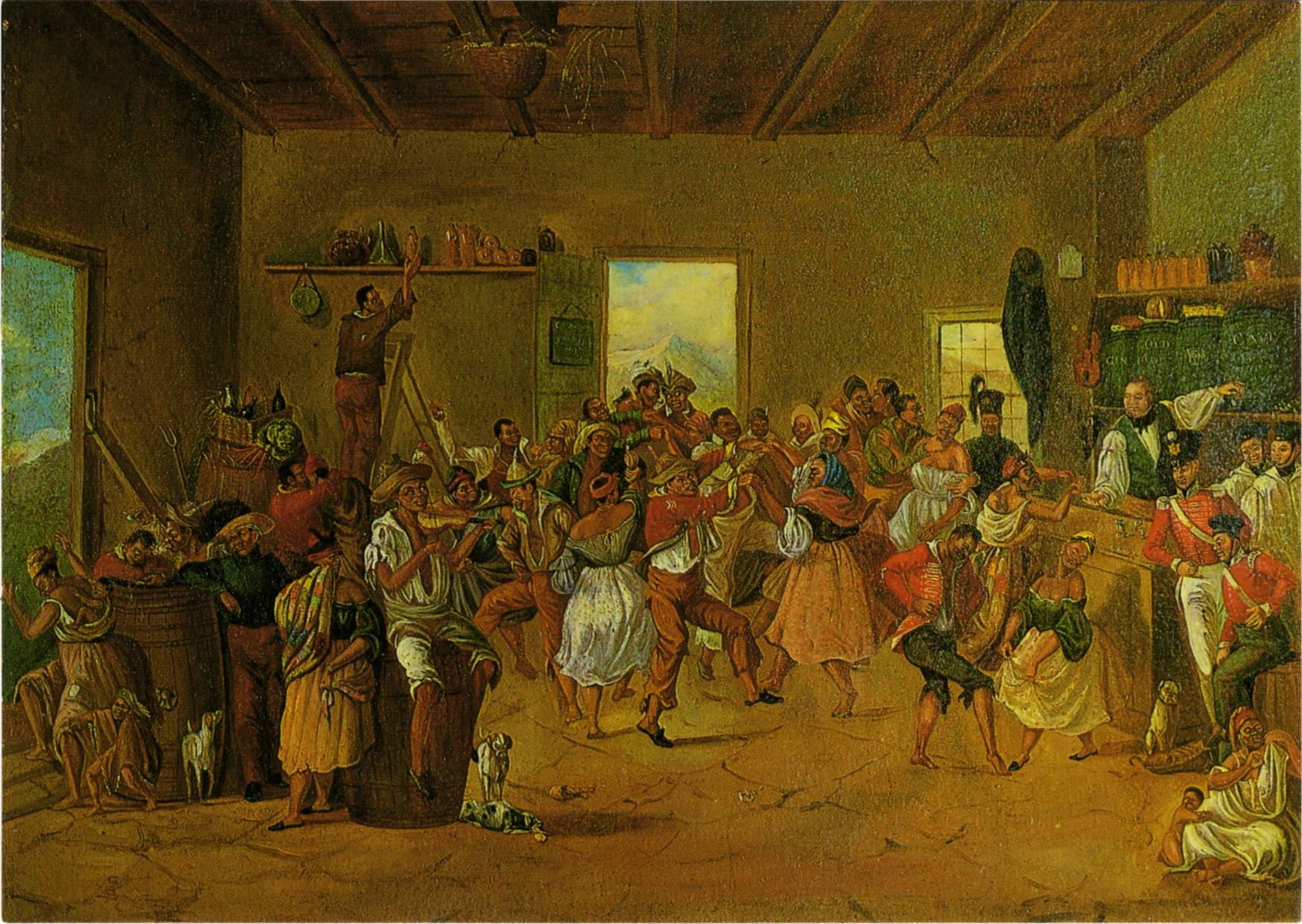
Canteen Scene during the Frontier Wars, Wilhelm Langschmidt (c. 1850)

== Legacy ==
Today local and international researchers and artists continue to show interest in studying The William Fehr Collection as a way on interrogating a part of Africa's cultural and colonial heritage. Prints have been done of some of the pictures being house at the Castle, which can now be purchased through the Africa Media Online portal.

== See also ==
- African art
- Founders Day
- Wilhelm II, German Emperor
