= Josua Nau Makoanyane =

Basotho military commander of Moshoeshoe I

- Born: Late 18th century Basotho territories
- Died: 19th century
- Occupation: Military commander
- Known for: Commander within Moshoeshoe I’s Matlama regiment

Josua Nau Makoanyane was a 19th-century Basotho military commander of the Matlama, a regiment closely linked to the authority of Moshoeshoe I, founder of the Basotho nation and king of what is present-day, Lesotho.

== Early life ==
Makoanyane was the son of Ntseke and became Moshoeshoe's companion in youth and later trusted as one of his military commanders, reportedly saving Moshoeshoe's life prior to the establishment of Thaba Bosiu as the mountain stronghold of the Basotho kingdom.Eldredge, Elizabeth A. (2002). "The Caledon River Valley and the Basotho of Moshoeshoe, 1821–33". Kingdoms and Chiefdoms of Southeastern Africa. University of Rochester Press.

== Initiation and age-set affiliation ==
Basotho political and military organization in the early nineteenth century was structured around initiation cohorts (mophato). Men initiated together at lebollo formed regiments that maintained lifelong bonds of solidarity and obligation.Eldredge, Elizabeth A. (1993). A South African Kingdom: The Pursuit of Security in Nineteenth-Century Lesotho. Cambridge University Press. Accordingly, to Basotho oral tradition, Makoanyane belonged to the same initiation cohort as Moshoeshoe I. Age-set affiliation was central to systems of trust, mobilisation, and regimental authority within Sotho-Tswana customs.Thompson, Leonard (1975). Survival in Two Worlds: Moshoeshoe of Lesotho 1786–1870. Clarendon Press.

== Military role and the Matlama regiment ==
During the Difaqane (Mfecane) and subsequent regional conflicts, regimental commanders formed the operational backbone of Basotho defense structures.Eldredge, Elizabeth A. (1993). A South African Kingdom. Cambridge University Press. Makoanyane is described in historical literature as a trusted military associate within Moshoeshoe's circle. Such commanders were responsible for mobilizing their age-set regiments, defending grazing and agricultural territories, and protecting strategic strongholds including Thaba Bosiu.Casalis, Eugène (1861). The Basutos; or, Twenty-Three Years in South Africa. James Nisbet. As tensions intensified with Boer expansion associated with the Orange Free State, regimental leadership became central to Basotho territorial defense.Thompson, Leonard (1975). Survival in Two Worlds. Clarendon Press.

== Cultural memory and later representation ==
Mosotho artist and sculptor, a descendant of Makoanyane, identified his great-grandfather as a commanding general in Moshoeshoe's army, reflecting the continuity of oral historical traditions linking the name to early Basotho military leadership. An exhibitions at Iziko Museums of South Africa in 2021 referenced this historical association in discussions of the artist's heritage and subject matter. ' 'KE LIHA PENE – I lay down my pen" was a 3D virtual exhibition that brought to life a collection of ceramic sculptures created by Samuele Makoanyane. The Order of Makoanyane in Lesotho, which is awarded for acts of extreme bravery and sometimes called the Order of Bravery,is named in his honor. The award exists as a 37mm medal produced by the Worcestershire Medal Service
