= Iziko South African Museum =

South African national museum in Cape Town

Coordinates: 33°55′44″S 18°24′54″E

- Suid-Afrikaanse Museum
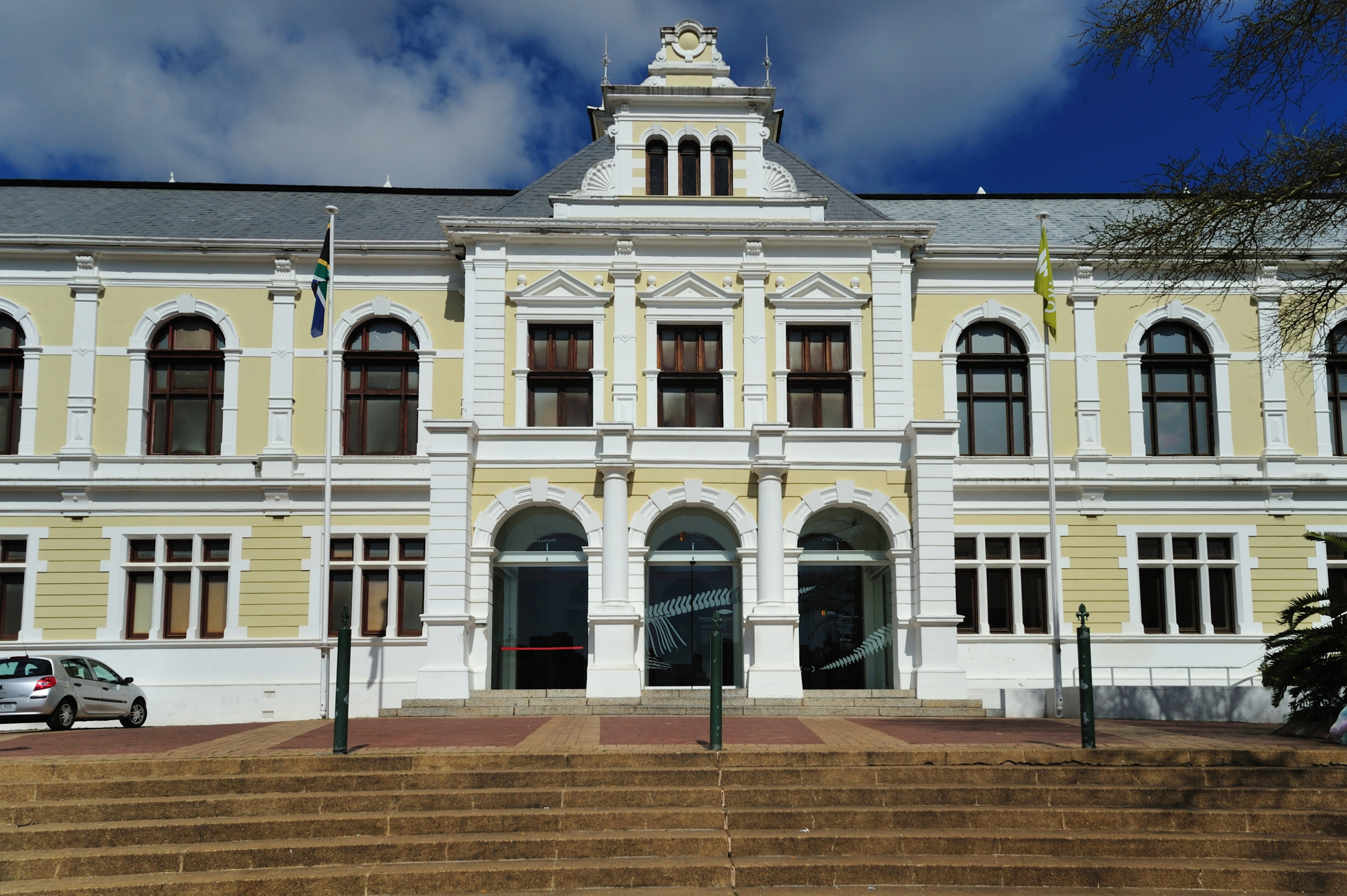
- Established: 1825; 201 years ago
- Location: Company's Garden
- Type: Zoology, palaeontology, archaeology
- Accreditation: Iziko museum
- Public transit access: Bus: MyCiTi 101, 106, 107
- Website: www.iziko.org.za/museums/south-african-museum/

The Iziko South African Museum, formerly the South African Museum (Afrikaans: Suid-Afrikaanse Museum), is a South African national museum located in Cape Town. The museum was founded in 1825, the first in the country. It has been on its present site in the Company's Garden since 1897. The museum houses important African zoology, palaeontology, and archaeology collections.

In 2012, the South African Museum was renamed to its present name. It is governed by the national museums' governing body, Iziko Museums of South Africa. Iziko is a Xhosa word meaning "hearth".

== History ==
The South African Museum was founded in 1825 by Lord Charles Somerset (1767–1831), who was Governor of the Cape Colony from 1814 to 1826.

The museum has been on its present site in the Company's Garden since 1897. It began as a general museum comprising natural history and material culture from local and other groups further afield. In time, it developed greater systematic organization and classification similar to the evolutionary models that were prominent in European and American museums in the late nineteenth and early twentieth centuries.

Frank Talbot was appointed as marine biologist at the museum in 1958, being promoted to assistant director in 1962. In 1964 he emigrated to Australia to take up a position at the Australian Museum, where he was later director for 10 years. He was an eminent ichthyologist, who had two fish species named after him, one of which (Stanulus talboti) was collected during his time at the South African museum.

This continued until the 1990s, with the reservation of cultural history museums for the display of settler histories and the relegation of material culture from other cultures to natural history and anthropology museums.

In September 2012 the South African Museum was renamed Iziko South African Museum (See #Governance below),

== Governance ==
In 1998, five national museums in the Western Cape were amalgamated as the Southern Flagship Institution (SFI). In July 2001, the SFI was officially renamed Iziko Museums of Cape Town.

In September 2012, renamed Iziko Museums of South Africa. Iziko Museums of South Africa is an agency of the national Department of Arts and Culture, which governs the national museums of the Western Cape, including Iziko South African Museum. Iziko is a Xhosa word meaning "hearth".

== Description ==
The museum specialises in African zoology, palaeontology, and archaeology. It houses over a million and a half scientific specimens, ranging from fossils up to 700 million years old to insects and fish caught a few days earlier. The collection also includes artefacts such as stone tools made by people 120,000 years ago, traditional clothes from the 20th century, and contemporary printed T-shirts.

== Permanent exhibitions ==
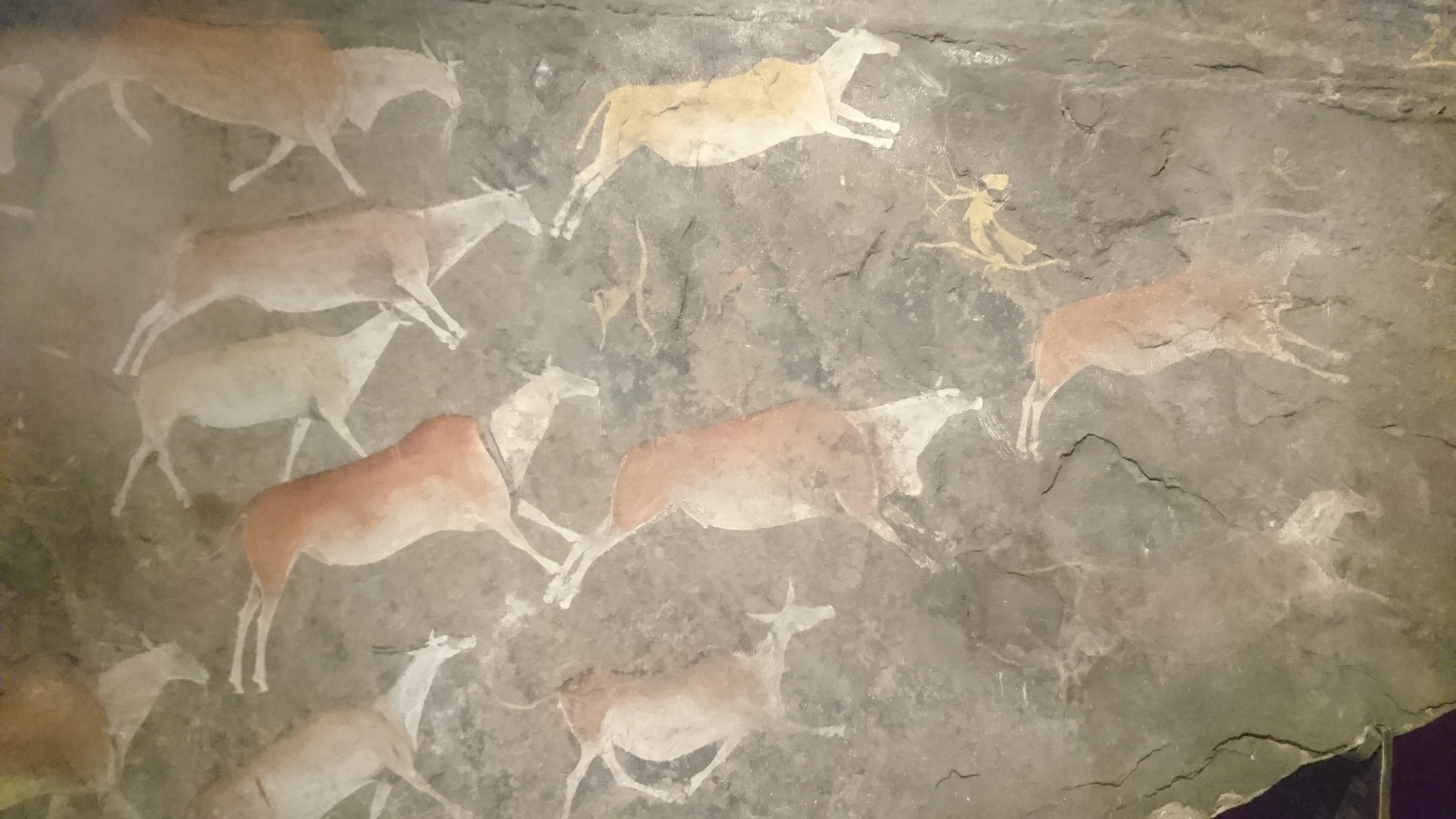
San rock art painting on display at the Iziko South African Museum

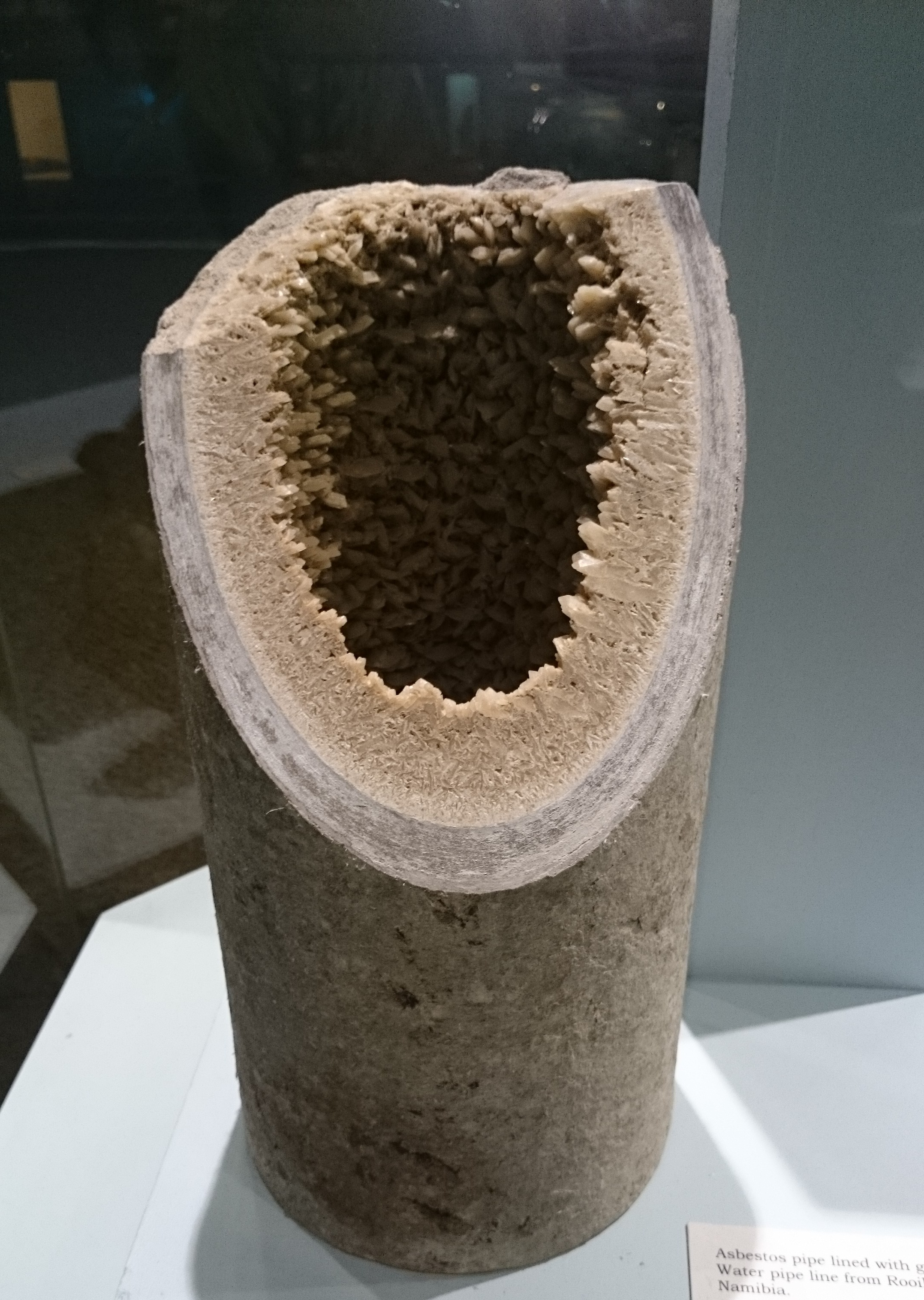
Asbestos pipeline with gypsum crystals. Water pipeline from Rooikop to Walvis Bay, Namibia

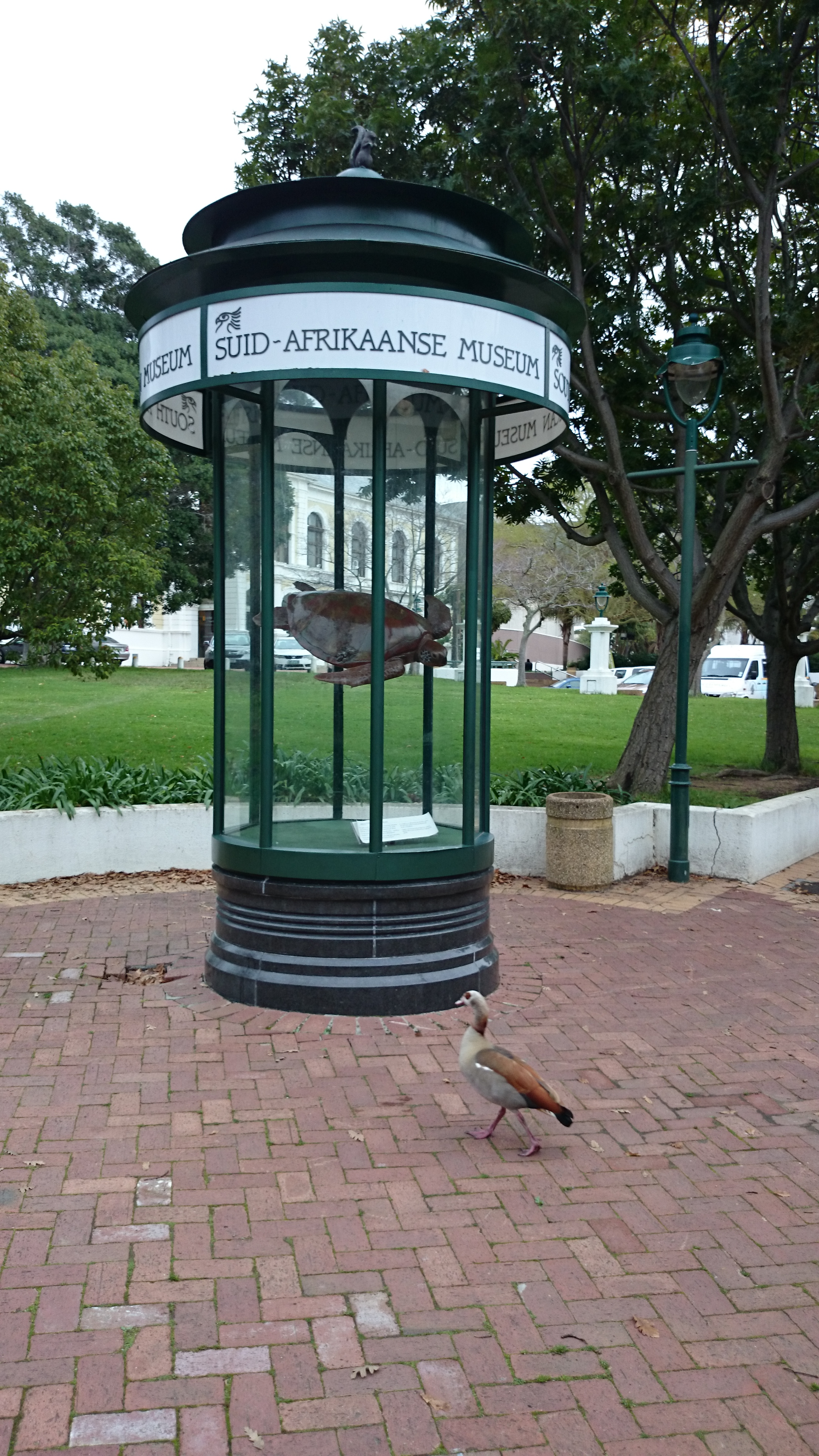
Iziko South African Museum

The museum is organized over four levels and hosts a variety of exhibitions, from rock art to fossils, marine animals and meteorites.

=== Ground level ===
- People past to present: consisting of three separate exhibitions:
  - The Power of Rock Art (on the ideas, knowledge and beliefs expressed in San rock art)
    - Opened in 2003, and remains the only permanent exhibit in the city that acknowledges San people and their history in South Africa.
  - African Cultures (material culture of Southern African hunter-gatherers and agriculturalists in historic times, as well as displays of material from Nguni people and Sotho–Tswana people, also collections from the Great Zimbabwe)
  - Lydenburg Heads (artifacts from the early Iron Age, symbols of the ritual life of early agriculturalists in South Africa).
- Karoo fossils: dioramas of mammal-like reptiles that lived in the region of Gondwana that became the Karoo during the Permian about 250 million years ago.
- World of water: depicting life in South Africa's oceans, comprises:
  - Coelacanth (a cast of the first Coelacanth discovered in 1938, with information on the biology and evolutionary history of this "living fossil")
  - Ocean Giants (features the longest and heaviest species of bony fish and the largest of all invertebrates).
- Southern oceans: animal life in the Subantarctic region.
- Whale well: a unique collection of whale casts and skeletons, to be seen from all floors; includes a 20.5-metre (67 ft) metre blue whale skeleton. You can also listen to the song of the humpback whale.
- Discovery room: a "hands-on" experience of real specimens and activities that encourage learning through discovery.

=== Level 1 ===
- Sharkworld all about the diversity, biology and conservation of sharks, skates, rays, and chimeras. Includes massive megatooth shark jaws and an audiovisual center.
- Iziko planetarium an extraordinary audio-visual experience expounding the wonders of the universe. Monthly flyers on current productions are available at the museum's entrance.
- Our place in the universe a display depicting a cosmic zoom to view the universe on an ever-increasing scale, reaching back to almost the very beginning of the universe.
- Meteorites features three large iron meteorites.

=== Level 2 ===
- Mammals mainly Southern African mammals, including a foal of the extinct quagga.
- Birds Southern African and exotic birds, avian evolution, dioramas of waterbirds and seabirds.
- Wonders of nature found on the mezzanine level overlooking the bird gallery. Features a selection of objects showing the beauty and diversity of natural form.
- History of the SA Museum shows the history of the museum from its beginnings in 1825 until 1975.
- Mindspace on-line resource center.
- Indigenous knowledge an important part of South Africa's heritage. This exhibition is a window on indigenous ways of using natural resources.
- There are also a collection of South African and foreign minerals, an exhibition on the biology of bats and a geological model of Table Mountain.

=== Level 3 ===
- Stone bones of the ancient Karoo focuses on 250-million-year-old mammal-like reptile (therapsids) fossils from the Karoo with reconstructions of what they might have looked like. Features the evolution of mammals from the therapsids, and the End-Permian Extinction – believed to be the biggest extinction event Earth has ever experienced.

== Virtual and temporary exhibitions ==
During the COVID-19 pandemic, Iziko launched a series of virtual exhibitions, including 'Ke Liha Pene' by Samuele Makoanyane, 'Looking A Head: Revisiting the Lydenburg Heads', 'Boonstra Diarama', 'Tata Madiba Virtual Exhibition', 'World of Wasps', 'Enduring Covid19' and 'The Journeys of the Sao Jose'.

== Representations of Khoi and San people ==
"Bushmen", referring collectively to San and Khoi indigenous groups, were considered lowest on the evolutionary timescale and as living remnants of "civilised" man's prehistory, akin to the highest form of ape. As such, they became the subject of intensive research, particularly from 1906 onwards under the directorship of Louis Péringuey. Subsequent research on Bushmen was informed by the rise of physical anthropology, a discipline in the European scientific community that drew direct correlation between physical type and evolutionary status and therefore intellectual, cultural and social status, as discussed in a 1988 article by Annie Coombes. Between 1907 and 1924 Péringuey initiated a casting project, carried out by museum modeller James Drury, in which 68 body casts of "pure Bushmen specimens" were taken in a process that was both humiliating and painful for the participants. The title of Drury's book, Bushman, whale and dinosaur, detailing his 40-year affiliation with the South African Museum, gives some indication of the status these specimens were given.

=== Bushman Diorama ===
Some of the casts made by museum modeller James Drury were displayed in the South African Museum from 1911 but without any contextualisation or acknowledgement of the Bushmen's complex social and cultural networks. With accompanying museum labels in which they were continually referred to in the past tense, the Bushmen were consigned to history and extinction. It was only in the late 1950s that Drury's casts were given any contextualisation in the form of the Bushman Diorama when they were displayed in an invented cultural setting based on an early nineteenth-century painting by Samuel Daniell. However, the newly revised label once again emphasised the narrative of extinction and lacked any historical contextualisation or information about the Bushmen's individual histories.

The Bushman Diorama was not the only South African Museum display that historicised ethnic groups in this way. The African culture gallery also featured a series of displays of casts or models of "dark-skinned people" (in ethnically defined groups) who "live in rural areas and are located in timeless places such as 'tribes' or 'groups'". The Bushman Diorama deserves particular attention though, as it has been at the centre of much contestation but also a popular tourist attraction for foreigners, locals and schools. The focus of tours was largely the physical appearance of the figures; teachers and tour guides would routinely use the display to emphasise racialised physical features such as skin, hair type, body shape and genital forms.

In 1989, in recognition of the ethical and unequal power dimensions involved in the display, the South African Museum took the first steps to mediate the diorama. This came in the shape of an adjoining exhibition that investigated the rationale for the casting project and explored the backgrounds and identities of the people who had been cast. Photographs from the casting process were shown and one of the figures was dressed in early twentieth century (instead of hunter-gather) attire to alert viewers to the constructed nature of the diorama. Continued revision occurred in 1993 with Out of Touch, an auto-critique that added "dilemma labels" and contrasting superimposed images to the display cases in the African cultures gallery (and the diorama) in order to destabilise the narrative and to "qualify previous notions of cultural stasis by acknowledging urbanisation and other changes".

=== Miscast ===
The exhibition that was most seriously aimed at a revisionist history of the diorama was also the most controversial and publicly debated. In 1996 Miscast: Negotiating the Presence of Khoi and San History and Material Culture was exhibited, not at the South African Museum, but at the neighbouring South African National Gallery in order to counterpose the ethnographic discourse that had characterised the Bushmen in such a disparaging manner. The curator, Pippa Skotnes, used installation art as a medium, which focussed on the visual elements of the exhibition and the visitors' experiences. However, installation art, which allows a great degree of freedom for the artist, also allows for more varied interpretations (and misinterpretations) from the audience. The exhibition featured Bushman material culture, thirteen resin casts of Bushmen bodies and body parts, instruments used in physical anthropology and a vinyl floor underlaid with generally derogatory newspaper articles, official documents and pictures of Bushmen from the late nineteenth and early twentieth centuries. These were contrasted with photographs on the walls of contemporary Bushman life taken between 1984 and 1995.

Visitors having to step on representations of Bushmen was seen as a "trampling of culture" and many of the visitors felt that Skotnes had reiterated the ethnographic and museological practices that she was trying to challenge. The exhibition also brought to the fore politics of identity and representation. Bushmen representatives argued that Skotnes could not speak about or for people she "did not understand" and while some consultative protocols were followed with "official groups that were just forming", the general consensus was that these were inadequate.

After Miscast there have been various exhibitions at the South African Museum and South African National Gallery with a general focus on Bushmen rock art and paintings. One of the exhibitions ended with a Bushman healing ceremony that included the lighting of a sacred peace pipe and traditional song and dance. These exhibitions also utilised strategies such as quotes from Bushmen individuals and a replica cave with its interior coated by a giant photograph of a real cave to "allow the viewer to experience something approximating what the Bushmen might have felt originally" and as an answer to the deficiencies of past Bushmen displays. In April 2001, the Bushman Diorama was closed.
