= Mosotho Chakela =

Mosotho singer (1963- 2021)

- Born: 1 January 1963
- Died: 5 January 2021 (aged 58)
- Citizenship: Lesotho
- Occupation: Singer

Mokete Shadrack Chakela (1 January 1963 – 5 January 2021), more commonly known as Mosotho Chakela or just Chakela, was a Mosotho cultural music singer in a popular Lesotho musical tradition called famo. Chakela died on 5 January 2021.

== Music ==
Mosotho Chakela rose to prominence with his first album named Motsamai le Chakela no.1. The album was released in 1999 by the Shear Record Company, and it sold enough copies to achieve platinum status. The album has hits like "O ka nketsang", "Ha ke noa joala" and "Mosali". He came to the spotlight again the following year with another hit album called Motsamai le Chakela no.2. He has since been consistent, releasing hit after hit.

In 2006 Chakela was awarded a South African Traditional Music Award for best musician in the Famo music category.

In 2003 Chakela did a song with Doc Shebeleza titled "Ha ke Tahelwe Ha Motho"

== Business ==
Apart from his singing talent, Chakela is a businessman in Lesotho. He owns 13 liqueur stores, seven of which are located in the capital city of Lesotho, Maseru. Three of those are in Leribe while the remaining three are in the second largest town where he was born, Mafeteng.

== Politics ==
Chakela has used his prominence as a musician to make political points. In his second album, he talks about the political leaders of Lesotho which made him an eye opener to many Basotho nations. In the politics of Lesotho he is aligned with the All Basotho Convention.
