= Morija Museum & Archives =

Coordinates: 29.626287°S 27.508859°E

Morija Museum and Archives
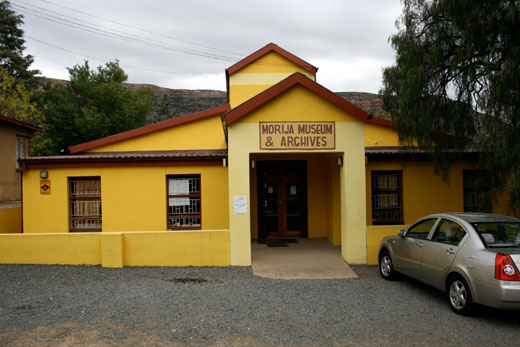
- The exterior of the Morija Museum and Archives in Morija, Lesotho
- Established: 1956
- Location: Morija, Lesotho
- Type: History, Archaeology, Paleontology and Culture
- Curator: Ms. 'Mamokuena Makhema
- Website: morijamuseum.org

Morija Museum & Archives, also known as Morija Museum, is located in Morija, a large village in the Maseru district of Lesotho. The museum was formally opened in 1956, and entered its present permanent facilities in 1989. The purpose of the museum is to carry on the tradition of Morija, as a centre of learning, innovation and excellence, in Lesotho. Morija Museum is home to many cultural treasures including, traditional Basotho artifacts as well as Lifaqane and Boer War memorabilia. The archives portion of the museum includes documents dated as far back as 1826. This collection is extremely rich in 19th century documentation related to Lesotho.

== Special projects ==
The Morija Arts & Cultural Festival is an annual event coordinated by the Morija Museum. The Masitise Cave House is a satellite location of the Morija Museum. It is located in the Quthing district, in a village about 15 km west of the camp town.

== See also ==
- Morija Arts & Cultural Festival
- Lesotho Culture
