= Fit to Govern: The Native Intelligence of Thabo Mbeki =

Fit to Govern: The native intelligence of Thabo Mbeki is a 2007 biography of Former South African President Thabo Mbeki by British West Indian writer Ronald Suresh Roberts.

== Background ==
Following Roberts' work on the South African constitution, Mbeki approached him to write the first authorised biography of his life.

== Criticism ==
Roberts' work on Mbeki was heavily criticised as a hagiography. Absa Group Limited sponsored the book, contributing R1.43 million towards it. The Democratic Alliance political party accused Minister in the Presidency Essop Pahad of arranging for the sponsorship as an official act of the South African government, rather than as a private citizen, despite Pahad's reporting directly to Mbeki.

In 2007, author Anthony Brink accused Roberts of plagiarising sections of the biography and launched a campaign to publicise the claim by way of an e-book titled Lying and Thieving: The Fraudulent Scholarship of Ronald Suresh Roberts in "Fit to Govern: The Native Intelligence of Thabo Mbeki".
