= Essop Pahad =

South African politician (1939–2023)

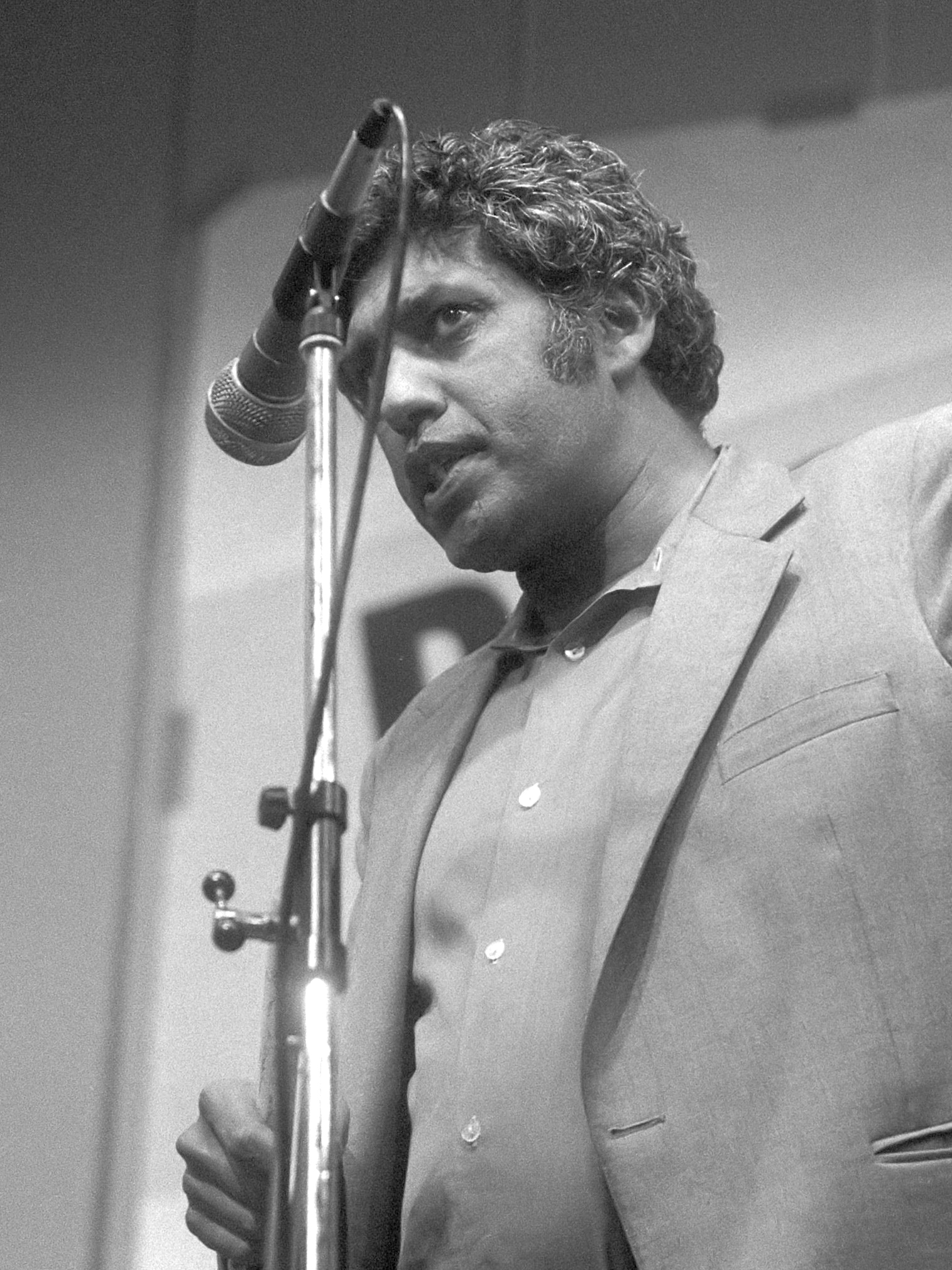
- Pahad in 1985

Minister in the Presidency
- In office 14 June 1999 – 24 September 2008

Member of Parliament
- In office 10 May 1994 – 2008

Parliamentary Counsellor
- In office 10 May 1994 – 14 June 1999

Personal details
- Born: Essop Goolam Pahad; 21 June 1939 Schweizer-Reneke, Transvaal, South Africa
- Died: 6 July 2023 (aged 84) Emmarentia, Johannesburg, South Africa
- Resting place: Westpark Cemetery
- Party: African National Congress
- Relations: Aziz Pahad (brother)
- Children: 2
- Parent: Amina Pahad (mother)
- Education: University of the Witwatersrand; University of Sussex
- Awards: Pravasi Bharatiya Samman

Essop Goolam Pahad (21 June 1939 – 6 July 2023) was a South African politician. He served as the Minister in the Presidency from 1999 to 2008, and was a close ally of Thabo Mbeki.

== Early life ==
Pahad was born in Schweizer-Reneke in what was then the Transvaal Province. He was an alumnus of both the University of the Witwatersrand (Wits) and the University of Sussex. He started his academic career with a Bachelor of Arts degree in political science at Wits. At the University of Sussex, he completed a Master of Arts in African politics as well as his PhD in history. The title of his thesis was "The Development of Indian Political Movements in South Africa 1924 – 1946." He was the brother of Aziz Pahad.

== Political career ==
His political career began in 1958 when he became a member of the Transvaal Indian Youth Congress. In 1962, Pahad was arrested for organising an illegal strike, following the banning of the African National Congress. In December 1964, Pahad was banned for five years and went into exile. While in exile, Pahad became more actively involved with the ANC and the SACP. He represented the SACP on the editorial council for the World Marxist Review.

=== Career in government ===
After the 1994 South African general election, Pahad served as the Parliamentary Counsellor to then-Deputy President Thabo Mbeki. He was appointed the Minister in the Presidency after the 1999 general election. In 2000, it was reported that at a closed session of the ANC's governance committee Pahad tried to squash an inquiry into corruption in the Arms Deal, an accusation that Pahad denied despite numerous reports to the contrary.

Pahad was also involved in raising R1.55 million from corporate sponsors to hire Ronald Suresh Roberts to write a biography of then President Mbeki.

After Mbeki's resignation as President of South Africa in September 2008, Pahad submitted his resignation as Minister.

== Post-2008 ==
Pahad was a member of the Organising Committee of the 2010 FIFA World Cup held in South Africa, and claimed in 2008 that South African whites wanted the event to be a failure. An independent survey by Human Sciences Research Council (HSRC) reported in January 2010 that South African whites in fact generally supported the event.

Pahad was filmed attending the wedding of Vega Gupta and Aakash Jahajgarhia an event which sparked the so-called Guptagate scandal in South Africa.

Pahad was the board chairman of South Africa/Mali Timbuktu Manuscripts Trust as well as chairman of the board of trustees for the South African Democracy Education Trust, and a member of the national executive committee of the African National Congress. After leaving government in 2008, Pahad launched a South African monthly (later quarterly) journal named The Thinker, which was later taken over by the University of Johannesburg in 2019.

== Death and funeral ==
Pahad died of cancer on 6 July 2023, at the age of 84, and his funeral was attended by a number of high profile ANC figures, including Acting President of South Africa Paul Mashatile. He was buried alongside Jessie Duarte and Ebrahim Ebrahim at Westpark Cemetery, where his brother Aziz was also buried two months later.
