= Ann Bernstein =

South African commentator

- Occupations: Executive director of the Centre for Development and Enterprise
- Awards: Sir Antony Fisher International Memorial Award (2012); University of Johannesburg Ellen Kuzwayo Award (2019)

Academic background
- Education: Witwatersrand University (BA); University of California, Los Angeles (MA)

Academic work
- Discipline: Development economics
- Main interests: Labour economics, education policy, social welfare, corporate social responsibility
- Notable works: The Case for Business in Developing Economies (2010)

Ann Bernstein is a South African analyst and commentator who is executive directors of the Centre for Development and Enterprise. A prolific writer on South African social and economic policy, she is known for her pro-business views about the contribution of corporations to social and economic development.

== Background and positions ==
Bernstein has a BA degree from the University of the Witwatersrand and an MA in urban planning from the University of California, Los Angeles. From 1989 to 1995, she was an executive director of the Urban Foundation, an influential think tank established by Anglo American to lobby for reform in the apartheid government's approach to black urbanisation. During the same period, she joined the board of the Development Bank of Southern Africa, where she served until 2001.

Bernstein was a Reagan-Fascell Fellow at the American National Endowment for Democracy in 2005–2006, a public policy scholar at the Wilson Center in 2013, a faculty member at the World Economic Forum in 2008–2009, and a fellow at the Bellagio Center in 2016. She joined the board of the Brenthurst Foundation in 2007 and is a member of the Academy of Science of South Africa. In 2019, the University of Johannesburg awarded her the Ellen Kuzwayo Council Award for outstanding contributions to the higher education sector and to society.

== Centre for Development and Enterprise ==
Bernstein was and remains the founding director of the Centre for Development and Enterprise (CDE), which was established in 1995. It is an independent, pro-business think tank based in Johannesburg and focused on social and economic development policy. Early in her tenure as CDE director, in 1997, she testified at the Truth and Reconciliation Commission's special hearings on the role of business in apartheid. In a submission described as uniquely "blunt", Bernstein told the commission that business had "accommodated itself to the apartheid system" and, as argued by modernisation theorists, proposed that business, simply by maintaining economic activity, had contributed to improved living standards and had thereby unintentionally contributed to democratisation in South Africa. She also rejected the commission's notion that businesses had social or moral responsibilities beyond contributing to economic activity:

Corporations are not institutions established for moral purposes. They are functional institutions created to perform an economic task... This does not of course absolve individuals within companies from moral choices, but that is a different matter.

Writing in the Mail & Guardian, Ronald Suresh Roberts said that Bernstein's submission was a "thoughtful" statement of "the weight of business opinion", but criticised her for indulging business's desire "both to have its cake and eat it... both to exempt business from moral claims and also to deny that apartheid business was immoral".

In 1999, Bernstein was the lead writer on Policy-Making in a New Democracy, a lengthy report published by CDE that drew public criticism from Jeremy Cronin of the South African Communist Party. Cronin accused of CDE of becoming "self-appointed praise-singer" to President Thabo Mbeki and his controversial macroeconomic policy, and moreover said that its "sycophantic" treatment of Mbeki arose from its pursuit of "a radical transformation of the political landscape, not least of the ANC, the better to unleash its modernising, neo-liberal project". Bernstein responded by reiterating CDE's support for state-led development and suggesting, "It's time to call the bluff on those who mount easy sloganistic attacks on the direction and toughness of government economic policy."

== Publications ==
Bernstein writes widely for public audiences, most regularly in the Business Day. She writes primarily about the labour market, education policy, and the role of business in social, economic, and political development. She has also been a vocal opponent of proposals to introduce a basic income grant in South Africa.

She co-edited Business and Democracy: Cohabitation or Contradiction? (1998) with Peter L. Berger and Migration and Refugee Policies (1999) with Myron Weiner. Her own book, The Case for Business in Developing Economies, was published by Penguin in 2010 and won the Atlas Network's 2012 Sir Antony Fisher International Memorial Award. Described by the Economist as "one of the best books on business and development in recent years", it presents a "combative" argument for the positive contribution of corporations, and even of "so-called sweatshops", to development. In the book, Bernstein argues that contemporary anti-corporatism and an emphasis on corporate social responsibility, fostered in the West by people such as Naomi Klein, threatens to contaminate and misguide the policy debate in developing countries.

== See also ==
- The Democratic Alternative from the South, Ann Bernstein
