= Gora Ebrahim =

South African politician and anti-apartheid activist (1936–1999)

Member of the National Assembly
- In office May 1994 – June 1999

Personal details
- Born: Ahmed Gora Ebrahim; 29 May 1936 Durban, Natal Province; Union of South Africa
- Died: 25 November 1999 (aged 63) Berea, Gauteng; Republic of South Africa
- Party: African National Congress (since 1999)
- Other political affiliations: Pan Africanist Congress (1957–1999)
- Relations: Ebrahim Ebrahim (brother)

Ahmed Gora Ebrahim (29 May 1936 – 25 November 1999) was a South African politician and former anti-apartheid activist. He was the foreign secretary of the Pan Africanist Congress (PAC) during apartheid and represented the party in the National Assembly from 1994 to 1999. Shortly after losing his parliamentary seat in June 1999, and shortly before his death in November that year, he defected to the African National Congress (ANC).

== Early life and anti-apartheid activism ==
Ebrahim was born on 29 May 1936 in Durban in the former Natal province. He and his younger brother, Ebrahim Ismail, were both politically active in their youth, in his case in Trotskyite circles at Natal University and the University of the Witwatersrand. However, while his brother joined the ANC, he joined the PAC in 1957 and went into exile in 1963 after the party was banned.

Over the next three decades, Ebrahim was a prominent representative of the PAC abroad, at different times serving as its chief representative in Egypt, in Iraq, in China, in Zimbabwe, and at the United Nations in New York. In 1969, based in Dar es Salaam, Tanzania, he was appointed as the PAC's secretary for foreign affairs. He was also a founding member of the South African Non Racial Olympic Committee and served as its acting president when Dennis Brutus was detained, and during his five years in Iraq, he was editor of the Baghdad Observer. He returned to South Africa in 1990, after the PAC was unbanned by the apartheid government, and he was a member of the PAC's delegation to the negotiations that ended apartheid.

== Post-apartheid political career ==
In South Africa's first post-apartheid elections in 1994, Ebrahim was elected to represent the PAC in the National Assembly. After a single term in the assembly, he lost his seat in the 1999 general election, in which the PAC performed poorly. In the aftermath of the election, media reports suggested that Ebrahim was on the brink of defecting from the PAC to the ANC, which had apparently offered him a diplomat post; he defected soon afterwards.

== Personal life and death ==
Ebrahim met his French wife, Xaviere, in China, where she worked as a translator. They had two children, a son and a daughter, who were born in exile in Tanzania.

Months after joining the ANC, Ebrahim died on 25 November 1999 at his home in Berea, Johannesburg after suffering a heart attack.
