= Sue van der Merwe =

South African politician (born 1954)

Member of the National Assembly
- In office 15 January 1996 – 16 October 2013

Deputy Minister of International Relations and Cooperation
- In office 11 May 2009 – 1 November 2010 Serving with Ebrahim Ebrahim
- President: Jacob Zuma
- Minister: Maite Nkoana-Mashabane
- Succeeded by: Marius Fransman
- In office 29 April 2004 – 10 May 2009 (as Deputy Minister of Foreign Affairs); Serving with Aziz Pahad
- President: Kgalema Motlanthe; Thabo Mbeki
- Minister: Nkosazana Dlamini-Zuma

Personal details
- Born: Susan Comber Young; 29 May 1954 (age 72) Cape Province, Union of South Africa
- Party: African National Congress
- Spouse: Tiaan van der Merwe (died 1991)
- Education: University of Cape Town

Susan Comber van der Merwe (née Young; born 29 May 1954) is a South African politician who served as Deputy Minister of Foreign Affairs from April 2004 to November 2010. Before that, she was parliamentary counsellor to President Thabo Mbeki from January 2001 to April 2004. Formerly a Black Sash activist in the Cape Province, she represented the African National Congress (ANC) in the National Assembly from January 1996 until her resignation in October 2013.

== Early life and career ==
Van der Merwe was born on 29 May 1954 in present-day Eastern Cape and grew up in Port Elizabeth. Her mother, Betty-Ann Young, met her father, a South African cleric, while posted to South Africa as a diplomat. Van der Merwe matriculated at Collegiate High School in Port Elizabeth in 1971 and, after a year-long American Field Service cultural exchange, completed a Bachelor of Arts at the University of Cape Town in 1976.

During apartheid, she volunteered for the Progressive Federal Party, a white opposition party, and for Black Sash; she was coordinator of Black Sash's Cape Town advice office from 1988 to 1991. From 1991 to 1993, she participated in the Mont Fleur scenario planning exercise ahead of South Africa's democratic transition, and from 1993 to 1995 she was an executive assistant at the Open Society Foundation, where she worked in the community radio section. She also sat on the board of directors of UMAC, a non-profit in the Cape Province, from 1992 to 2002.

== Parliament: 1996–2013 ==
In South Africa's first post-apartheid elections in 1994, van der Merwe stood as a candidate on the ANC's party list but was ranked 144th and did not expect to be elected. However, she joined the National Assembly on 15 January 1996, filling a casual vacancy in the ANC caucus, and remained in her seat until 16 October 2013. She was a backbencher until January 2001, when President Thabo Mbeki announced his first cabinet reshuffle and appointed van der Merwe as his parliamentary counsellor; she succeeded Charles Nqakula, who had been named as Deputy Minister of Home Affairs. Later that year, the ANC's National Executive Committee (NEC) appointed her to a newly formed "political committee" in the ANC parliamentary caucus, chaired by Deputy President Jacob Zuma.

=== Deputy Minister: 2004–2010 ===
She remained in office as parliamentary counsellor until after the 2004 general election, when Mbeki appointed her to a newly created post as second Deputy Minister of Foreign Affairs; she served under Minister Nkosazana Dlamini-Zuma and alongside the long-serving first deputy minister, Aziz Pahad. She was succeeded as parliamentary counsellor by Manne Dipico. Although commentator and former MP David Dalling said that van der Merwe was "publicly invisible" in her government office, she was elected as a member of the ANC NEC at the party's 52nd National Conference in December 2007; by number of votes received, she was ranked 54th among the 80 candidates elected.

After the next general election in 2009, newly elected President Jacob Zuma retained van der Merwe in the newly renamed post of Deputy Minister of International Relations and Cooperation. However, in a reshuffle on 1 November 2010, she was fired and replaced by Marius Fransman. News24 reported that she had asked to be relieved of her position, while the Mail & Guardian said that she had not known that she would be removed until she heard Zuma's announcement.

=== Return to the backbenches: 2010–2013 ===
Van der Merwe continued to serve as an ordinary MP, and in December 2012 she was narrowly re-elected to a second five-year term on the ANC NEC, ranked 76th of the 80 elected members. She resigned from her seat with effect from 16 October 2013. Minister Trevor Manuel, a friend of van der Merwe's since the Mont Fleur exercise, delivered a farewell address in Parliament, describing her work as "characterised by her love for politics and a clear sense of honour".

== Later career ==
Upon resigning from Parliament, van der Merwe said that she intended to spend more time on non-profit work but would remain an active member of the ANC and would participate in its 2014 election campaign. At that time, she was already a non-executive director at Sibanye Gold, a mining company, and in February 2020 she was appointed as an independent non-executive director at Sibanye-Stillwater. She also joined the national council of the South African Institute of International Affairs in 2014.

She served the remainder of her five-year term as a member of the ANC NEC, which ended in December 2017. In February 2016, the NEC deployed van der Merwe and Dipuo Letsatsi-Duba as interim caretakers of the ANC's Western Cape branch after the incumbent provincial chairperson, Marius Fransman, was removed from office. In May 2017, she was one of 18 NEC members who supported a motion, tabled by Joel Netshitenzhe, proposing that Zuma should step down as ANC president.

== Personal life ==
Van der Merwe was married to Tiaan van der Merwe, whom she met at the University of Cape Town; he was a prominent opposition politician in the apartheid-era House of Assembly before he died in a car accident in 1991. They had two children.

In April 2013, van der Merwe was injured in a robbery at her home in Rondebosch, Cape Town.
