= Westpark Cemetery =

Cemetery in Johannesburg, South Africa

- Interactive map of Westpark Cemetery

Details
- Established: 1942
- Location: Beyers Naude Drive, Montgomery Park, Johannesburg, Gauteng
- Coordinates: 26°9′49″S 27°59′23″E
- Owned by: Johannesburg City Parks
- Website: jhbcityparks.com
- Find a Grave: Westpark Cemetery

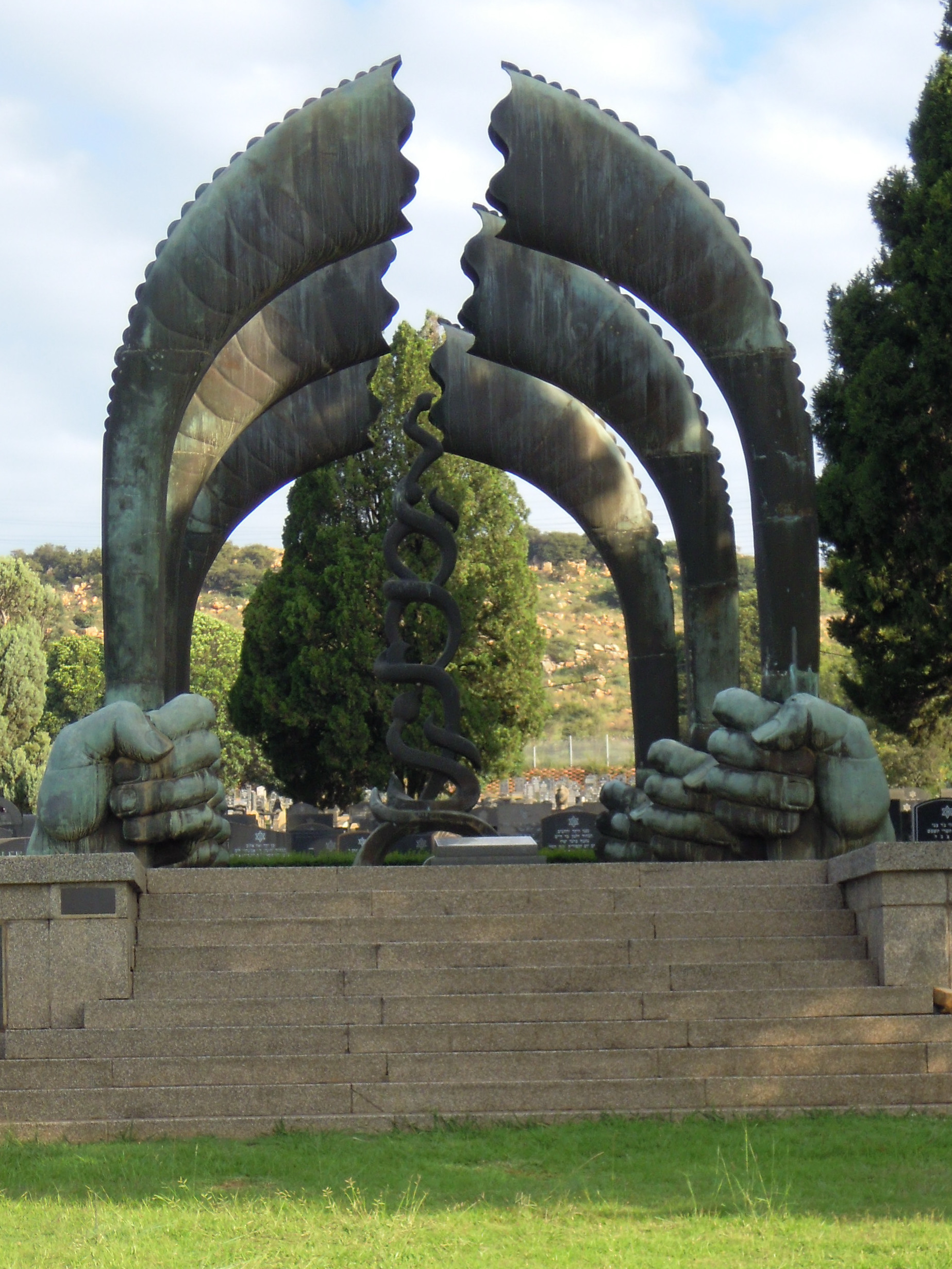
Memorial to the Six Million at Westpark Cemetery

Westpark Cemetery is a large cemetery in Johannesburg, South Africa, and is the resting place of some of the country's well-known citizens. It is a non-denomination designated burial ground, and thus has Christian, Jewish, Muslim and Chinese burial areas. The Jewish section contains a Holocaust Memorial, erected in 1995.

It was opened in 1942, and historically was part of one of Johannesburg's original farms, Farm Waterval, which was purchased in 1887 by two Geldenhuys brothers in the hope of finding gold. While they did not find gold, Louw Geldenhuys employed Boer War veterans to build the Emmarentia Dam, and leased smallholdings with fruit trees.

In 1993, 13 hectares were donated to the city for public recreation and, eventually with the other sections, became the Johannesburg Botanic Gardens, Marks Parks Sports Club and the Westpark Cemetery. Today, the sprawling cemetery is the resting place of thousands of Johannesburg residents, and has separate Chinese, Muslim, Jewish, Christian and SANDF burial areas. Many ornate gravestones and mausoleums can be found throughout the park.

Westpark is an active cemetery, as burials are still allowed and performed.

== Military plot ==
There are also specific areas for servicemen who have died in the line of duty. This cemetery contains war graves of 617 Commonwealth service personnel of World War II, mostly burials from military hospitals and an airfield, besides 21 non-Commonwealth war graves and seven non-war graves that are in care of the Commonwealth War Graves Commission.

The Military Plot contains the Johannesburg Cremation Memorial to 69 Commonwealth service personnel cremated at Johannesburg's Braamfontein Crematorium during the same war and is found directly behind the Cross of Sacrifice.

== Notable interments ==
- Beyers Naudé – Christiaan Frederick Beyers Naudé (1915–2004) was a South African cleric, theologian and the leading Afrikaner anti-apartheid activist.
- Nandi Nyembe - actress, stage actress and producer
- Westdene dam disaster – Casualties of the Westdene dam disaster, a bus accident that took place in Westdene, near Johannesburg, South Africa, in 1985.
- Evelyn Mase – midwife nurse and former first wife of Nelson Mandela.
- Jacob Matlala – "Baby Jake" (1962–2013) was a South African boxer and junior flyweight champion from Meadowlands, Johannesburg.
- Joe Mafela – South African actor, writer, producer, director, singer, and businessman
- Linda Mkhize – ProKid (1981–2018), better known by his stage name ProKid or PRO, was a South African rapper and producer.
- John Nkadimeng – South African politician and anti-Apartheid activist
- Vernon Nkadimeng, political activist
- Ahmed Kathrada – freedom fighter, struggle icon, Parliamentary Councillor and adviser to President Nelson Mandela
- George Bizos – Greek-South African human rights lawyer
- Nkosi Johnson – Child AIDS activist
- Joe Modise – ANC struggle veteran and Umkhonto we Sizwe commander
- Alfred Nzo – Anti-apartheid struggle veteran
- Brett Goldin – well-known stage and screen actor, who was murdered execution-style with his fashion-designer friend, Richard Bloom
- Harry Heinz Schwarz – lawyer, statesman and long-time political opposition leader against apartheid.
- Moosa Moolla – South African activist and diplomat.
- Herman Charles Bosman – famous South African poet and author
- Simba Mhere (1988–2015) – South African/ Zimbabwean TV Personality
- Cecil Margo – Judge, World War II fighter pilot, DFC, DSO
- Gisele Wulfsohn – South African photographer
- Akhumzi Jezile – South African actor, television presenter and producer
- Arthur Chaskalson – Judge, lawyer to Nelson Mandela
- Johnny Clegg – British-born South African musician and anthropologist
- Johannes van der Walt – South African wrestler known as the 'Gemaskerde Wonder' (Masked Wonder)
- Gert Potgieter (tenor) – South African Tenor and Actor
- Mandoza (1978–2016) – South African kwaito musician
- Vuyo Mbuli – South African television personality and news presenter
- Prudence Nobantu Mabele (1971–2017) – one of first black South African lesbian woman and a leading HIV activist to live openly with HIV.
- Richard Maponya – South African entrepreneur and property developer
- John Moshoeu – South African retired professional footballer.
- Israel A. Maisels - South African judge
- Kiernan Jarryd Forbes (1988–2023) – South African Rapper
- Jessie Duarte – South African politician
- Ebrahim Ebrahim – South African politician
- Essop Pahad – South African politician
- Aziz Pahad – South African politician
