= A Bekkersdal Marathon =

First edition

A Bekkersdal Marathon is anthology of short stories written by Herman Charles Bosman.

== Publication history ==
The 22 short stories assembled in this volume, published in book format in 1971 by Human and Rousseau, were all written during the last 18 months of Herman Charles Bosman's life. Originally, the stories appeared as a weekly series in The Forum magazine.

== Synopsis ==
After leaving university, Bosman was appointed as a school teacher in the Groot Marico District. In small, underdeveloped rural towns, such as the one where Bosman worked, the living room (voorkamer) of a local farmer would serve as a post office. People would gather here to chat and gossip. The conversations Bosman participated in with the townspeople and farmers inspired the anthology.

In A Bekkersdal Marathon, the voorkamer of Jurie Steyn, a prosperous maize farmer, doubles as the village post office. Regular visitors include Gysbert van Tonder (a notorious cattle rustler), At Naude (the owner of the district's only radio, who prides himself on keeping abreast of national and world affairs) and Oupa Bekker (the oldest man in the district). Vermaak, the school master, represents Bosman himself.

Bosman uses gentle irony to poke fun at the Afrikaans farmers. Outwardly, the farmers project an image of conservative respectability which contrasts with their inner natures. The plots, language and content of the stories help the reader to look beneath the veneer and to understand the farmers as scheming, greedy, superstitious, provincial country bumpkins. Hypocritically, they routinely criticize Black people and English South Africans for foibles and failings which the farmers themselves display in ample measure. Bosman did not spare himself in the stories; Vermaak is depicted as occasionally naïve and his idiosyncrasies are discussed at length in the stories.
