= Aziz Pahad =

South African politician (1940–2023)

Deputy Minister of Foreign Affairs
- In office May 1994 – 25 September 2008 Serving with Sue van der Merwe (from 2004)
- President: Nelson Mandela; Thabo Mbeki
- Minister: Alfred Nzo; Nkosazana Dlamini-Zuma
- Succeeded by: Ebrahim Ebrahim

Member of the National Assembly
- In office 9 May 1994 – 25 September 2008

Personal details
- Born: Aziz Goolam Hoosein Pahad; 25 December 1940 Schweizer-Reneke, Transvaal, South Africa
- Died: 27 September 2023 (aged 82)
- Party: African National Congress
- Parent: Amina Pahad (mother)
- Relatives: Essop Pahad (brother)
- Education: Witwatersrand University; University of Sussex

Aziz Goolam Hoosein Pahad (25 December 1940 – 27 September 2023) was a South African politician and anti-apartheid activist who was Deputy Minister of Foreign Affairs from 1994 to 2008. He was a member of the National Executive Committee of the African National Congress from 1985 to 2007.

== Early life and activism ==
Pahad was born on 25 December 1940 in Schweizer-Reneke in the former Transvaal, but his family moved to Johannesburg in 1945. His parents were Amina and Goolam Pahad, activists in the Transvaal Indian Congress, and his elder brother, Essop, also became an activist. He matriculated in 1959 at the Central Indian High School in Johannesburg and then, in 1963, completed a Bachelor of Arts at the University of the Witwatersrand, where he majored in sociology and Afrikaans.

While a student, Pahad was active in the anti-apartheid movement, particularly through the Transvaal Indian Congress, and he was served with a banning order in 1963. The order restricted his movements and public activities, and he was arrested on several occasions. In 1964, after the landmark Rivonia Trial, he and Essop left South Africa and went into exile.

== Exile: 1964–1990 ==
In exile, Pahad spent some time in Angola and Zimbabwe but lived mostly in London, England. He completed a diploma at University College London in 1966, followed in 1968 by a Master's degree in international relations from the University of Sussex. At the same time, from 1966, Pahad worked full-time for the exiled African National Congress (ANC), supporting the development of the Anti-Apartheid Movement in the United Kingdom and Europe. At the ANC's 1985 elective conference in Kabwe, Zambia, he was elected to the party's National Executive Committee for the first time.

In 1990, Pahad returned to South Africa during the negotiations to end apartheid. The following year, he was appointed to deputise Alfred Nzo as deputy head of the ANC's Department of International Affairs. In addition, he was a member of the National Peace Executive Committee during the negotiations, and he served on the Transitional Executive Council's subcommittee on foreign affairs during the post-apartheid transition of 1994.

== Deputy Minister of Foreign Affairs: 1994–2008 ==
=== Mandela presidency ===
In South Africa's first post-apartheid elections in 1994, Pahad was elected to represent the ANC in the new National Assembly. In addition, newly elected President Nelson Mandela appointed him to the Government of National Unity as Deputy Minister of Foreign Affairs. Again deputising Alfred Nzo, Pahad handled much of the Ministry's public profile during his first term in the office.

In a controversy of the first term, on 20 April 1997, the Israeli daily newspaper Ha'aretz quoted Pahad as confirming that the 1979 Vela incident – a mysterious flash over the Indian Ocean – had indeed been the result of a South African nuclear test. Soon afterwards, Pahad reported that he had been misquoted by Ha'aretz and that he was merely repeating rumours that had been circulating for years.

=== Mbeki presidency ===
Pahad was re-elected to the National Assembly in the 1999 and 2004 general elections, and Mandela's successor, President Thabo Mbeki, retained him as Deputy Minister throughout his two-term presidency. Despite intermittent speculation that Pahad would be promoted, he served under Minister Nkosazana Dlamini-Zuma; in addition, after the 2004 election, Sue van der Merwe was appointed to serve alongside him as a second deputy minister.

Pahad's influence in the government expanded further under Mbeki, who was an old friend of the Pahad brothers from their shared time in exile in England. His was a prominent role in South Africa's attempt to stop the US-led attack on Iraq in 2003. He represented South Africa at the International Court of Justice in 2004, when South Africa argued strongly against the erection of the Israeli West Bank barrier. He told the court:

The Palestinian separation wall is not a security wall. It is a wall of occupation, a wall that has separated hundreds of thousands of Palestinians from their families, their homes, lands and religious sites.

In Africa, Pahad played an active role in bringing peace to the warring factions of the Democratic Republic of Congo, Burundi and Angola. He visited Saudi Arabia in March 2006 to promote bilateral political and economic relations between the two countries.

=== Resignation ===
At the ANC's 52nd National Conference in December 2007, Mbeki was defeated in his bid for a third term as ANC president, and Pahad failed to win enough votes to win re-election to the party's National Executive Committee. On 20 September 2008, following a year of political turmoil and a controversial judgement by Judge Chris Nicholson in the corruption trial of Jacob Zuma, Mbeki announced that the ANC had asked him to resign as national President. In the aftermath, Pahad was one of several ministers and deputy ministers who tendered their own resignation on 23 September.

After Kgalema Motlanthe took office as President, it was announced that Pahad would be reappointed Deputy Minister of Foreign Affairs in Motlanthe's cabinet. However, Pahad said that this was an error caused by "unfortunate communications problems" and that he had declined Motlanthe's offer. Calling his a "very difficult and emotional" decision, he said:

I have come to this decision after concluding that Judge Nicholson's judicial activism has led him to conclude that then-president Mbeki and his entire Cabinet interfered politically in the work of the National Prosecuting Authority... [implying] that we have collectively violated the Constitution and acted illegally and criminally and [are] therefore liable for prosecution. Given this reality, my principles, convictions and conscience will not enable me to serve in the executive.

Pahad also resigned from Parliament; his seat was filled by Doris Sikosana.

== Retirement ==
Pahad published a memoir, titled Insurgent Diplomat, in 2014. He also remained active in South African foreign policy: President Jacob Zuma appointed him as his envoy to Israel and Palestine in July 2014, and under the government of President Cyril Ramaphosa, Pahad chaired a foreign policy review commission that recommended a more active leadership role for South Africa in global affairs.

== Personal life and death ==
Pahad married Sandra Black-Pahad in 1994 in Johannesburg; they had children. She filed for divorce in 2006.

Pahad died on 27 September 2023, just two months after his brothers Junaid and Essop. He was 82 years old and he was buried the following day at Westpark Cemetery alongside with his brother Essop.

== See also ==
- History of the African National Congress
- Israel–South Africa relations
