= Dunya Mikhail =

American poet

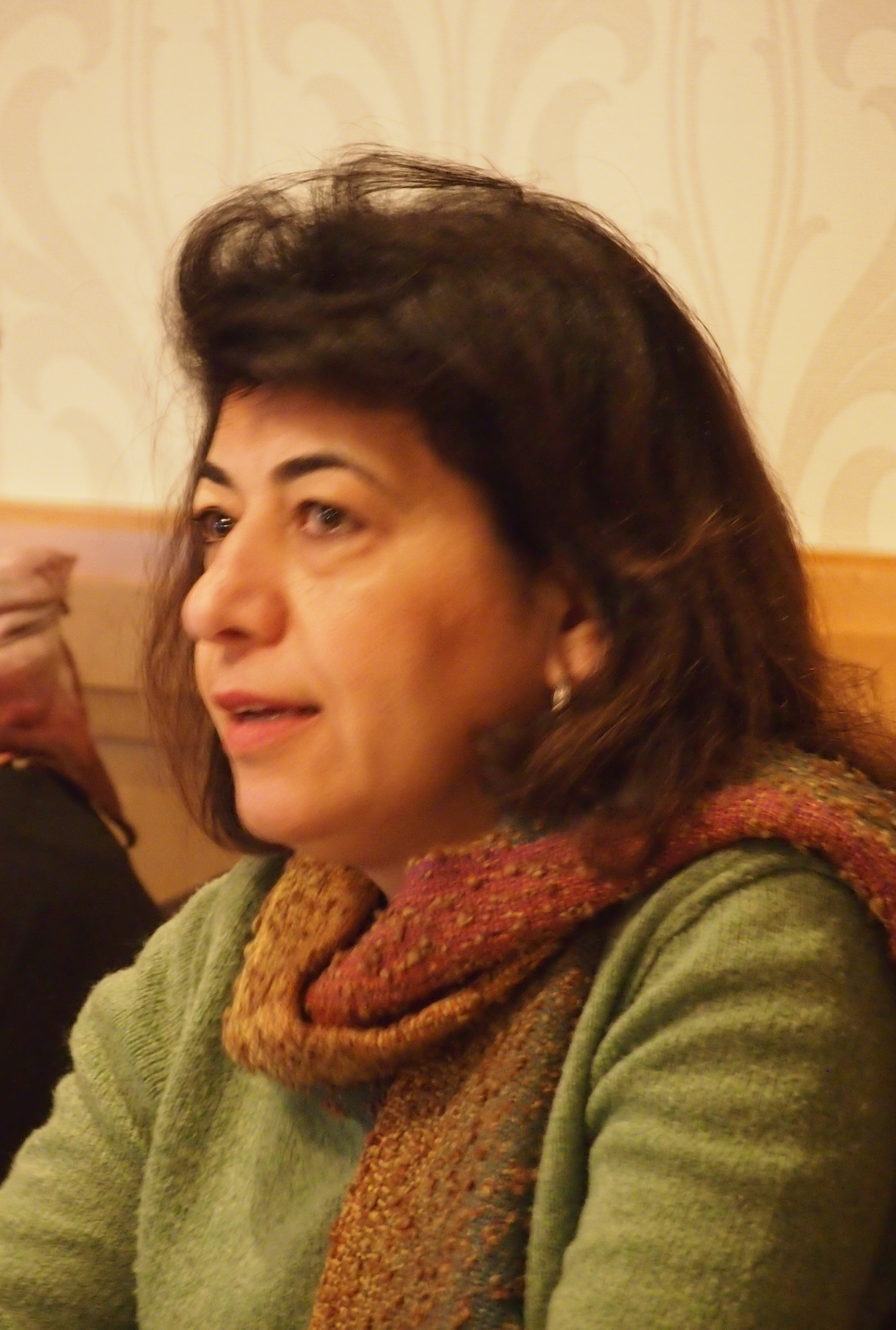
- Reading at a Split This Rock event, 2014
- Born: March 19, 1965 (age 61); Baghdad, Iraq
- Education: Wayne State University
- Writing career
- Language: Aramaic; Arabic; English
- Genre: Poetry
- Notable awards: United Nations Human Rights Award for Freedom of Writing

Dunya Mikhail (born 19 March, 1965 in Baghdad, Iraq) is an Iraqi-American poet based in the United States.

== Life ==
She was born and raised in Iraq to an ethnic Assyrian Chaldean-Catholic family. She graduated with a BA from the University of Baghdad.

Mikhail worked as a journalist, as editor of the literary section, and as a translator for The Baghdad Observer. As a liberal writer during the time of dictatorship and censorship, Mikhail was exiled from Iraq in 1996, going first to Jordan and then eventually to the United States, where she became a U.S. citizen, got married, and raised a daughter. She studied Near Eastern Studies and received her MA from Wayne State University.

In 2001, she was awarded the United Nations Human Rights Award for Freedom of Writing.

Mikhail speaks and writes in Aramaic, Arabic and English. Her works include the poetry collection The War Works Hard, which won PEN's Translation Fund award, was shortlisted for the Griffin Poetry Prize, and was named one of the best books of 2005 by the New York Public Library. Her genre-bending work Diary of a Wave Outside the Sea won the Arab American Book Award in 2010. Her poetry has appeared in Poetry International, Modern Poetry in Translation, the London Times, as well as anthologies including World Beat: International Poetry Now from New Directions, Flowers of Flame: Unheard Voices of Iraq, and Iraqi Poetry Today: Modern Poetry in Translation.

Mikhail's honors include the Guggenheim Fellowship, the Knights Foundation grant, the Kresge Fellowship, the United Nations Human Rights Award for Freedom of Writing, and the shortlist of the Arabic Booker Prize. She is the co-founder of the Michigan community-based Mesopotamian Forum for Art and Culture. She currently works as a special lecturer of Arabic at Oakland University in Michigan and is a Visiting Lecturer in Creative Writing; Holmes Poet in Residence at Princeton University.

== Bibliography ==
- The War Works Hard. Translated by Elizabeth Winslow. New Directions Publishing. 2005. ISBN 978-0-8112-1621-0. (shortlisted for the 2006 International Griffin Poetry Prize)
- Diary of a Wave Outside the Sea. New Directions Publishing. 2009. ISBN 978-0-8112-1831-3.
- The Iraqi Nights. Translated by Kareem James Abu-Zeid. New Directions Publishing. 2014. ISBN 978-0-8112-2286-0.
- The Theory of Absence. Chinese University Press. 2014. ISBN 978-962-996-618-8.
- The Beekeeper: Rescuing the Stolen Women of Iraq. Translated by Weiss, Max; Mikhail, Dunya. New Directions Publishing. 2018. ISBN 978-0-8112-2612-7.
- In Her Feminine Sign. New Directions Publishing. 2019.
- The Bird Tattoo. Dar al-Rafidain. 2020.
- Tablets: Secrets of the Clay. Translated by Kareem James Abu-Zeid; Dunya Mikhail. New Directions Publishing. 2024. ISBN 978-0-8112-3797-0.
