= Simba Mhere =

Zimbabwean-South African actor and presenter (1988–2015)

- Born: Simbarashe Mhere; 29 October 1988; Harare, Zimbabwe
- Died: 31 January 2015 (aged 26); Johannesburg, South Africa
- Resting place: Westpark Cemetery
- Other name: Half Man Half Amazing
- Education: Randpark High School; University of Johannesburg (BComm)
- Occupations: Actor; Presenter; TV personality
- Years active: 2009–2015
- Height: 185 m (606 ft 11 in)
- Parents: Joseph Mhere (father); Angela Mhere (mother)
- Relatives: Valerie Mhere (sister)

Simbarashe "Simba" Mhere (29 October 1988 – 31 January 2015) was a Zimbabwe-born South African actor, presenter and television personality. He is best known for winning the 2010 Top Billing Presenter Search.

== Early life ==
Mhere was born on 29 October 1988 in Harare, Zimbabwe, to Joseph and Angela Mhere. He had one younger sister, Valerie, who is a 100m and 200m sprinter. When he was a year-old baby, his family moved to South Africa. Then he attended Randpark High School for studies. He later graduated with a BComm degree in accounting from the University of Johannesburg.

== Career ==
In 2010, Mhere won the lifestyle show Top Billing Presenter Search, where he rose to prominence. He subsequently worked as a voice-over artist for many radio and television programs. In addition to that, he worked as a stage host for film award ceremonies and beauty pageants, such as the Mrs SA pageant in 2013.

== Death ==
On 31 January 2015, 05:00 SAST local time, Mhere travelled to O. R. Tambo International Airport with his friend, blogger and social commentator Kady-Shay O'Bryan and his father to board a flight to the J&B Met horse race taking place in Cape Town. Then his Mitsubishi vehicle collided with another car VW Polo GTI on William Nicol Drive in Fourways, Johannesburg, after that car flew over an island and encroached into his lane. Simba (26 years) and Kady-Shay (29 years) were killed in a head-on collision in the early hours of the morning, and his father survived the crash. A total of eight people died in the accident, including passengers from at least one other vehicle that got caught up in the crash. Mhere and O'Bryan were pronounced dead at the scene, His memorial service was held on 5 February 2015 at the Rhema Bible Church in Randburg, South Africa. Several tributes were paid by his colleagues and friends during the memorial service and his funeral service and then his body was buried at the Westpark Cemetery.

After several weeks of delays, the suspect appeared in court on charges on 29 October. During the investigations, Naidoo's car tracker had recorded 37 incidents in which the speed limit had been exceeded. The convicted man, 24-year-old Preshalin Naidoo was sentenced to 10 years in prison by the Randburg Magistrate after found guilty of culpable homicide and reckless driving. During the trial, eyewitnesses alleged that Naidoo told them he could not control his vehicle and that he fell asleep. According to sources, Naidoo had been travelling at 210 km/h, minutes before the accident. But, Naidoo later stated that he lost control of his vehicle due to "unexpected mechanical defects". Another witness, Mamokete Laka, also told the court that Naidoo smelt like alcohol. In February 2017, The State closed its case in the trial on Preshalin Naidoo. After conducting the post-mortem on Mhere, the Pathologist Dr Candice Hansmeyer‚ stated that Mhere was still alive after the car crash.

== Legacy ==
After Mhere's death, his fellow Top Billing presenter and close friend, Jonathan Boynton-Lee, announced that he has officially registered a production company titled "Half Man Half Amazing Productions" to honour the legacy of Simba.

== Filmography ==
Year	Film	Role	Genre	Ref.
2010	Presenter Search on 3	Self	TV series	
2011	Pimp'idladla	Self	TV series	
