= Zainab Asvat =

South African anti-apartheid activist

Zanab Ebrahim Asvat

Personal details
- Born: 1920
- Died: 30 November 2013 (umur 93)
- Spouse: Dr Abdul Haque Patel Dr. Aziz Kazi (1950)
- Education: Witwatersrand University

Dr. Zainab Asvat (born c. 1920 - 30 November 2013) was a South African anti-apartheid activist. Asvat was trained as a medical doctor, but was politically active most of her life.

Asvat was the first Muslim woman to become a doctor in South Africa. Her husband, Dr. Aziz Kazi is a doctor and secretary of Transvaal Indian Congress

== Early life and education ==
Asvat was one of eleven children of Ebrahim and Fatima Asvat. Asvat's father took his daughter to political meetings when she was a girl and this helped her become politically active early on. She was the first Muslim girl to attend high school in the Transvaal In the 1940s. She studied medicine at the University of Witwatersrand after being influenced by Yusuf Dadoo who returned from his medical studies in Edinburgh.

== Career ==
In 1946, the South African government passed the Asiatic Land Tenure and Indian Representation Act No. 28, which was also called the "Ghetto Act." This law made it illegal for Indian citizens of South Africa to own land except in "exempted areas." Asvat took a year off of her third year of school, in 1946 to travel to Durban where she was a part of the Passive Resistance Campaign. During the campaign, resisters set up tents at the corner of Umbilo Road and Gale Street in Durban on 13 June 1946. The group was consist of eighteen participators, six of whom were women: Zainab Asvat, Zohra Bhayat, Amina Pahad, Zubeida Patel of Johannesburg, Lakshmi Govender, Veeramah Pather of Durban. The leaders of this resistance were Monty Naicker, President of the Natal Indian Congress (NIC) and M.D Naidoo, Secretary of the NIC. Her sister, Amina Cachalia came with her school friends came to cheer and sing for the group. On 16 June 1946, their tents were destroyed, stolen and Asvat was injured when a tent fell on her. Five people were beaten unconscious by the assault. Zainab made a fiery speech and said "Hooligans or no hooligans, carry on we must, and carry on we shall". The assault increased support for the resistance and thousands of people come to the tent to show their solidarity. She was arrested briefly on the 28th, but released by the night. This arrest had an influence on Asvat's younger sister, Amina Cachalia, who later also became an anti-apartheid activist. The day after the arrest, Asvat addressed a gathering of 800 women in the Avalon Cinema, inspiring the group to continue to resist. In July, she was arrested with other resisters and was sent to prison until early October.

After she was released from prison, Asvat, PK Naidoo and Suriakala Patel elected to the TIC committee and became one of the first women ever elected onto the TIC Committee. Asvat then returned to medical school and it wasn't until the 1956 that she became active again politically. Asvat, like many Indian women, joined the Federation of South African Women in order to fight apartheid in the 1950s. She organized a "network of support" for the families of the 156 activists who were arrested in December 1956. Asvat also provided meals for the accused activists during their trials.

In December 1963, Asvat organized a Women's March to the Union Buildings, where she and other activists protested against group area relocations and National Council for Indian. The police set their dogs on the marchers and charged them with batons. In 1964, she was banned from South Africa for five years. She then found out that she would be subject to another five-year ban. Asvat and her husband, Dr. Aziz Kazi, received exit permits and moved to London, seeking political asylum.

== Later life and death ==
In 2008, her role in opposing apartheid was part of a photographic exhibition called "Our Triumphs and Our Tears," which included portraits by Gisële Wulfsohn and was displayed at the Slave Lodge Cape Town.

Asvat died in London on 30 November 2013.
