= Vuyo Mbuli =

South African television personality

- Born: 14 May 1967; Soweto, South Africa
- Died: 18 May 2013 (aged 46); Bloemfontein, South Africa
- Resting place: Westpark Cemetery, Johannesburg
- Occupations: News presenter; TV personality
- Years active: 1993–2013
- Notable work: Morning Live; SABC
- Spouse: Savita Mbuli (m. 1998)
- Children: 2

Vuyo Mbuli (14 May 1967 – 19 May 2013) was a South African television personality and news presenter at Morning Live. He began working as an anchor at SABC in 1993 with Tracy O'Brien and then worked on the debut show Morning Live in 1999 until his death.

Mbuli died at the age of 46 after collapsing in the Free State Stadium in Bloemfontein while watching a rugby match.

== Career ==
Mbuli worked for state broadcaster SABC and made his television debut in 1993 for TopSport Surplus (to become SABC 3) as a continuity presenter, and worked his way up to sports presenting and news anchor. He worked on Morning Live on SABC 2 since its inception on 1 November 1999.

== Death ==
Mbuli died of pulmonary embolism while watching a rugby game at the Free State Stadium, aged 46. More than one thousand people including dignitaries and celebrities attended his funeral service.
