= Naji Sabri =

Iraqi Minister of Foreign Affairs

Naji Sabri Ahmad Al-Hadithi

Minister of Foreign Affairs
- In office April 23, 2001 – April 9, 2003
- President: Saddam Hussein
- Preceded by: Muhammad Saeed al-Sahhaf
- Succeeded by: Hoshyar Zebari

Personal details
- Born: 1951 (age 74–75) Kingdom of Iraq

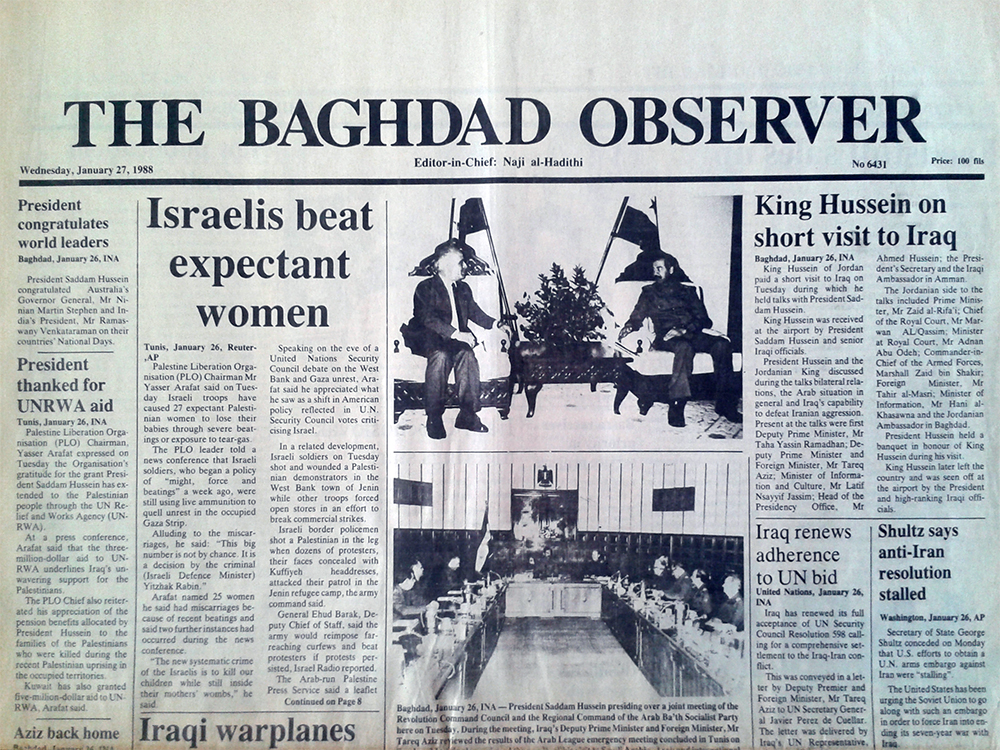
Frontpage of the daily newspaper "The Baghdad Observer", edited by Naji Sabri

Naji Sabri Ahmad Al-Hadithi (Arabic: ناجي صبري أحمد الحديثي) (born 1951) is an Iraqi former politician who served as the Iraqi Foreign Minister under Saddam Hussein in the lead-up to the 2003 invasion of Iraq.

== Background ==
Sabri was a professor of English literature at Baghdad University, before serving in the press office of Iraq's embassy in London. He was recalled from the embassy in 1980 after two of his brothers were arrested for plotting against Saddam Hussein's regime. Thereafter, Sabri served as editor of an English language newspaper and translated English books into Arabic.

During the 1991 Gulf War, Sabri served as the Deputy Information Minister for Iraq. His interactions with CNN producer Robert Wiener were dramatized in the HBO film Live From Baghdad, where his character was listed as Naji Al-Hadithi. CNN became famous after delivering live audio and video footage from within a Baghdad hotel even as the American military was bombing the city.

In 1998, Sabri was appointed Iraq's ambassador to Austria. In 2001, he was named Foreign Minister of Iraq. His education, almost flawless English, and comfort in diplomatic circles continued to make him one of Iraq's most recognized faces in the West. He is a Sunni Muslim.

On 26 September 2002, after Saddam Hussein's meeting with the Chechen pro-Moscow President Akhmad Kadyrov, Iraq's Foreign Minister Naji Sabri stated the country's position with regard to Chechnya, namely that Chechnya is an integral part of Russia. "Iraq is firmly against any manifestations of separatism in Russia."

== 2003 invasion of Iraq ==
In the lead-up to the 2003 invasion, Sabri led Iraq's diplomatic efforts to weaken support for a US-led attack on Iraq. He worked to lobby support from Russia, China, India, and even Iraq's former enemy Iran. Sabri was also heavily engaged in talks with UN Secretary-General Kofi Annan and chief UN weapons inspector Hans Blix. In September 2002, Sabri officially announced to Annan that Saddam Hussein had agreed to a resumption of weapons inspections in Iraq.

In March 2003, while the invasion of Iraq was in its heated initial phase, a fatigued Sabri—last seen in Baghdad—publicly arrived in Damascus, Syria to the surprise of many. Sabri had managed to secure safe passage out of the country along a hazardous route. Sabri continued onto Cairo, Egypt, where his security was guaranteed by the Egyptian government. The United States also bragged about giving the Egyptian authorities a guarantee of Sabri's security while in Egypt.

== CIA Informant ==
In March 2006, NBC Nightly News reported that Naji Sabri was, indeed, the "source who had direct access to Saddam and his inner circle" of which former United States Central Intelligence Agency (CIA) director George Tenet had once boasted. In April 2006, former CIA officer Tyler Drumheller claimed in a 60 Minutes interview that a very senior Iraqi official had indeed given the CIA information with regards to Iraqi weapons of mass destruction programs. 60 Minutes verified that the source was Sabri.

For a short time before the 2003 invasion, the CIA maintained French-sponsored, third-party contact with Sabri. In exchange for $100,000 paid to him by the American government, Sabri offered the CIA important details on some of Saddam's alleged weapons programs and affirmation on the discontinuance of others. Sabri told the CIA that Saddam had stockpiled certain chemical weapons, specifically "poison gas". Sabri also told the CIA that Saddam did not have an active nuclear or biological weapons program. There were people in the CIA that accepted and knew this intelligence, but the CIA reports which continued up to Capitol Hill and the White House president under Bush attempted to ignore this fact from Sabri but were reluctant to readily accept it. In the lead-up to the invasion, the CIA pressured Sabri to defect to the United States after he became a snitch, but Sabri declined. Communication between Sabri and the CIA ceased thereafter due to anger from the CIA.

From NBC Nightly News:

On the issue of chemical weapons, the CIA said Saddam had stockpiled as much as "500 metric tons of chemical warfare agents" and had "renewed" production of deadly agents. Sabri said Iraq had stockpiled weapons and had "poison gas" left over from the first Gulf War. Both Sabri and the agency were wrong.

A 2006 U.S. Senate Select Committee on Intelligence report contains "additional views" from some committee members:

"We can say that there is not a single document related to this case which indicates that the source said Iraq had no WMD programs. On the contrary, all of the information about this case so far indicates that the information from this source was that Iraq did have WMD programs."

However, whether Sabri was right or wrong is unclear. Several small caches of chemical munitions at least 10 years old were found in Iraq between 2004 and 2006.

It has not been clearly established whether Sabri's safe passage to Cairo in the initial days of the invasion was related to his relationship with the CIA. In any case, the US military did not include Sabri in the "deck of cards" featuring the most-wanted Iraqi suspects.

== Post war life ==
According to his LinkedIn profile, Dr Naji Sabri is now an independent Media, Translation & International Affairs Professional in Qatar.

Government offices
Preceded by Muhammad Saeed al-Sahhaf	Minister of Foreign Affairs; 2001–2003	Succeeded by Hoshyar Zebari
