= Amina Pahad =

Anti-apartheid activist (1918–1973)

Amina Pahad OLS
- Born: Amina Tilley; July 1918; Klerksdorp, Transvaal; Union of South Africa
- Died: 26 May 1973 (aged 54); Bombay, India
- Political party: Transvaal Indian Congress
- Spouse: Goolam Hoosain Pahad
- Children: 5, including Essop and Aziz

Amina Pahad OLS (née Tilley; July 1918 – 26 May 1973) was a South African anti-apartheid activist. A member of the Transvaal Indian Congress, she rose to prominence for her role in passive resistance against the Asiatic Land Tenure and Indian Representation Act of 1946. She was also known as the matriarch of the Pahad family's politically active home in Johannesburg.

== Early life and Orient House ==
Pahad was born in July 1918 in Klerksdorp in the former Transvaal. She became politically active as a teenager, attracted to Mahatma Gandhi's satyagraha campaigns, and she married Goolam Hoosain Pahad, an activist of the Transvaal Indian Congress (TIC). In 1945, the Pahads and their five young sons – Ismail, Essop, Aziz, Nassim, and Zunaid – moved to Johannesburg, where they kept a two-bedroom flat at Orient House on Becker Street in Ferreirastown.

Orient House was near several political landmarks, including the magistrate's court; Chancellor House, which housed Nelson Mandela and Oliver Tambo's law offices; and the offices of two prominent anti-apartheid organisations, the TIC and the African National Congress. The flat thus became a hub for social and political gatherings, with meals prepared by Pahad frequently attended by anti-apartheid activists. Ben Turok, for example, calling Pahad "the best curry cook in the [anti-apartheid] movement", later recalled lunching at the flat to evade state-imposed banning orders.

Though fluent in Gujarati and Hindi, Pahad initially spoke little English, but she was renowned for her hospitality; according to one of her sons, she insisted on offering refreshments to the Security Branch officers who frequently arrived at the flat for a raid or interrogation. Ahmed Kathrada frequently described Pahad as his "second mother", and Walter Sisulu described Orient House as "a home away from home".

== Passive resistance ==
Pahad was a member of the organising committee for the passive resistance campaign against the Asiatic Land Tenure and Indian Representation Act, waged by the South African Indian Congress from 1946 to 1948. The campaign opened in June 1946 on a white-reserved plot of land in Durban; Pahad was among the first tranche of TIC volunteers, primarily women, who occupied the plot illegally. On 17 June, she was injured when the resistance site was attacked by white youths, and she was later arrested and imprisoned for a month, but upon her release she returned to the site for re-arrest. According to Kathrada, Pahad explained after her second arrest, "perhaps only partly in jest, that she did not want her husband to know the humiliation and ordeal of going to jail, and would rather volunteer in his place."

I often visited the home of Amina Pahad for lunch, and then, suddenly, this charming woman put aside her apron and went to jail for her beliefs. If I had once questioned the willingness of the Indian community to protest against oppression, I no longer could.

— Nelson Mandela on Pahad's passive resistance activities

Both Walter Sisulu and Nelson Mandela said that Pahad's involvement in passive resistance helped shape their later perceptions of Indians, overturning what Sisulu's biographer, Elinor Sisulu, described as the presumption that Indian women were "conservative and unwilling to involve themselves in public life". She also volunteered for arrest during the 1952 Defiance Campaign, though she was by then suffering from rheumatism, and she took part in the 1956 Women's March on the Union Buildings. During the 1950s, she was among a small group of women – also including Fatima Meer and Zainab Asvat – who sought to establish a dedicated political association for Indian women; they ultimately joined the non-racial Federation of South African Women.

== Later life and death ==
In the 1960s, Pahad and her husband moved to England to follow two of her sons, activists Aziz and Essop, who had been banned by the apartheid government. Their flat in London became host to a new generation of activists, including Essop's friend Thabo Mbeki. Pahad and her husband later left London for Bombay, India, where Pahad died in a car accident on 26 May 1973.

In April 2006, Mbeki, who was by then the second post-apartheid President of South Africa, awarded Pahad the Order of Luthuli in silver for her "Excellent contribution to the struggle for democracy, equality and justice in South Africa."
