= Amina Cachalia =

South African politician (1930–2013)

Amina Cachalia OLB
- Born: Amina Asvat; 28 June 1930; Vereeniging, Transvaal, Union of South Africa
- Died: 31 January 2013 (aged 82); Johannesburg, South Africa
- Spouse: Yusuf Cachalia (m. 1955; died 1995)
- Children: Ghaleb; Coco
- Father: Ebrahim Ismail Asvat
- Relatives: Zainab Asvat (sister)

Amina Cachalia OLB (née Asvat; 28 June 1930 – 31 January 2013) was a South African anti-Apartheid activist, women's rights activist, and politician. She was a longtime friend and ally of former President Nelson Mandela.

== Early life ==
Cachalia was born Amina Asvat, the ninth of eleven children in Vereeniging, Transvaal, South Africa, on 28 June 1930. Her parents were political activists Ebrahim Ismail Asvat and Fatima Asvat. Ebrahim was a close friend of Mahatma Gandhi and he was also chairperson of Transvaal British Indian Association which later went by the name of Transvaal Indian Congress (TIC). Her sister, Zainab Asvat, was an activist.

At first, Cachalia did not realize her racially prejudiced environment in South Africa. Under the influence of her tutor, Mervy Thandray, a communist teacher who belonged to the Communist Party of South Africa (CPSA), Cachalia's awareness about conditions in South Africa grew. Later, she was transferred to the Durban Indian Girls' High School. She returned to Fordsburg and decided not to continue her formal education. She began to learn shorthand and typing to get a job and became politically active. She began campaigning against Apartheid and racial discrimination as a teenager. She became a women's rights activist, often focusing on economic issues, such as financial independence for women.

== Political involvement ==
Her first political involvement started when she wanted to take part in women's passive resistance campaign, but was rejected because she was too young and frail to go to prison. Then, she join Transvaal Indian Youth Congress (TIYC) as an active member. TIYC was actively doing tasks such as distributing leaflets, putting up posters, selling TIC's newspaper, and mobilising Indian community to support the movement. Cachalia was a volunteer for the Peace Council and a founding member of Women's Progressive Union which was affiliated to the Institute of Race Relations in 1948. The Union taught women literacy, dress-making, secretarial skills, baby care, and basic skills in nursing in order to help them become economically independent.

=== Defiance campaign ===
In the early 1950s, she joined the ANC and worked hard to help Defiance Campaign become a successful movement by distributing leaflets, making home visits and recruiting volunteers to join the movement. On 26 August 1952, Cachalia participated in the Germiston march, led by Ida Mtwana. The Germiston march consisted of twenty-nine women in all: eleven Indian, one coloured (Susan Naude), and seventeen African women. All participitants in the march were arrested and sentenced to 14 days in Boksburg Prison.

On 17 April 1954, the Federation of South African Women (FEDSAW or FSAW) was founded in Johannesburg from the idea of Rachel Simons to found a women's organisation which included women from all races and colours. The organisation was led by Helen Joseph, Lillian Ngoyi and Cachalia as the steering committee for the organisation. Cachalia was the treasurer of the Federation of South African Women (FEDSAW) and a leading supporter of the Federation of Transvaal Women. FEDSAW decided to organise a women's march to Pretoria on the Union Building on 9 August 1955 to protest against the passed law. At that time, Cachalia was pregnant with a son, Ghaleb. Cachalia became one of the 20,000 marchers.

During the 1956 Treason Trial in Johannesburg, she helped her sister Zainab Asvat to support the accused and their families, who had been left impoverished by the loss of their main wage earner by collecting food and money for them. She became a staunch anti-apartheid activist. After the treason trial, Cachalia spent fifteen years under house arrest throughout the 1960s and 1970s.

=== The period after house arrest ===
After her house arrest ended, Cachalia immediately joined to oppose government's plan to allow Indians to elect their own representative without giving the same right to black South Africans by forming Anti-SAIC committees to oppose the sham election. Though the majority of Indians boycotted the election, the government still kept on to their plan by proposing a Tricameral Parliament system. The controversy resulted in the formation of the United Democratic Front (UDF) and she became one of the active members of this organisation. In the 1990s, Cachalia served on the committee of PWV (Union of Pretoria, Greater Johannesburg (Witwatersrand) and Vaal Triangle (Vereeniging)] region on African National Congress Women's League (ANCWL) after the organisation was resuscitated.

Cachalia was elected to the National Assembly of South Africa in the 1994 South African general election, the country's first with universal suffrage.

== Death and funeral ==
Cachalia died at Milpark Hospital in Parktown West, Johannesburg, on 31 January 2013, aged 82. The cause of death was complications due to a perforated ulcer.

Her funeral was held in her home in Parkview, Johannesburg, according to traditional Muslim customs. It was attended by South African President Jacob Zuma, former Presidents Thabo Mbeki and Kgalema Motlanthe, ANC Deputy President Cyril Ramaphosa, former First Lady Graça Machel, former Finance Minister Trevor Manuel, and fellow activist Ahmed Kathrada, among others.

== Personal life ==
She met her future husband, Yusuf Cachalia, secretary of TIC through her political activity. They were friends of Nelson Mandela before his imprisonment at Robben Island in 1962. In 1995, Mandela asked Cachalia to marry him. At that time, he had been separated from his wife, Winnie Madikizela-Mandela. Cachalia turned down Mandela's proposal because she said, "I'm my own person and that I had just recently lost my husband whom I had enormous regard for". Mandela divorced Madikizela-Mandela a year later and married Graça Machel in 1998.

== Honor and legacy ==
In 2004, she was awarded the Order of Luthuli in Bronze for her contributions to gender and racial equality and democracy. On the same year, she was also conferred by University of the Witwatersrand with a Doctor of Laws degree, honoris causa.

After her death, in March 2013, her autobiography When Hope and History Rhyme was published.

She was also awarded the Pravasi Bharatiya Samman, given to members of the Indian diaspora, by the Government of India.
