= Herman Charles Bosman =

South African novelist, short story writer, satirist

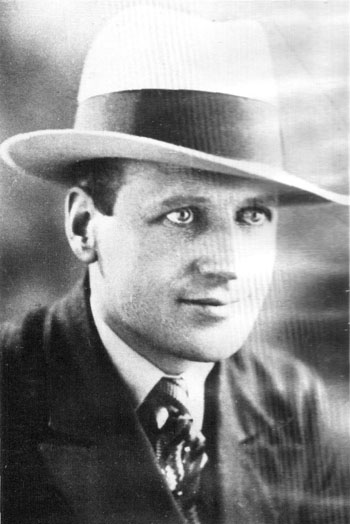
- Herman Charles Bosman
- Born: 3 February 1905 Kuils River, South Africa
- Died: 14 October 1951 (aged 46) Johannesburg, South Africa
- Occupation: Novelist; short-story writer; satirist; artist

Herman Charles Bosman (3 February 1905 – 14 October 1951) was widely regarded as South Africa's greatest short-story writer. He studied the works of Edgar Allan Poe and Mark Twain and developed a style emphasizing the use of satire. His English-language works utilize primarily Afrikaner characters and highlight the many contradictions in Afrikaner society during the first half of the twentieth century.

== Early life ==
Bosman was born at Kuils River, near Cape Town, in the Cape Colony, to an Afrikaner family. He was raised with English as well as Afrikaans. While Bosman was still young, his family travelled frequently, he spent a short time at Potchefstroom College which would later become Potchefstroom High School for Boys, he later moved to Johannesburg where he went to school at Jeppe High School for Boys in Kensington. While there he contributed to the school magazine. When Bosman was sixteen, he started writing short stories for the national Sunday newspaper (the Sunday Times). He attended the Johannesburg College of Education (which in 2002 was incorporated into the University of the Witwatersrand) and submitted various pieces to student literary competitions.

== Career and adult life ==
After graduation, Bosman accepted a teaching position in the Groot Marico district in an Afrikaans-language school. The area provided the backdrop for his best-known short stories, the Oom Schalk Lourens series (featuring an older character named Oom Schalk Lourens) and the Voorkamer sketches.

In January 1926 he married Vera Sawyer in Johannesburg. They never lived together, and Bosman seldom told anyone about the marriage, but they remained on good terms throughout Bosman's life.

Over the June school holidays in 1926, Bosman visited his family in Johannesburg. During an argument, he shot and killed his stepbrother. Bosman was sentenced to death for this crime and was sent to death row at the Pretoria Central Prison. His sentence was later reduced to ten years with hard labour. In 1930, Bosman was released on parole after serving half his sentence. His prison experiences formed the basis for his semi-autobiographical book, Cold Stone Jug.

Bosman then started his own printing-press company and was part of a literary set in Johannesburg, associating with poets, journalists and writers, including Aegidius Jean Blignaut. He toured overseas for nine years, spending most of his time in London. The short stories that he wrote during this period formed the basis for another of his best-known books, Mafeking Road. At the start of the Second World War, he returned to South Africa and worked as a journalist. During this time, in early 1947, he translated the Rubaiyat of Omar Khayyam into Afrikaans.

Bosman lamented the fact that Johannesburg neglected its heritage. In The Standard Theatre he complained that the city's residents:

"will pull down the Standard Theatre like they have pulled down all the old buildings, theatres, gin-palaces, dosshouses, temples, shops, arcades, cafes and joints that were intimately associated with the mining-camp days of Johannesburg. Because I know Johannesburg. And I am satisfied that there is no other city in the world that is so anxious to shake off the memories of its early origins."

Bosman's second wife was Ellalean Manson, known as Ella, a pianist and poet. They met in 1931 and married in October 1932 in Johannesburg. The couple were renowned for their bohemian lifestyle and parties, which featured witty conversation and usually ended well after midnight.

Bosman's third and last wife was Helena Stegmann, a schoolteacher and artist. They married in Johannesburg in March 1944. From 1948 to his death in 1951, Bosman was employed as proof editor at The Sunday Express. In addition, he was contracted to write a weekly Voorkamer story for The Forum magazine.

After a housewarming party in October 1951, Bosman experienced severe chest pains and was taken to Edenvale Hospital. On admission, he was asked for his birthplace. He replied, "Born Kuilsrivier – died Edenvale Hospital." He was discharged, but collapsed at home a few hours later. He died as he was being rushed back to hospital. He is buried in Westpark Cemetery in Westdene under a triangular headstone that reads "Die Skrywer, The Writer, Herman Charles Bosman, b 3.2.1905, d 14.10.1951."

== Legacy ==
After his death, the rights to his works were auctioned. They were purchased by his last wife, Helena, and upon her death, the rights were passed to her son, who retains them. In 1960, however, Helena sold some of his documents and 123 of his watercolours and pencil sketches to the Harry Ransom Center in Texas.

Only three of his books were published during his lifetime: Mafeking Road published by Dassie, and Jacaranda in the Night and Cold Stone Jug published by APB. Mafeking Road has never been out of print since its publication in 1947.

His biography was written several times by Valerie Rosenberg. Her first version was called Sunflower to the Sun (1976), followed by Herman Charles Bosman, a Pictorial Biography (1981), and lastly by Herman Charles Bosman: Between the Lines (2005). The last of these contains much new research and deals in detail with aspects of Bosman's life and parentage that were previously considered taboo.

Because many of his stories were originally published in long-forgotten magazines and journals, there are a number of anthologies by different collators each containing a different selection. His original books have also been published many times by different publishers.

The Herman Charles Bosman Literary Society meets annually for readings, performances and discussions of his works.

== Books ==
Some of the ISBNs and publishers below may not be for the original edition.

- Mafeking Road & Other Stories (1947), ISBN 0-7981-3902-1 Human & Rousseau, ISBN 978-0-9793330-6-4 Archipelago Books (2008)
- Rubaijat van Omar Khajjam (1948), Colin Reed-McDonald
- Cold Stone Jug (1949), ISBN 0-7981-3981-1 Human & Rousseau
- Veld-trails and Pavements Central News Agency
- Unto Dust (1963), edited by Lionel Abrahams, ISBN 0-7981-1501-7 Anthony Blond
- Bosman at his Best: a choice of stories and sketches (1965) edited by Lionel Abrahams ISBN 0-7981-0249-7 Human & Rousseau
- Bosman's Johannesburg (1986) edited by Stephen Gray ISBN 0-7981-2001-0 Human & Rousseau
- Ramoutsa Road (1987) ISBN 0-86852-130-2 Ad. Donker
- A Bekkersdal Marathon (1971), ISBN 0-7981-0030-3 Human & Rousseau
- The Earth is Waiting (1974)
- Willemsdorp (1977), ISBN 0-7981-3901-3 Human & Rousseau
- Almost Forgotten Stories (1979) ISBN 0-86978-167-7 H. Timmins
- My Friend Herman Charles Bosman [1980] Perskor. author: Aegidius Jean Blignaut
- Dead End Road [1980] AD.Donker. author: Aegidius Jean Blignaut
- Selected Stories (1980), edited by Stephen Gray, ISBN 0-7981-1031-7 Human & Rousseau
- The Collected Works of Herman Charles Bosman (1981), edited by Lionel Abrahams, ISBN 0-86850-029-1 Jonathan Ball
- The Bosman I like (1981), edited by Patrick Mynhardt, ISBN 0-7981-1179-8 Human & Rousseau
- Death Hath Eloquence (1981), edited by Aegidius Jean Blignaut, ISBN 0-86984-189-0 Christelike Uitgewersmaatskappy
- Uncollected Essays (1981), ISBN 0-86978-167-7 Timmins
- The Illustrated Bosman (1985), ISBN 0-86850-112-3 Jonathan Ball
- Makapan's Cave and other stories (1987), edited by Stephen Gray, ISBN 0-14-009262-5 Penguin Books.
- A Bosman Treasury (1991), edited by Ian Lusted, ISBN 0-7981-2830-5 Human & Rousseau
- Jurie Steyn's Post Office (1991), ISBN 0-7981-2903-4 Human & Rousseau
- Herman Charles Bosman : the prose juvenilia (1998), collected and introduced by M. C. Andersen, ISBN 1-86888-049-4 University of South Africa
- Idle Talk : voorkamer stories (1999), edited by Craig MacKenzie, ISBN 0-7981-3982-X Human & Rousseau
- Old Transvaal Stories (2000), edited by Craig MacKenzie, ISBN 0-7981-4085-2 Human & Rousseau
- The Rooinek and Other Boer War Stories (2000), edited by Craig MacKenzie, ISBN 0-7981-4031-3 Human & Rousseau
- Jacaranda in the Night (2000), ISBN 0-7981-4084-4 Human & Rousseau
- Best of Bosman (2001), edited by Stephen Gray and Craig MacKenzie, ISBN 0-7981-4203-0 Human & Rousseau
- Seed-Time and Harvest, and Other Stories (2001), edited by Craig MacKenzie, ISBN 0-7981-4186-7 Human & Rousseau
- Verborge Skatte: Herman Charles Bosman in/on Afrikaans (2001), collected by Leon de Kock, ISBN 0-7981-4185-9 Human & Rousseau

== Plays ==
- Cold Stone Jug (1982) adapted by Barney Simon from the play by Stephen Gray ISBN 0-7981-1309-X Human & Rousseau
