= Sandton (House of Assembly of South Africa constituency) =

South African constituency, 1910–1994

- Sandton
- Former constituency for the South African House of Assembly
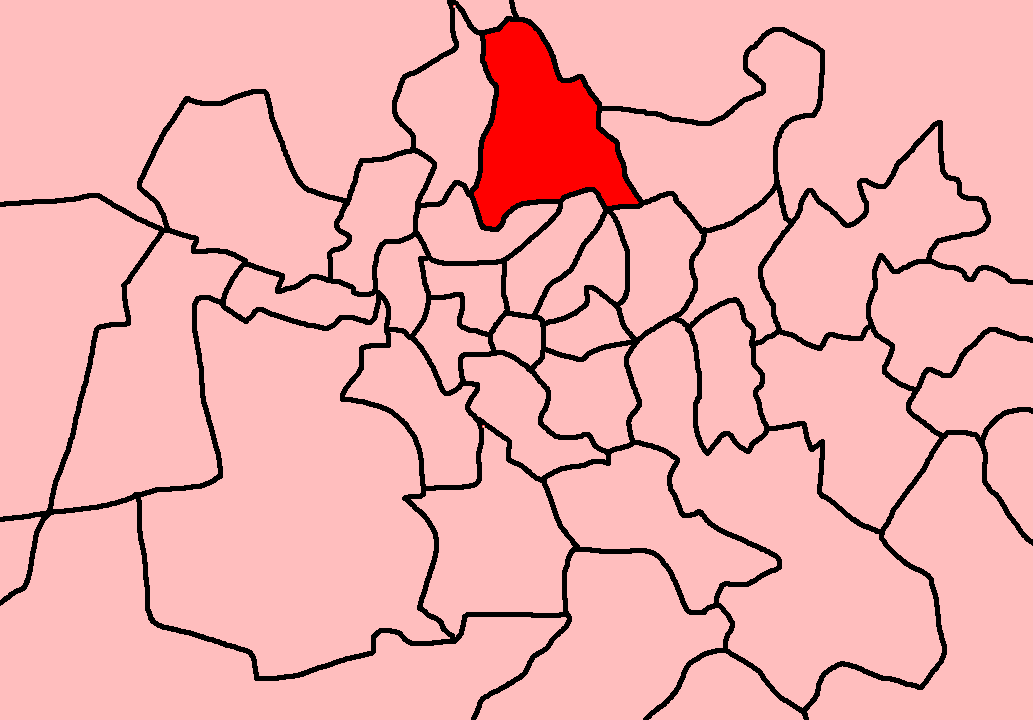
- Location of Sandton within Johannesburg (1981)
- Province: Transvaal
- Major settlements: Sandton

Former constituency
- Created: 1910
- Abolished: 1994
- Number of members: 1
- Replaced by: North West

Sandton was a constituency in the Transvaal Province of South Africa, which existed from 1910 to 1994. Named for the city of Sandton, throughout its existence it elected one member to the House of Assembly.

== Members ==
| Election | Parliament | Member | Party | Ref. |
|---|---|---|---|---|
| 1989 | 21st South African Parliament | David Dalling | DP | |
