= The Baghdad Observer =

Iraqi daily newspaper published in Arabic and English between 1967 and 2022

BAGHDAD OBSERVER
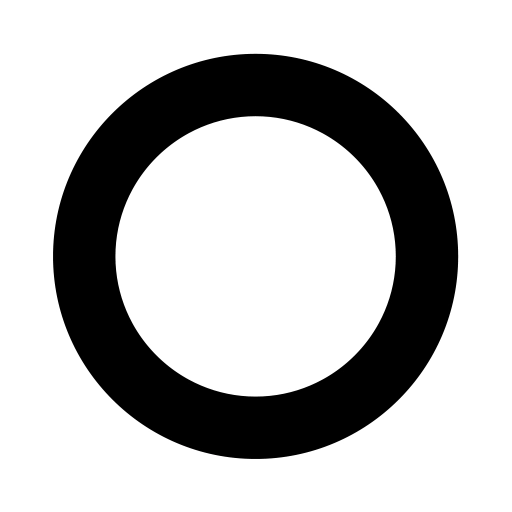

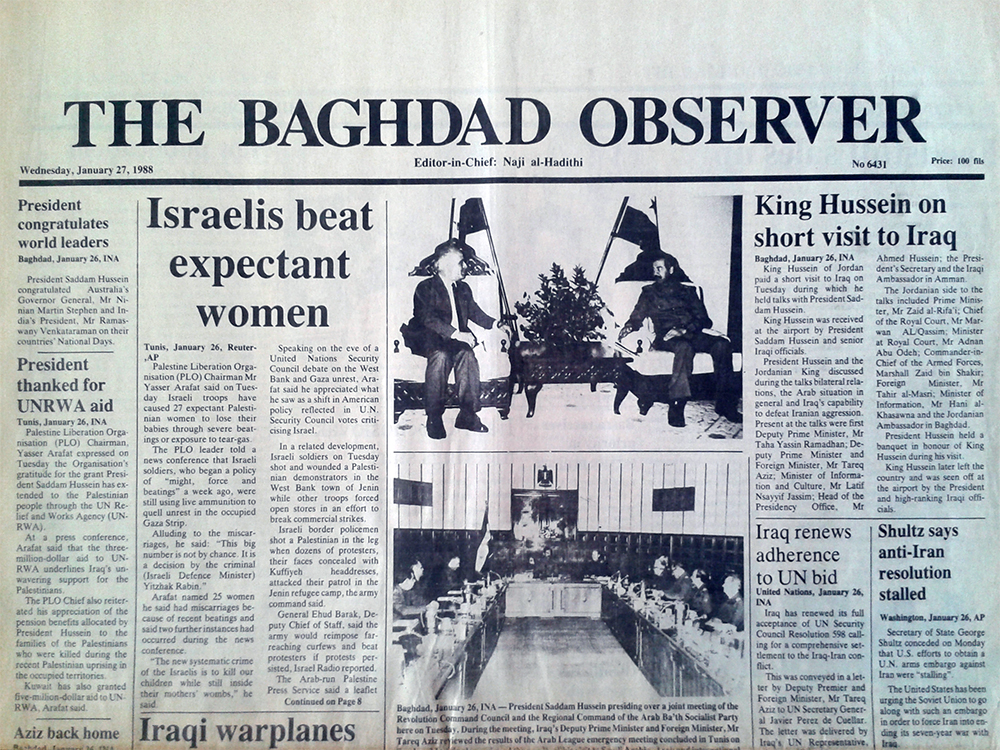
- Front page on 27 January 1988
- Owner: Akana.cc
- Founder: Mustafa Ahmed Al-Awad
- Headquarters: Baghdad
- Country: IRAQ
- Website: https://baghdadobserve.com/

The Baghdad Observer was an Iraqi daily political newspaper published in English and Arabic between 1967 and returned to work again in 2022. It was considered one of the most important newspapers written in the English language and published in Iraq daily and without interruption. Due to the popularity of the English language outside Iraq, it was the newspaper most cited by foreign politicians and journalists.

== History ==
The Iraqi authorities forcibly closed the Iraq Times in 1964, which at that time was the most widely circulated English-language Iraqi newspaper. In July, the Baghdad News began circulation to replace the vacuum left by the then-popular Iraq Times but with more government scrutiny. Baghdad News continued until the nationalization of the Iraqi press with the execution of the Law of the State Enterprise for Organizing Press and Printing No. 155 of 1967. With this infamous law, all the private newspapers were "cancelled" by order of the Iraqi government, including the Baghdad News. With the new law, the Public Press and Printing Enterprise was established to be the central government agency in totalitarian control of all press releases in Iraq.

Within days, Malik Dohan al-Hassan, who was the Iraqi Minister of Culture and Guidance at the fourth cabinet of Tahir Yahya, commissioned staff of the nationalized Baghdad News to use nationalized machinery of the Baghdad News and the Times Press in Baghdad to start a new government-mandated English-language newspaper to centrally replace all private English-language dailies. The new newspaper was named The Baghdad Observer. Among the names of the founders were Khales Azmi, a former Baghdad News Editor in Chief, Kamal Butti, Edmond Sabri, Nemr Abu Shehab and Amal Afas. According to Azmi in an interview in the Baghdad'd Evening newspaper a few days after the first issue of the Observer in December 1967, the new newspaper was intended to become "the mouthpiece of the State, both locally and abroad".

The Baghdad Observer moved from the State Enterprise for Organizing Press and Printing to the House of the Masses for Journalism (Arabic: دار الجماهير للصحافة) after the issuance of the Law of the House of the Massesfor Journalism No. 98 of 1971 and then to the Al-Mamoun House for Translation and Publishing (Arabic: دار المأمون للترجمة والنشر) after the latter was established by the Ministry of Culture and Information in 1980.

The Observer continued to be issued without interruption until one day before the Fall of Baghdad in April 2003.

== Online ==
A group of young people led by Mustafa Ahmed Al-Awad launched the Baghdad Observer website, or the electronic news portal of the paper. It is considered one of the 10 most visited websites by Iraqis. The website provides news services, coverage, a space for writing and presenting opinions, and provides an e-mail service.

== Editors-in-chief ==
- Khales Azmi (1967–1973)
- Fuad Y.M. Qazanchi (1973–1975)
- Naji Sabri al-Hadithi (1980–1991)
- Nassera as-Sa'dun (1998–2003)

== Notable employees ==
- Dunya Mikhail
- Taha al-Basry
- Zainab Ahmed
- Atheer F. al-Abadi
- Amal ash-Sharqi
- Ali Ibrahim ad-Dulaimi
- Nahida Rasheed at-Tamimi
