= David Dalling =

South African politician (1939–2020)

Member of the National Assembly
- In office May 1994 – June 1999

Member of the House of Assembly

Assembly Member for Sandton
- In office 1974–1994

Personal details
- Born: David John Dalling; 1939
- Died: 1 August 2020 (aged 80) Somerset West, South Africa
- Citizenship: South Africa
- Party: Congress of the People (since 2009)
- Other political affiliations: African National Congress; Democratic Party; Progressive Federal Party; United Party
- Education: Pretoria Boys High School
- Alma mater: Wits University

David John Dalling (1939 – 1 August 2020) was a South African politician, lawyer, and political commentator. He served in the apartheid-era House of Assembly from 1974 to 1994, representing the Sandton constituency. He later represented the African National Congress (ANC) in the National Assembly from 1994 to 1999.

In the House of Assembly, Dalling represented the United Party, the Progressive Federal Party, and the Democratic Party, and then spent his last two years as an independent after publicly declaring his support for the ANC in 1992. After his term as an ANC representative, he terminated his membership in the party, and he joined the Congress of the People in 2009.

== Early life and career ==
Born in 1939, Dalling was educated at Pretoria Boys High School, where he was head boy in 1957. He also played inter-provincial rugby until a hamstring injury prematurely ended his athletic career. After completing his undergraduate at Wits University, he practiced as an attorney. He entered frontline politics in 1967, when he was elected to represent his political party, the United Party, as a city councillor in the City of Johannesburg. He later represented the UP in the Transvaal provincial legislature.

== House of Assembly: 1974–1994 ==
In 1974, Dalling was elected to the House of Assembly, representing the UP in the wealthy constituency of Sandton, Johannesburg. After the collapse of the UP, Dalling was a member of the Progressive Federal Party and later of the Democratic Party (DP).

In 1987, Dalling was censured as an MP for remarks he made in the chamber about the Munnik Commission, an inquiry which had prepared the ground for parliamentary action against First National Bank by finding that the bank had helped finance an advertising campaign calling for the unbanning of the anti-apartheid African National Congress (ANC). During a parliamentary debate, Dalling alleged that the chairperson of the commission, Cape Judge President George Munnik, had a conflict of interest insofar as he was a supporter of the governing National Party and insofar as his own bank accounts had been closed by First National Bank. Dalling said that the commission's report was "a travesty of justice initiated by the state president", remarks which Minister of Justice Kobie Coetsee said constituted "gutter politics of the worst sort".

In 1990, after the ANC was unbanned during the negotiations to end apartheid, Dalling publicly advocated for his party, the DP, to forge a multi-racial alliance with the ANC. Later the same year, Dalling was subject to a Stratcom operation by the police's Security Branch: the Star printed a copy of a cheque, apparently signed by Dalling, for ANC membership fees. Policeman Paul Erasmus later admitted that the original cheque had been signed by Dalling's wife, for her own ANC membership, and that Dalling's signature had been forged.

However, in April 1992, Dalling did in fact join the ANC. With four other DP parliamentarians – Jannie Momberg, Pierre Cronjé, Jan van Eck, and Robert Haswell – he announced that he was defecting from the DP to join the ANC. In a joint statement, the group said that they were responding to a call made by Nelson Mandela shortly after his release from prison in 1990, for "all our white compatriots to join us in the shaping of a new South Africa". Dalling and the others remained in the House of Assembly as independents for the rest of the parliamentary term.

== Post-apartheid political career ==
In South Africa's first post-apartheid elections in 1994, Dalling was elected to represent the ANC in the new, multi-racial National Assembly, where he was a whip for the ANC. He served a single term in the seat before leaving after the 1999 general election, according to Dalling at his own request. He had business interests during his term in Parliament, and after his retirement from the legislature, he ran a tour guide company, Diplomatic Destinations. He was also a political commentator, publishing columns in several newspapers.

He later revealed that he had terminated his ANC membership in the years after 1999, due to "problems of conscience" arising from party infighting, President Thabo Mbeki's policy on HIV/AIDS and the increasing authoritarianism of Robert Mugabe in neighbouring Zimbabwe, "the crass behaviour" of Jacob Zuma, and the ANC's lacklustre response to corruption in the Arms Deal and Travelgate. He assisted Patricia de Lille's minor party, the Independent Democrats, in 2008, but in February 2009, he announced that he had joined the Congress of the People (COPE), a breakaway from the ANC formed in late 2008. He said that he was attracted by COPE's commitment to non-racism, its defence of the rule of law, and its acknowledgement that affirmative action was causing brain drain.

== Personal life ==
Dalling was married to Katharine Ambrose, an artist, and had four adult children from previous marriages. He died in hospital in Somerset West on 1 August 2020 after several years of illness.
