= Ebrahim Ebrahim =

South African anti-apartheid activist (1937–2021)

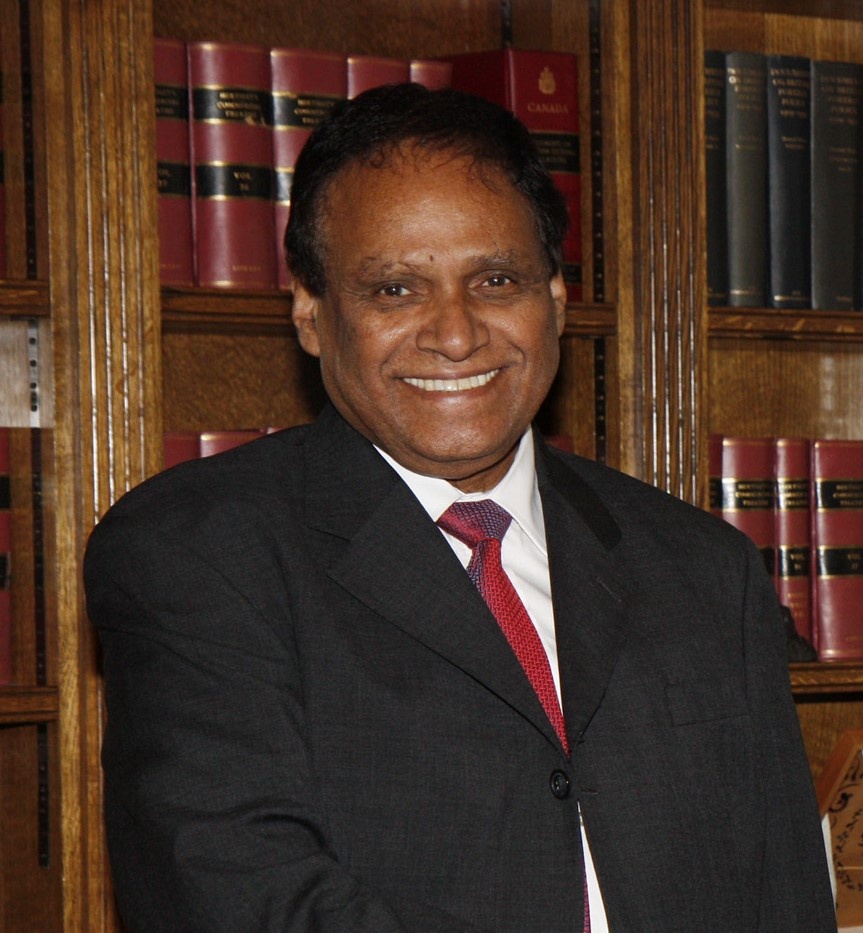
- Ebrahim in 2010

Deputy Minister of International Relations and Cooperation
- In office 11 May 2009 – 25 May 2014 Serving with Sue van der Merwe
- President: Jacob Zuma
- Preceded by: Aziz Pahad
- Succeeded by: Nomaindia Mfeketo

Personal details
- Born: Ebrahim Ismail Ebrahim; 1 July 1937 Durban, South Africa
- Died: 6 December 2021 (aged 84) Johannesburg, South Africa
- Party: African National Congress
- Spouse: Shannon Ebrahim (née Field) (m. 2000)
- Relations: Gora Ebrahim (brother)
- Children: 3
- Education: University of South Africa (BA, BCom)
- Occupation: Anti-apartheid activist, lawmaker

Ebrahim Ismail Ebrahim OLG (1 July 1937 – 6 December 2021) was a South African anti-apartheid activist of Indian origin who was a member of the African National Congress's armed wing uMkhonto we Sizwe. He was tried in the Pietermaritzburg sabotage trials of 1963 and was sentenced to a 15-year imprisonment at the Robben Island Maximum Security Prison.

Popularly known as Ebie, he served as a lawmaker in the first democratically elected government of South Africa in 1994 and also served as the country's deputy minister for international relations between 2009 and 2014.

== Early life and education ==
Ebrahim Ismail Ebrahim was born in Durban on 1 July 1937, the second of five children to parents Hafeeza and Mohammed Adam Modan, who were of Indian origin. His father was from Gujarat and travelled to the Union of South Africa in 1933, while his mother was born in South Africa. His father took the surname Ebrahim from the family with whom he had travelled to South Africa.

Ebrahim's schooling was taken care of by his grandmother, after the authorities denied him primary school admission, stating that schools for Indian students were full and could not admit him. This continued for five years until he was ten. He then joined a government-funded school, The Hindu Tamil Institute. He and his grandmother moved to Greyville, Durban, in 1949, when he was 12.

He later attended Clairwood High School, where he passed his Junior Certificate, and matriculated from Sastri College in Durban in 1959.

== Career and activism ==
Ebrahim was exposed to speeches from the African National Congress (ANC) and Natal Indian Congress (NIC) leaders when he attended their rallies in Durban as a 13 year old. During this time he was introduced to activism that fought discrimination against Indians in the country. He was an admirer of Mahatma Gandhi's passive resistance movement, and attended rallies where ANC leader Albert Luthuli spoke.

Ebrahim joined the anti-apartheid movement by joining the NIC in 1952 during the Defiance campaign. In the same year, he became a member of the ANC Youth League. As a member of the NIC he got to be a delegate to Congress of the People that adopted the Freedom Charter in 1955.

He went on to become a member of the ANC armed wing Umkhonto We Sizwe in 1961 and was a member of the organization that carried out sabotage across the country. He would later say that the Sharpeville massacre of 1960, where 69 protestors were shot dead by the Transvaal police, changed his mind about peaceful means of protest and passive resistance, leading him to join the armed wing of the ANC.

He was arrested in 1963 under the Sabotage act. He was tried in the Pietermaritzburg Sabotage Trial that included 18 other activists and was sentenced to a 15-year imprisonment at the Robben Island Maximum Security Prison. His time at the prison coincided with the time that other prominent activists including Nelson Mandela were in the same prison. During his time in prison, for a brief period he shared his cell with Jacob Zuma, who would later be the president of the country.

Ebrahim would write in his memoir later of the physical abuse, torture, and suffering inflicted in the prison saying, "In prison we were assaulted, starved, under-clothed and exposed to bitter cold weather. We were sworn at and humiliated in the most degrading manner. We broke stones and ate a measly meal. For years we were made to stand stark naked for long periods of time in an open courtyard, sometimes in biting cold weather." Despite this, he used his time in the prison to obtain two university degrees, Bachelor of Arts and Bachelor of Commerce, from the University of South Africa.

Ebrahim was released from prison in 1979, with the condition that he not participate in any political activities, and followed the ANC's order to go into exile the following year. However, he was arrested again in 1989 for planting landmines in white-owned farms in Swaziland (now Eswatini) in 1986, along with two others. He was kidnapped from Swaziland by South African apartheid agents and sentenced to 20 years of imprisonment, again in Robben Island. During the trial, a former Umkhonto we Sizwe operative turned state witness, Glory Sedibe (known in court as “Mr X1”), testified for the prosecution against Ebrahim and his co-accused in 1988. Ebrahim was released in 1991; the kidnapping was ruled illegal since it had taken place outside South African jurisdiction.

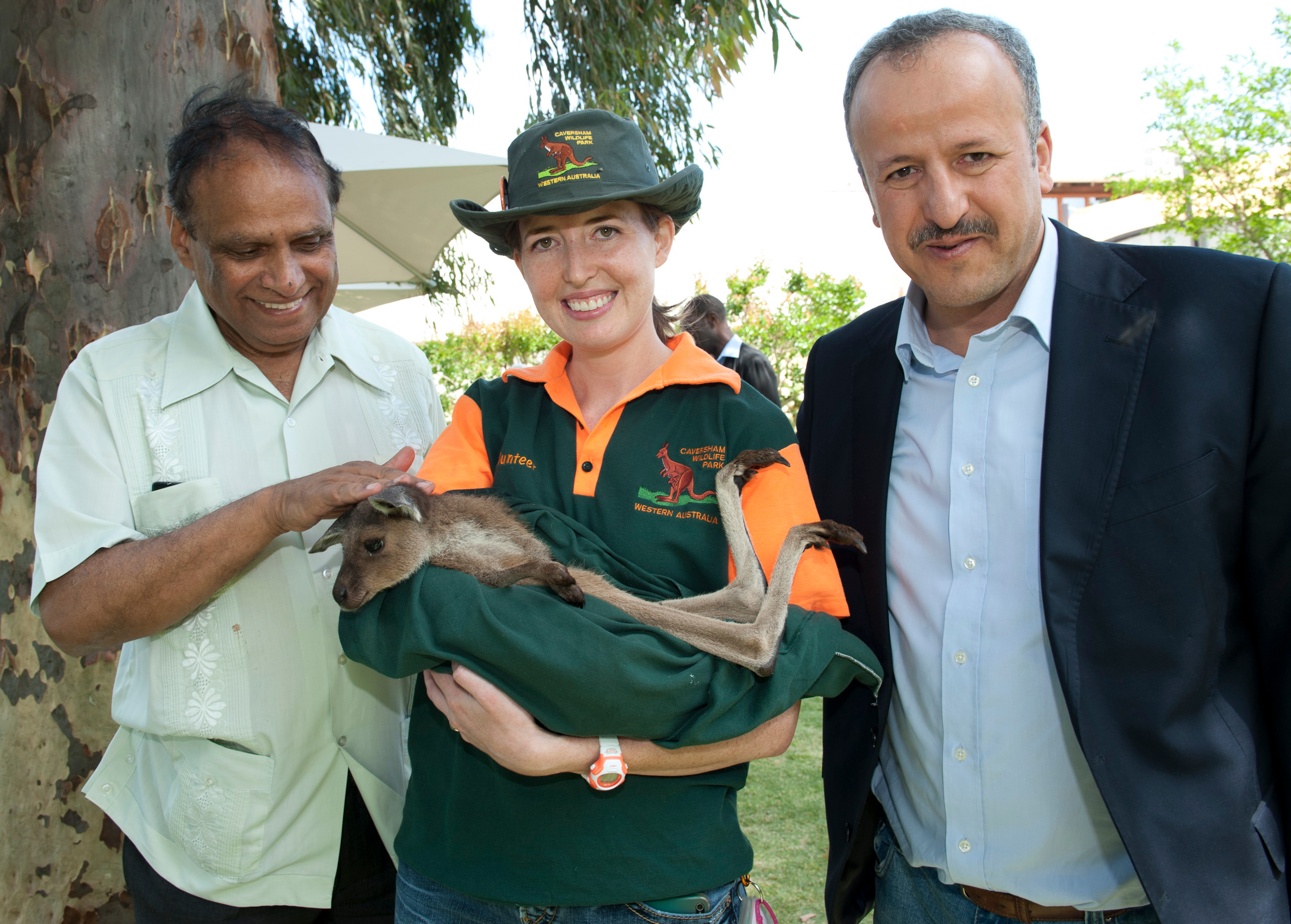
Ebrahim in Australia (2013)

Ebrahim was part of the first democratically elected government of South Africa in 1994, first as a member of the National Assembly, and then as an advisor, assisting with conflict mediation between the Palestinians and Israel, the Democratic Republic of the Congo and Rwanda, and in Nepal, Bolivia, Kosovo, and Burundi. As a mediator in the Israeli–Palestinian conflict he advocated for a middle ground between the multiple Palestinian organizations. He met the Palestine Liberation Organization leader Yasser Arafat in 2001 in the West Bank during this time. In 2002, he was part of a group of South Africans that called for a Palestinian boycott of Israel and called for sanctions against the Israeli state. In 2010, he had called for an end to the "cleansing of Palestinians from Jerusalem" noting that the "Israel and Palestine conflict (was) primarily about freedom to live in dignity".

He was appointed the deputy foreign minister in 2009 and served in the position for six years between 2009 and 2014. He also served as the member of the National Executive Committee of the African National Congress for over 26 years between 1991 and 2017. He represented the constituency of Chatsworth in KwaZulu-Natal.

== Personal life ==
Ebrahim, who was also known as Ebie, met his future wife Shannon née Field, a United Nations official, in 1998. The couple married in 2000 and went on to have a son and a daughter. He also had another daughter from his earlier relationship with an American academic Julia Wells. (Note: Some sources note the spelling of Wells's first name as Julie)

Ebrahim was a fan of Indian film music, listening to singers including Lata Mangeshkar, Mohammed Rafi, Kishore Kumar, and Geeta Dutt. It is noted that when he was underground on radio duty scanning radio stations, including Radio Moscow, Voice of America, South African Broadcasting Corporation, and the BBC, he would find himself tuning to All India Radio listening to Indian film music. When incarcerated prisoners in Robben island were allowed to choose music for broadcast, he would select Bollywood music to confuse the prison warders. He was also a fan of Soviet realist writer Nikolai Ostrovsky's works.

Ebrahim died on 6 December 2021 at home in Johannesburg. He was aged 84. He was provided a state funeral by the Gauteng province at the Westpark Cemetery.
