= Ronald Suresh Roberts =

British West Indian writer and lawyer

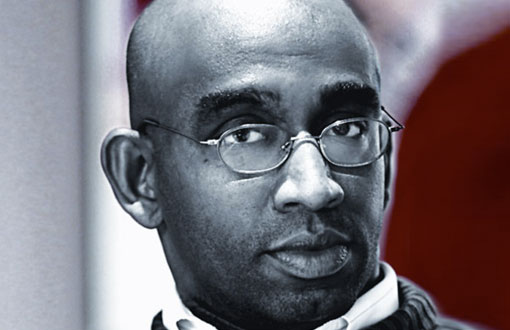
- Roberts in 2004
- Born: 17 February 1968 (age 57); London, England
- Education: Fatima College
- Alma mater: Balliol College, Oxford; Harvard Law School
- Occupation: Writer
- Years active: 1991–present
- Website: Official website

Ronald Suresh Roberts (born 17 February 1968) is a British West Indian writer and lawyer. He is best known for his biographies of two leading figures in the "New South Africa", author Nadine Gordimer and former South African President Thabo Mbeki.

== Early life and education ==
Roberts was born on 17 February 1968 in London, England. Born in Hammersmith to an Afro-Caribbean father and an Indo-Malaysian mother, he grew up in his father's homeland of Trinidad and Tobago. He attended Fatima College in Port of Spain and went to Balliol College, Oxford in 1986 to read law on a Trinidadian national scholarship.

In 1991, he completed a Master of Laws at Harvard Law School. His master's thesis, supervised by Randall Kennedy, was later published by the New York University Press as Clarence Thomas and the Tough Love Crowd: Counterfeit Heroes and Unhappy Truths, a critique of black neoconservatism. After his graduation from Harvard, Roberts worked on Wall Street at Winthrop, Stimson, Putnam & Roberts.

== Career in South Africa ==
In 1994, on a Winthrop-sponsored leave, Roberts joined an international delegation of lawyers who travelled to South Africa to monitor the country's first democratic elections. Charmed by South Africa, he remained there, working briefly at the Johannesburg law firm Deneys Reitz. Thereafter he took up policy and political work full-time, beginning in 1995 with research with Tiego Moseneke about privatisation and public–private partnerships. He became a close friend of the South African politician Kader Asmal, who was the first post-apartheid Minister of Water Affairs; Roberts, Asmal, and Louise Asmal co-wrote a 1996 book about the Truth and Reconciliation Commission, entitled Reconciliation Through Truth: A Reckoning of Apartheid's Criminal Governance. Between 1996 and 1999, Roberts worked in the Department of Water Affairs as a policy and strategy advisor to Asmal.

Over the next decade, Roberts became a prominent and controversial figure in South African literary and political circles. He was particularly well known for publishing scathing critiques of his adversaries in the press; in a 2007 column Mail & Guardian editor Ferial Haffajee said that Roberts "tests my commitment to freedom of expression".

=== No Cold Kitchen (2006) ===
Roberts's first biography was No Cold Kitchen: A Biography of Nadine Gordimer, about the Nobel Laureate and author Nadine Gordimer. He wrote the first draft of the biography between 1997 and 2002 with Gordimer's full cooperation, several interviews, and access to her personal archives. However, Gordimer withdrew her endorsement upon reading the draft in December 2002. According to Roberts, she objected to his account of her romantic relationships, to his inclusion of disparaging remarks she had made about Doris Lessing and Ruth First, and to critical passages about her contemporary political views on the Israel–Palestine conflict and the South African AIDS crisis. The project was subsequently dropped by Bloomsbury Publishing in London and Farrar, Straus and Giroux in New York, who were also publishers of Gordimer's fiction.

Roberts accused Gordimer of censorship, saying that she "wanted complete control, tsar-like, which would have turned the manuscript into pious crap". The resulting "low-intensity war" between Roberts and Gordimer caused a major stir in South African literary circles. The book was ultimately published in South Africa in 2006 by STE Publishers, and it was a finalist for the that year's Alan Paton Award. In later years, the relationship between Roberts and Gordimer became the subject of Craig Higginson's play The Imagined Land, the inspiration for Patrick Flanery's novel Absolution, and a case study in Hermione Lee's Biography: A Very Short Introduction; these and various other sources treated the dispute as emblematic both of ethical quandaries in biographical writing and of broader cultural tensions in post-apartheid South Africa.

=== Fit to Govern (2007) ===
Shortly after publishing No Cold Kitchen, Roberts was approached by South African President Thabo Mbeki to write the first authorized account of his intellectual and policy agendas. Called Fit to Govern: The Native Intelligence of Thabo Mbeki, the book was controversial for its insistent post-colonialism and focus on Mbeki as an African leader as opposed to a Western one. In the book Roberts argued that Mbeki's view on the link between HIV and AIDS, was not one of ignorance or denial but scientific curiosity—and that many of the points raised by Mbeki and initially controversial have since entered the orthodoxy.

In 2007 the controversial author and AIDS denialist Anthony Brink accused Roberts of using elements of his own unfinished work in Roberts' biography of Mbeki. Roberts countered that Brink had no relevant research given that as late as 2005 Brink remained a "complete stranger to the president at a personal level".

=== Disputes with the Sunday Times ===
In 2006 Leslie Weinkove, Acting Judge of the Western Cape High Court judgement, found against Roberts in a defamation case Roberts instituted against the South African newspaper The Sunday Times. The judgment gives detailed descriptions of his behaviour in dealing with a complaint against the South African Broadcasting Corporation. Roberts' response to the judgment was published in an extensive interview in the South African Mail & Guardian, which cites a suppressed letter from Ken Owen, a previous editor of The Sunday Times, which recognised The Times′ "eagerness to smear Ronald Roberts" and repudiated the words the newspaper had attributed to him, adding: "I must say that on matters within my knowledge [its] reporting is false."

In 2007 the same newspaper incorrectly placed Roberts, Christine Qunta and others in a group of 12 signatories to an article supposedly supporting AIDS denialism. Roberts complained and the Times issued a retraction and apology to the group. Roberts accepted the apology but maintained that the newspaper's conduct was "shameful but not surprising."

== Later career ==
As of 2021, Roberts was a student at the University of Liverpool School of Law and Social Justice and a visiting senior fellow in the Department of Sociology at the London School of Economics.
