= John Barrow =

John Barrow may refer to:

== Politics ==
- John Abarough (died 1540), Barow or Barrow, (died c. 1540), English politician
- Sir John Barrow, 1st Baronet (1764–1848), English statesman and writer
- John Barrow (civil servant) (1808-1898), son of Sir John Barrow. Admiralty clerk and writer
- John Henry Barrow (1817–1874), South Australian politician, journalist and minister
- John Barrow (American politician) (born 1955), former U.S. Representative from Georgia

== Places ==
- Cape John Barrow, a geographical feature on Ellesmere Island, Canada
- John Barrow (Little Rock), neighborhood of Little Rock, Arkansas, United States
- John Barrow Island, one of the Queen Elizabeth Islands in the Canadian Arctic Archipelago

== Other ==
- John Barrow (historian) (fl. 1735–1774), English historian and mathematician
- John Barrow (Canadian football) (1935–2015), Canadian Football Hall of Fame member
- John Barrow (Canon of Windsor) (1651–1684), Canon of Windsor
- John Barrow (Catholic priest, born 1735) (1735–1811), Catholic priest towards the end of the penal times for English Catholics
- John Dodgson Barrow (1824–1907), American landscape painter
- John D. Barrow (1952–2020), British theoretical physicist and author
