= Barrow baronets of Ulverstone (1835) =

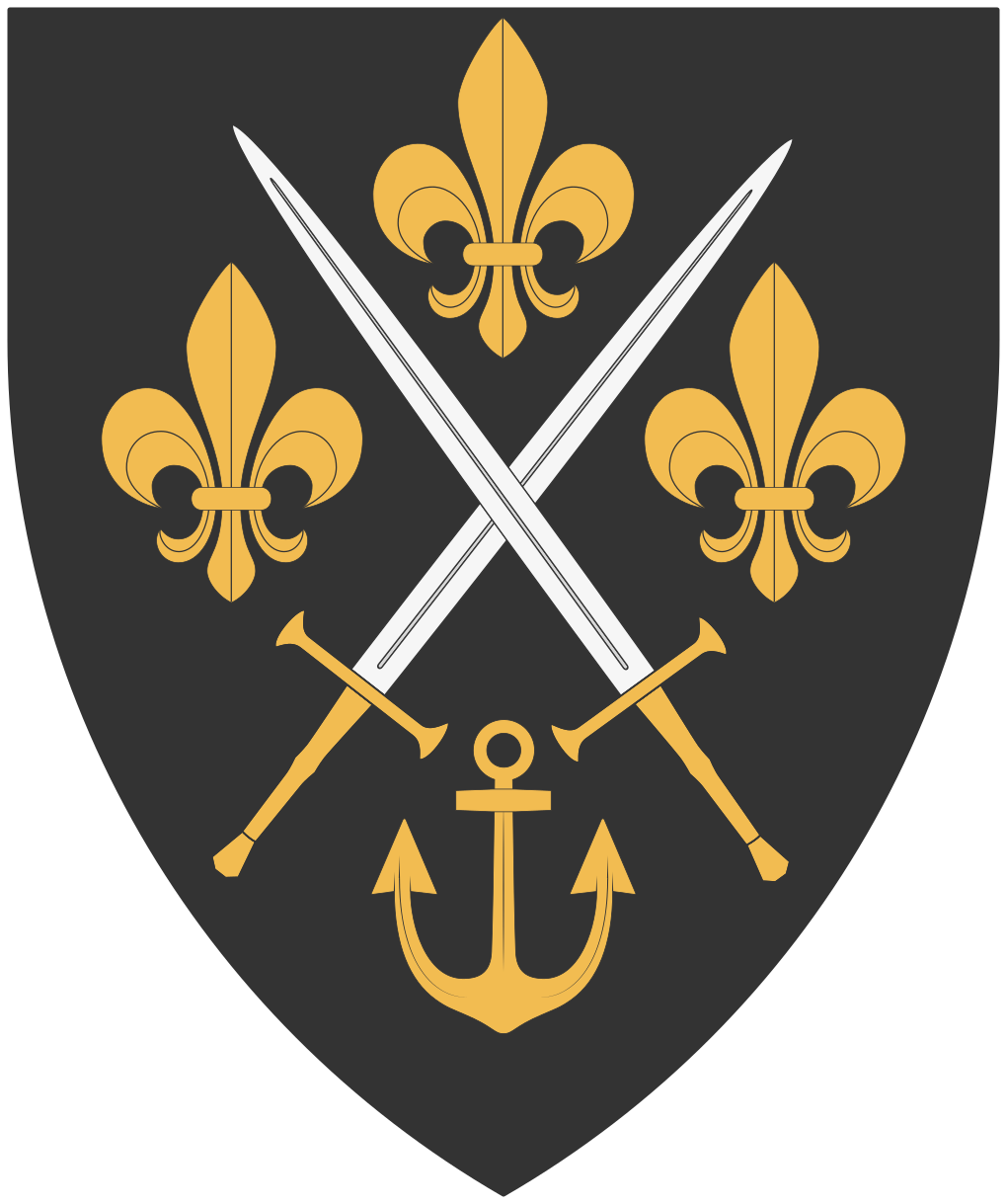
Escutcheon of the Barrow baronets of Ulverstone

The Barrow baronetcy, of Ulverstone in the County of Lancaster, was created in the Baronetage of the United Kingdom on 30 March 1835 for the secretary of the Admiralty John Barrow. He was succeeded by his son George, the 2nd Baronet, in 1870 Chief Clerk of the Colonial Office.

As of 2026 the baronetcy is held by his great-great-great-grandson (the title having descended from father to son), the 7th Baronet, who succeeded in 2009.

== Barrow baronets, of Ulverstone (1835) ==
- Sir John Barrow, 1st Baronet (1764–1848)
- Sir George Barrow, 2nd Baronet (1806–1876)
- Sir John Croker Barrow, 3rd Baronet (1833–1900)
- Sir Francis Laurence John Barrow, 4th Baronet (1862–1950)
- Sir Wilfred John Wilson Croker Barrow, 5th Baronet (1897–1960)
- Sir Richard John Uniacke Barrow, 6th Baronet (1933–2009)
- Sir Anthony John Grenfell Barrow, 7th Baronet (born 1962)

The heir presumptive to the baronetcy is John Lendon Barrow (born 1934). He is the eldest son of the third son of the 4th Baronet. His heir apparent is his son Paul Lendon Barrow (born 1966).
