= George Back =

Royal Navy Admiral (1796–1878)

Admiral Sir George Back FRS
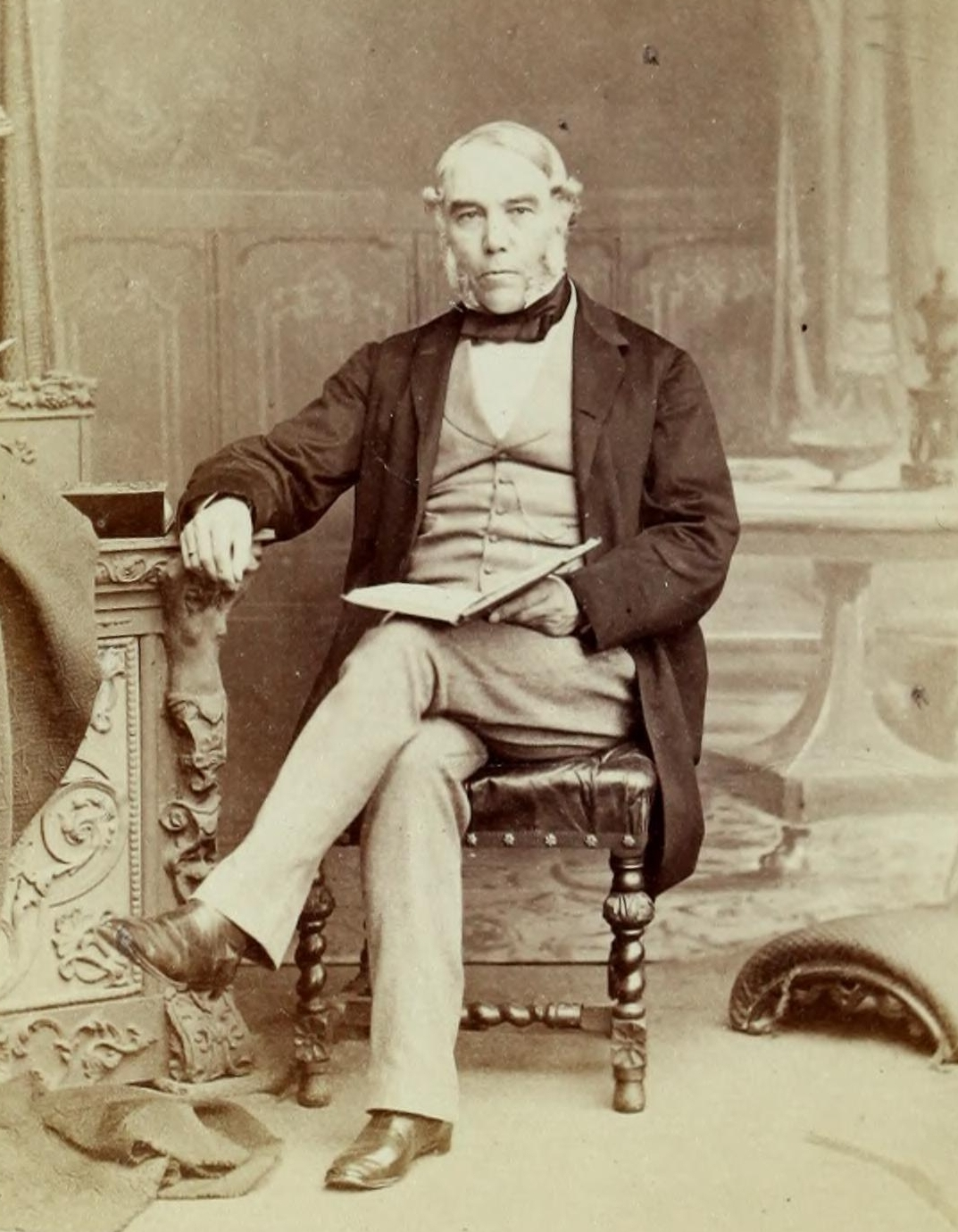
- Back in 1863
- Born: 6 November 1796; Stockport, England
- Died: 23 June 1878 (aged 81); London, England
- Burial place: Kensal Green Cemetery
- Spouse: Theodosia Elizabeth Hammond (m. 1846)
- Relatives: Bernard Pares (nephew)
- Military career
- Allegiance: United Kingdom
- Branch: Royal Navy
- Service years: 1808–1878
- Rank: Admiral
- Wars: Napoleonic Wars

Admiral Sir George Back FRS (6 November 1796 – 23 June 1878) was a British Royal Navy officer, explorer of the Canadian Arctic, naturalist and artist.

== Early life ==
He was born in Stockport on 6 November 1796 and went to school at Stockport Grammar School however he left at the age of 11 to go into the army.

== Career ==
As a boy, he went to sea as a volunteer in the frigate HMS Arethusa in 1808 and took part in the destruction of batteries on the Spanish coast. In the following year, he was involved in combat in the Bay of Biscay, until he was captured by the French. Back remained a prisoner at Verdun until the peace of early 1814; during this time he studied French and mathematics and practised his skills as an artist, which he later put to use in recording his travels through the Canadian Arctic.

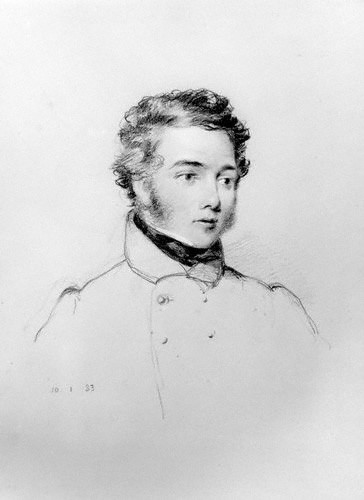
Back in 1833

Following his release, Back served on HMS Akbar and HMS Bulwark as a midshipman before volunteering to serve under John Franklin in his first expedition to the Arctic in 1818. Back also served under Franklin in his two overland expeditions to survey the northern coast of North America, first on the Coppermine expedition—when Back was responsible for all the surveying and chart making—and then the Mackenzie River expedition in 1824–1826, during which time he was promoted first to lieutenant and then to commander in 1825. Lacking appointment to a ship, Back was unemployed on the half-pay list, from 1827 to 1833.

=== Back River Expedition ===
By 1832 nothing had been heard of the Arctic explorer John Ross since 1829, and plans were made to find him. Back proposed to take fur trade routes to Great Slave Lake and follow the Great Fish River northeast to Ross's probable location. No European had ever seen this river but it was known from Indian reports (it was later named the Back River).

He left England in February 1833, reached Great Slave Lake in August where George McLeod of the Hudson's Bay Company had built winter quarters at Fort Reliance at the eastern end of the lake. He located the river on 29 August and returned to the fort to winter. In March 1834 he received a packet of letters saying that Ross was back in England and telling him to explore the coast from Ross's King William Land to Franklin's Point Turnagain. This was the main unknown region, along with a few hundred miles eastward from Point Barrow and the area around King William Island which was completely misunderstood.

He set out on 7 June 1834, passed Artillery Lake and Clinton-Colden Lake and reached the river on 28 June. He ran east down a river in the barren grounds with 83 rapids but only one portage. On 23 July he reached salt water at Chantrey Inlet. He explored the inlet, saw King William Island to the north and then wisely turned back. He reached Fort Reliance on 27 September 1834 and England on 8 September 1835.

The expedition's naturalist was Richard King, who contributed appendices on meteorology and botany to Back's account of the expedition; he also wrote his own two-volume account of the expedition.

=== Frozen Strait Expedition ===
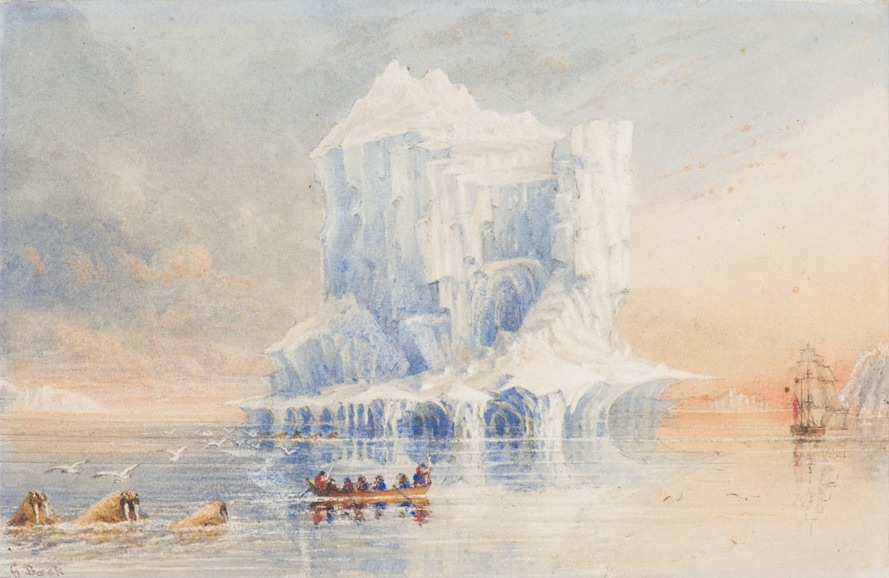
HMS Terror (right) anchored near an iceberg off Baffin Island, as painted by Back. Three walruses are at left.

In 1836, Back was promoted to captain by an Order in Council, a rare honour. The goal this time was the northern end of Hudson Bay at either Repulse Bay (now Naujaat) or Wager Inlet. From there he would drag boats overland to seawater and sail the unknown coast west to the Back River and Franklin's Point Turnagain. These were the two easternmost known points on the north coast west of Hudson Bay. The area between them and between the Back River and Hudson Bay was unknown. In fact, 60 mi (97 km) northwest of Repulse Bay is the cul-de-sac of the Gulf of Boothia. To reach the Back River he would have had to drag his boats 250 mi (400 km) west-northwest. He was given command of the converted bomb vessel HMS Terror with a crew of 60 and provisions for 18 months.

He left in June 1836, which was late in the season. Because of contrary winds they had to be towed by steamship all the way to the Orkney Islands. He reached Hudson Strait on the first of August. By the end of the month, Terror was beset by ice somewhere east of Frozen Strait. It remained icebound for 10 months: at one point Terror was pushed 40 ft (12 m) up the side of a cliff by the pressure of the ice.

Several times preparations were made to abandon ship. Scurvy appeared in January and three men died of it. In the spring of 1837, an encounter with an iceberg further damaged the ship. Sometimes the pressure of the ice was enough to force turpentine out of the planks. The ship drifted with the ice south along Southampton Island and then east toward Hudson Strait. It was not until July that the ice retreated sufficiently to allow Terror to head for home.

Soon a large mass of ice frozen to the vessel broke off causing the remaining ice to tip the ship on its side until the ice was hacked off. The vessel was in a sinking condition by the time he was able to beach the ship on the coast of Ireland at Lough Swilly. "There was not one on board who did not express astonishment that we had ever floated across the Atlantic."

Although a number of Arctic explorers allowed their ships to be frozen in harbours for the winter, this seems to be the only case of a ship – save for the disastrous Franklin Expedition – being caught in offshore ice. Its survival is a tribute to the strength of bomb vessels in Arctic service.

=== Retirement ===
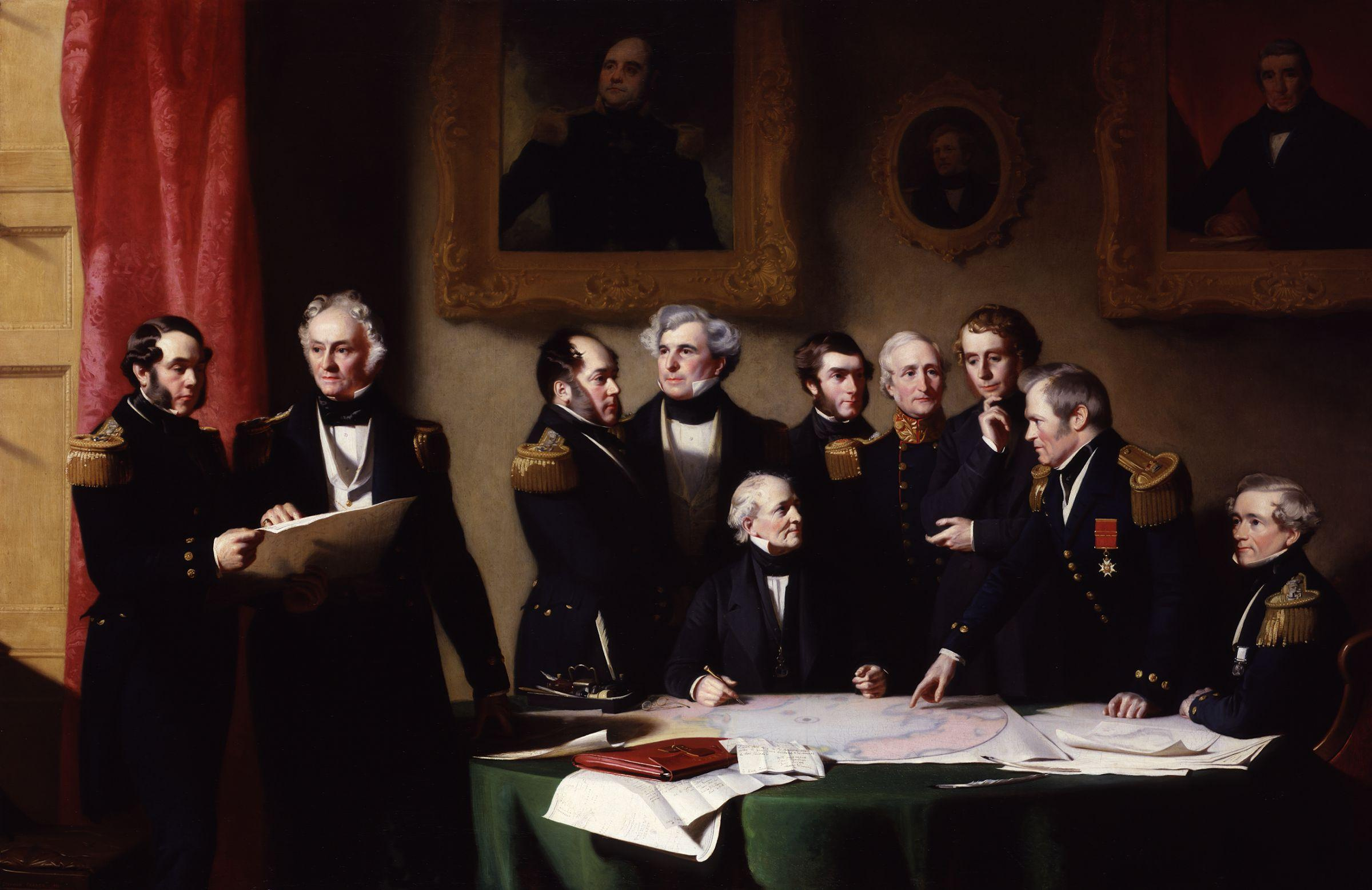
The Arctic Council Planning a Search for Sir John Franklin by Stephen Pearce, 1851

Poor health caused Back to retire from active service. He was made a Knight Bachelor on 18 March 1839, and maintained an interest in Arctic exploration for the rest of his life. In 1859, he was nominated a rear-admiral. Back served as an advisor to the Admiralty during the search for Franklin's lost expedition, and as vice-president of the Royal Geographical Society, having received its gold and silver medal. Although nominally retired, Back remained on the Admiralty List and, based on seniority, he was promoted to vice-admiral in 1863 and finally admiral in 1867.

== Artist ==
George Back was an accomplished artist. Historian Leslie H. Neatby wrote, “Back had neither the seriousness of disposition nor the intensity of purpose which are indispensable to the great captain. His virtues were of a different order. No other man has viewed the scenery of the Canadian North with so appreciative an eye, nor has been able to give such full and vigorous expression to that appreciation.”

A watercolour of an iceberg, believed to have been painted by Back following his 1836–37 expedition, sold at auction on 13 September 2011 for $59,600, despite its being unsigned and undated. Experts at the prestigious London auction house Bonhams credited the watercolour to Back, claiming it had been presented by Back to his sister Katherine Pares, and thence descended through her family.

The auction house opined that the scene surrounding the towering iceberg appears to match a description in Back's Narrative of an Expedition in H.M.S. Terror (1838) when the Terror was in the Davis Strait (between Canada and Greenland) that reads "in the evening (of 29 July 1836) when the weather cleared ... we observed an enormous berg, the perpendicular face of which was not less than 300 feet high..."

Back drew HMS Terror Thrown Up By Ice (1836) and the portrait A Buffalo Pound (1823), which was later reworked into an engraving. He painted the watercolour 'Winter View of Fort Franklin' (1825–26).

A recent collection of twelve portrait studies of male and female characters mainly from the Canadian Yellow Knife Tribe, eleven of which were personally signed by the artist, sold for £24,000 at auction on 16 June 2020.

== Personal life ==
In 1846, Back married Theodosia Elizabeth Hammond, a widow.

== Death ==
Back died on 23 June 1878 in London.

He is buried in the Kensal Green Cemetery, London.
