= Robert Batty =

Robert Batty may refer to:

- Robert Batty (artist) (1789–1848), English army officer and artist
- Robert Batty (physician) (1763–1849), his father, English physician

== See also ==
- Robert Battey (1828–1895), American surgeon
