= Truter =

Truter is a surname. Notable people with the surname include:

- Anna Maria Truter (1777–1857), Cape Colony illustrator
- Johannes Andreas Truter (1763–1845), Cape Colony judge
- Oloff Johannes Truter (1829–1881), South African civil servant
- Petrus Johannes Truter (1747–1825), Cape Colony explorer and official
