= Cape Barrow =

Cape Barrow may refer to:

- Cape Barrow (Antarctica), The northern point of Flat Island, marking the west side of the entrance to Robertson Bay, Victoria Land
- Cape Barrow (Nunavut), a cape which separates Coronation Gulf from Bathurst Inlet in Nunavut, Canada
- Cape John Barrow
- Cape Barrow (Palmer Archipelago), a cape on Hoseason Island in the Palmer Archipelago
- Point Barrow, a headland on the Arctic coast in the U.S. state of Alaska
