= The Arctic Council Planning a Search for Sir John Franklin =

Painting by Stephen Pearce

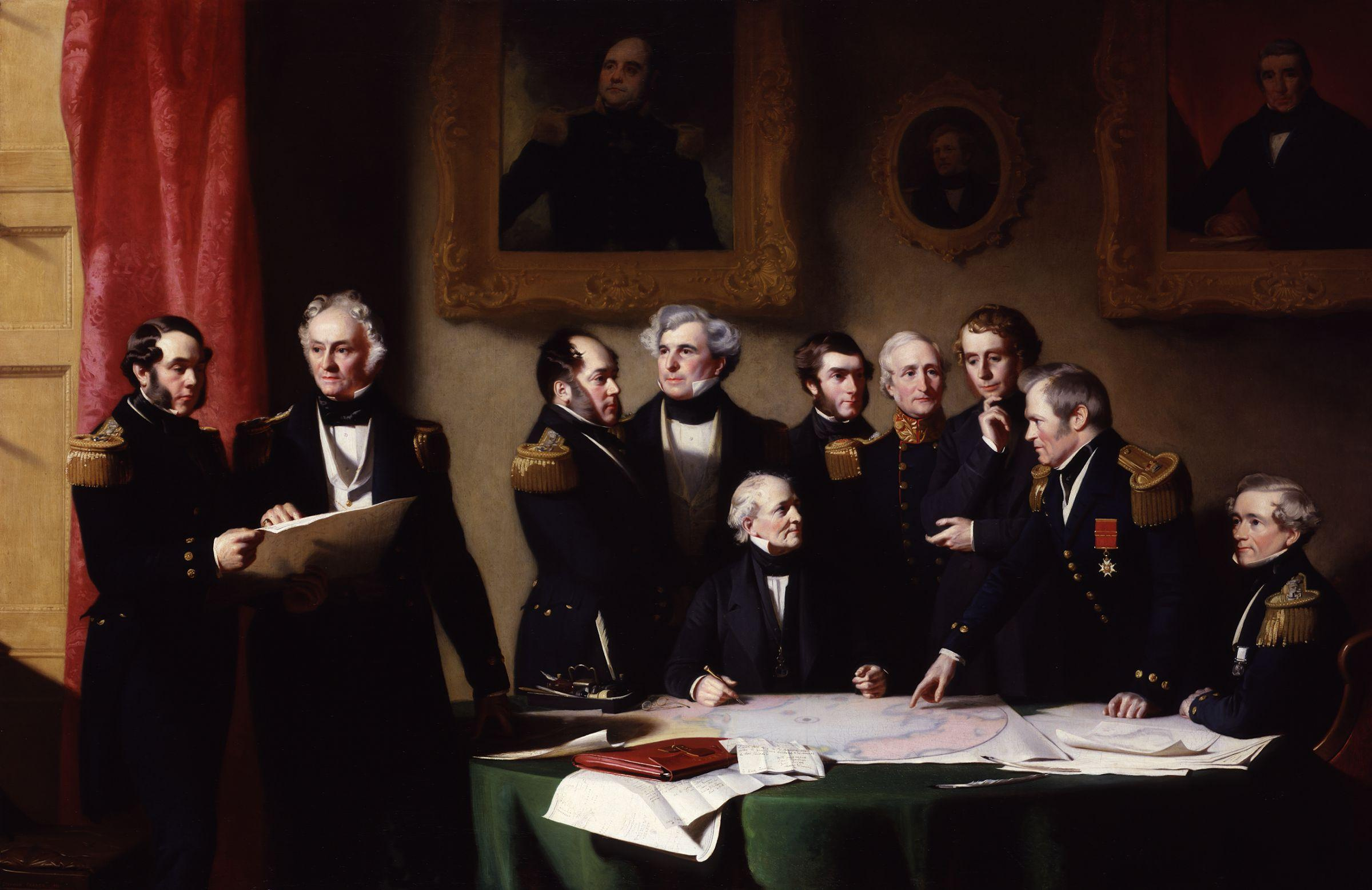
- Artist: Stephen Pearce
- Year: 1851
- Type: Oil on canvas, portrait painting
- Dimensions: 117.5 cm × 183.3 cm (46.3 in × 72.2 in)
- Location: National Portrait Gallery, London

The Arctic Council Planning a Search for Sir John Franklin is an 1851 oil painting by the British artist Stephen Pearce. Despite its title, it does not represent an actual historical meeting, and there was no formal Arctic Council. It depicts an imagined meeting at the Admiralty in London of a those who had been instrumental in organising the ongoing search for the lost expedition of Sir John Franklin who in 1845 had attempted to discover a Northwest Passage through the Arctic Archipelago of Northern Canada.

Depicted in the painting are, from left to right:

- George Back
- William Edward Parry
- Edward Joseph Bird
- James Clark Ross
- Francis Beaufort (seated)
- John Barrow Jr.
- Edward Sabine
- William Baillie-Hamilton
- John Richardson
- Frederick William Beechey (seated)

The painted portraits in the background are of Franklin, Captain James Fitzjames, and Sir John Barrow.

By 1847, fears for Franklin and his men had grown and the following year three rescue missions were sent out. They did not find Franklin's expedition and the search continued. In early 1850, John Barrow Jr. commissioned his friend Stephen Pearce to paint a group portrait to commemorate the ongoing search efforts. Sir John Franklin and Captain James Fitzjames were still considered to be alive at this point. Immediately after the painting was completed, it took on a propaganda role to keep the Franklin Expedition and the need for more search expeditions in the public mind.

The Arctic Council was displayed at the Royal Academy Exhibition of 1853 at the National Gallery alongside two portraits by Pearce of John Rae and William Penny who had both taken part in the search for the Franklin expedition. From May until October 1857, it was included in the Art Treasures Exhibition in Manchester, coinciding with the fitting out of Lady Franklin's privately organised final search expedition under Captain Leopold McClintock.

After his death on 9 December 1898, John Barrow Jr. bequeathed all of his Arctic portraits by Pearce to the National Portrait Gallery. On 22 July 1899, the NPG opened an Arctic Room which contained all of Pearce's Arctic portraits (including those donated by Sophia Cracroft after her death in 1892) and portraits of Sir John Franklin and Lady Franklin. This Arctic Room existed, albeit in ever diminishing form, until at least 1928.

== Bibliography ==
- Tetteroo, F.A., A nationally pleasing picture. The history of The Arctic Council (1851). Polar Record. 2026;62:e23. doi:10.1017/S0032247426100436.
- Ross W.G., The Arctic Council of 1851: fact or fancy?, Polar Record. 2004;40(2):135-141. doi:10.1017/S0032247403003267.
- Ormond, Richard. Early Victorian Portraits, National Portrait Gallery, 1974.
