= Barow =

Barow may refer to:

- Bārow, a variant name of Vala Rud, a village in Zanjan County, Zanjan Province, Iran
- John Barow or Barrow, a number of people
- Margaret à Barow or Barrow, (1500–1560/69), an English lady, known for her learning, sometimes referred to as Margaret Aborough (a variant of à Barow / Barrow)

== See also ==
- Thomas Barowe or Barrow (died 1497?), English ecclesiastic and judge
- Luserina Barows, a character in the role-playing video game Suikoden V
- Roger Barows (foaled 2016), a Japanese Thoroughbred racehorse
- Barrow (disambiguation)
