= William Somerville (physician) =

Scottish physician ((1771–1860)

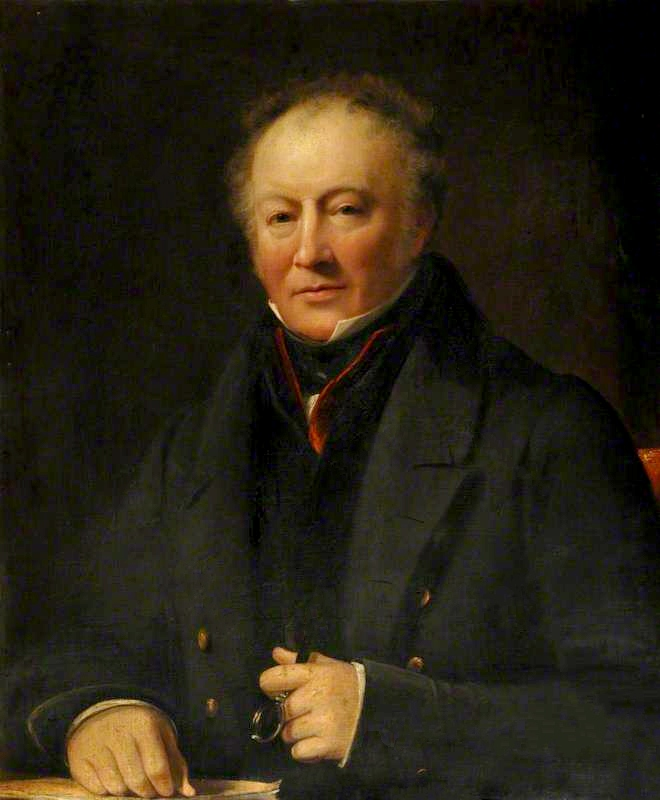
Portrait, c. 1840

William Somerville FRS FRSE FLS LRCP (1771 – 25 June 1860) was a Scottish physician and inspector of the Army Medical Board. He was the husband of eminent mathematician and scientist Mary Somerville and father of four.

== Life ==
Somerville was descended from the ancient family of Somerville of Cambusnethan, a branch of the Somervilles of Drum, who were ennobled in 1424.

He was born on 22 April 1771 the eldest son of the Rev Dr Thomas Somerville DD FRSE, minister of Jedburgh and his wife Martha Charters. He was educated near his home in Jedburgh.

He studied medicine at Aberdeen University, specialising in surgery. He graduated MB ChB around 1790 then would have undergone practical experience before receiving his doctorate (MD) in 1800.

In 1801 he and Petrus Johannes Truter led the Truter-Somerville Expedition into Africa, which reached Bechuanaland.

In 1806 he entered the British Army as Garrison Surgeon to the Cape Colony in South Africa, and was present at the taking of the Cape of Good Hope.

From 1807 to 1811 he served in Canada as Inspector Of Hospitals, under his friend Sir James Craig. He served in Sicily 1811 to 1813.

In 1813 he was appointed Deputy Inspector of Military Hospitals in Scotland, and he then settled in Edinburgh, at 53 Northumberland Street in Edinburgh's Second New Town. In the same year he was elected a Fellow of the Royal Society of Edinburgh. His proposers were Sir Henry Wellwood Moncreiff, Dr James Gregory, and John Playfair.

In 1816 he was appointed one of the principal medical inspectors of the Army Medical Board of England. He was admitted a Licentiate of the Royal College of Physicians in 1817 was elected a fellow of the Royal Society.

In 1819 he became Physician to the Chelsea Hospital in London, caring for retired soldiers (generally known as the Chelsea Pensioners). In London he lived with his family at Hanover Square, Westminster.

Somerville was an active member of the Athenaeum Club from its founding in 1824.

He went to live with his family in Italy in 1838. He died at Florence on 25 June 1860, aged ninety-two. He is buried there in the old Protestant Cemetery.

His second wife Mary Somerville survived him, and died at Naples in 1872.

== Family ==
In 1806 he had an illegitimate son, James Craig Somerville (d.1847), whom he fully supported and helped train as a doctor.

His first wife, Ann Rutherfoord of Knowsouth in Roxburghshire, died in Falmouth in 1808. Their only son, Thomas, died in infancy.

By his second wife, Mary, whom he married in 1812, he had three daughters and one son, only two daughters, Martha Charters Somerville (1815-1879) and Mary Charlotte Somerville (1817-1875) survived to adulthood. Neither married.
