= Petrus Johannes Truter =

Petrus Johannes Truter (17 December 1747, in Cape Town – 31 January 1825, in Swellendam, Overberg) was an explorer and official in the (Dutch?) East India Company, a Member of the Court of Justice, and a Commissioner of Police.

P.J. Truter was one of 14 children born to Jan Andries Truter and Maria Kuypermann. He married Johanna Ernestina Blankenberg on 18 April 1773, who bore him 7 children including Anna Maria Truter, who later became the wife of Sir John Barrow, 1st Baronet.

In 1801 P.J. Truter helped lead the Truter-Somerville Expedition along with William Somerville. The expedition included John Barrow (who would later marry one of his daughters), Samuel Daniell, and missionaries Jan Matthys Kok and William Edwards.
