= Sir George Barrow, 2nd Baronet =

English civil servant (1806–1876)

Sir George Barrow, 2nd Baronet, CMG (22 October 1806 – 1876) was an English civil servant.

== Life ==
Barrow was the eldest son of Sir John Barrow, 1st Baronet and Anna Maria Truter. Sir George was born in Mayfair, educated at Charterhouse, and appointed to a clerkship in the Colonial Office in 1825. He was promoted to senior clerk in 1843, and became chief clerk in July 1870. In the same month he was appointed secretary to the Order of St. Michael and St. George, a post he held concurrently with that of chief clerk in the Colonial Office, until his retirement in September, 1872. In May 1874 he was appointed a Companion of the Order of St Michael and St George (CMG).

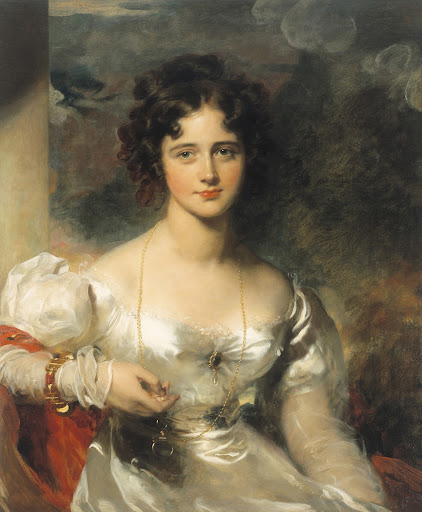
Portrait of Rosamond Croker by Thomas Lawrence, 1827

In 1832 he married Rosamond, daughter of W. Pennell, consul-general at Brazil, adopted daughter of the Right Hon. John Wilson Croker and sister of Croker's wife. He was succeeded in the baronetcy by his eldest son, John Croker Barrow, author of the Valley of Tears and other poems, in which there are some in memoriam verses to his father.

In early life Sir George too exhibited poetic taste in a translation of some odes of Anacreon, which was spoken of favourably by William Gifford, first editor of the Quarterly Review. In 1850, Sir George laid the foundation-stone of the Barrow monument erected to his father's memory on the Hill of Hoad, Ulverston. In 1857, Sir George Barrow published a small volume, Ceylon Past and Present.

Baronetage of the United Kingdom
Preceded by John Barrow	Baronet (of Ulverstone); 1848–1876	Succeeded by John Croker Barrow
