= Dragley Beck =

Hamlet in Cumbria, England

Coordinates: 54.190°N 3.085°W

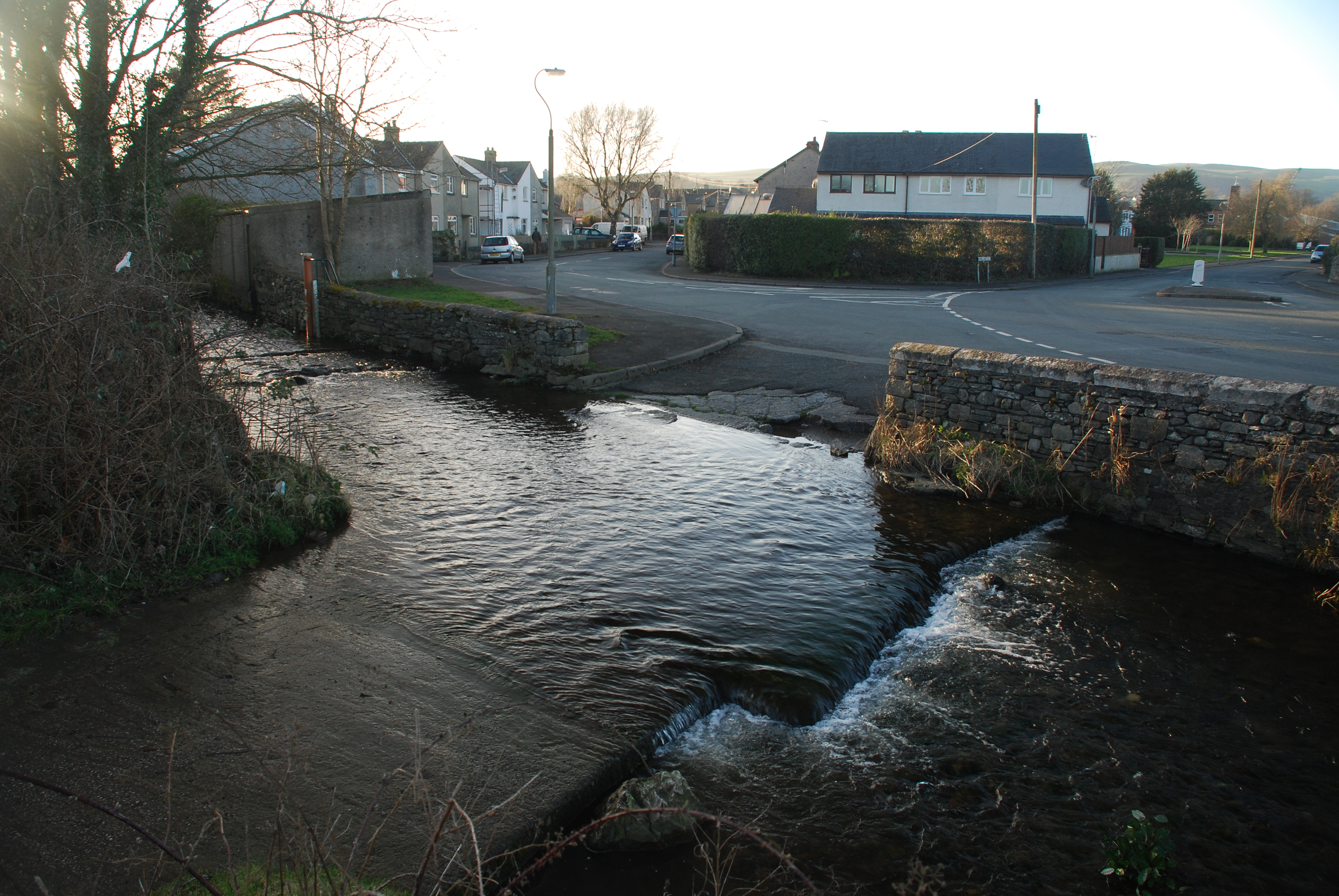
- Dragley Beck

- Location in South Lakeland Location within Cumbria
- OS grid reference: SD292776
- Civil parish: Ulverston
- Unitary authority: Westmorland and Furness
- Ceremonial county: Cumbria
- Region: North West
- Country: England
- Sovereign state: United Kingdom
- Post town: ULVERSTON
- Postcode district: LA12
- Dialling code: 01229
- Police: Cumbria
- Fire: Cumbria
- Ambulance: North West
- UK Parliament: Barrow and Furness

Dragley Beck is a hamlet in Cumbria, England. Historically part of Lancashire, it was the birthplace of Sir John Barrow (1764–1848), one of the founders of the Royal Geographical Society.
