= Wilfrid Barrow =

British soldier (1897–1960)

Sir Wilfrid John Wilson Croker Barrow, 5th Baronet (28 December 1897 – 11 January 1960), was a British soldier and Liberal Party politician.

== Background ==
He was the son of Sir Francis Laurence John Barrow, 4th Bt, and Winifred Sarah Steward of Whitehaven. He was educated at Stonyhurst College, the University of Oxford, the Royal Military College, Sandhurst, and the Middle Temple. He married, in 1926, Patricia FitzGerald Uniacke. They had one son and three daughters. He inherited his father's baronetcy in 1950.

== Military career ==
He served in the European War from 1914 to 1919 and in the Afghan campaign from 1919 to 1920. He was made a Captain of the Royal Fusiliers in 1918, and a Major in 1918. He was Aide-de-camp to the Earl of Ronaldshay, in Bengal in 1920. He was a Temporary King's Messenger in 1923. He was appointed Military Secretary to the Governor of Uganda in 1924. He retired in 1929. He was Regional Officer, at the Ministry of Home Security in 1941. He was Deputy Senior Regional Officer from 1943 to 1944.

== Political career ==
He was Liberal candidate for the Carshalton Division of Surrey at the 1945 General Election, coming third.

Baronetage of the United Kingdom
Preceded by Francis Barrow	Baronet (of Ulverstone); 1950–1960	Succeeded by Richard Barrow
