= The Eventful History of the Mutiny and Piratical Seizure of HMS Bounty =

1831 memoir by Sir John Barrow

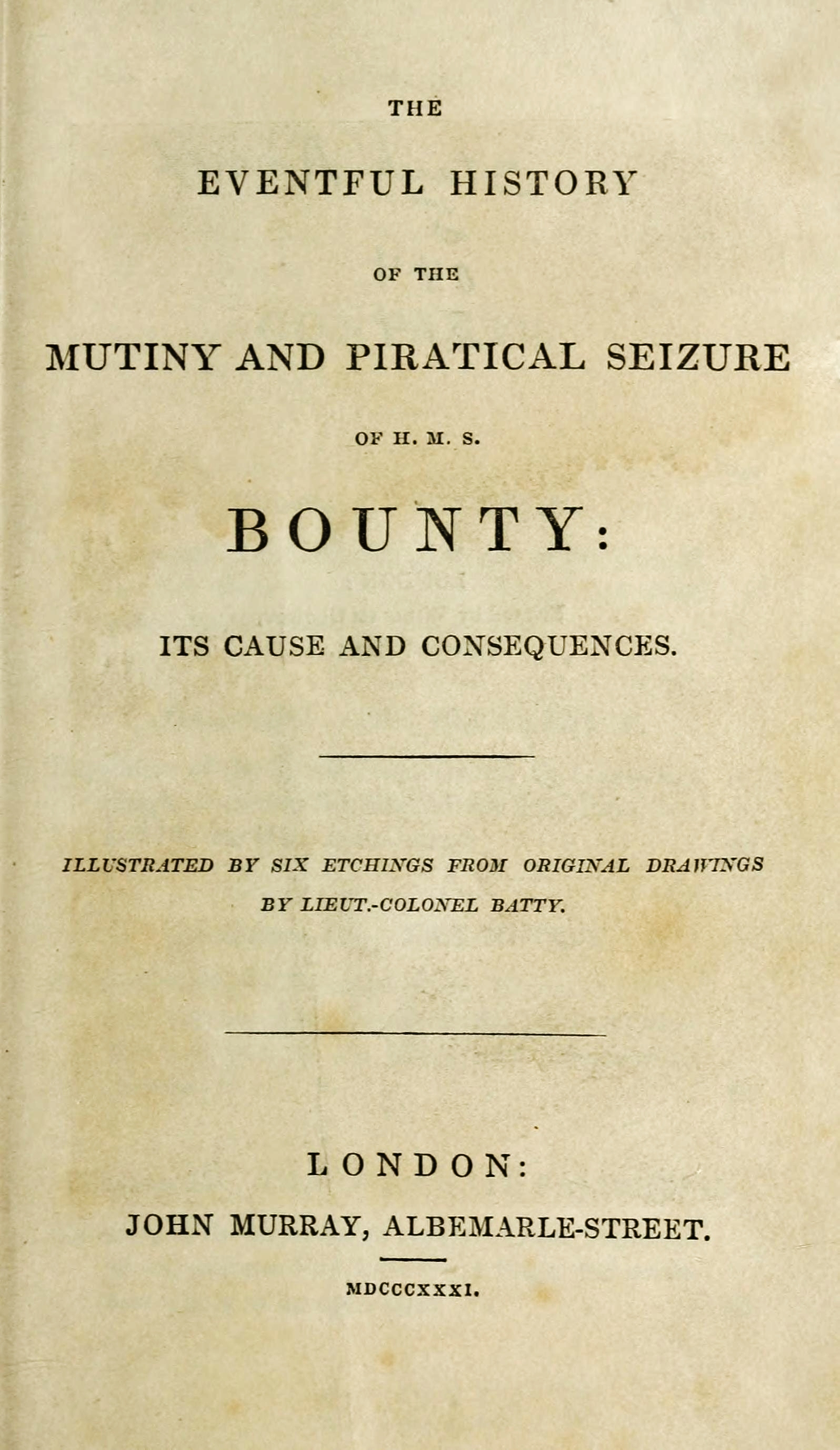
First edition title page

The Eventful History of the Mutiny and Piratical Seizure of H.M.S. Bounty: Its Cause and Consequences is an 1831 memoir by Sir John Barrow is considered the classic account of the mutiny on the Bounty. It includes a description of the island of Tahiti, and a narrative of events from the embarkation of the Bounty in 1787 through to the trial of some of the mutineers in 1792 and the survival of others on Pitcairn Island. The story is told through the medium of the original documents in the case, which Barrow critically evaluates.

It was first published in 1831 by John Murray as the 25th volume in their Family Library series. An American edition followed under the title A Description of Pitcairn's island and its Inhabitants: With an Authentic Account of the Mutiny of the Ship Bounty, and of the Subsequent Fortunes of the Mutineers (New York: Harper, 1832). The many later reissues include a 1936 Oxford World's Classics edition.
