= Thomas Somerville (minister) =

Scottish minister, antiquarian and amateur scientist

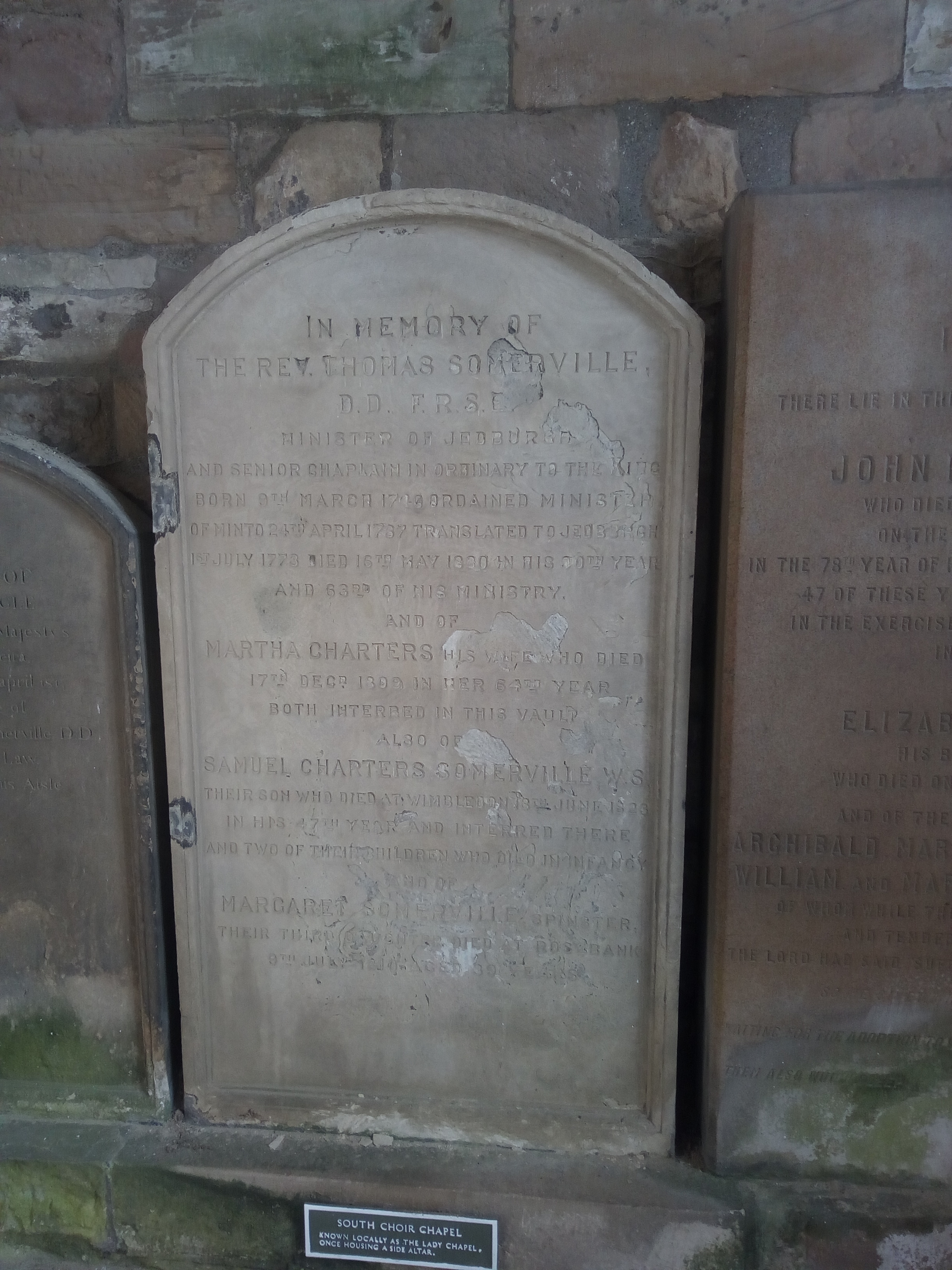
- Memorial in Jedburgh Abbey
- Born: 9 March 1740; Hawick, Scotland
- Died: 16 May 1830 (aged 90); Jedburgh, Scotland
- Occupation: minister

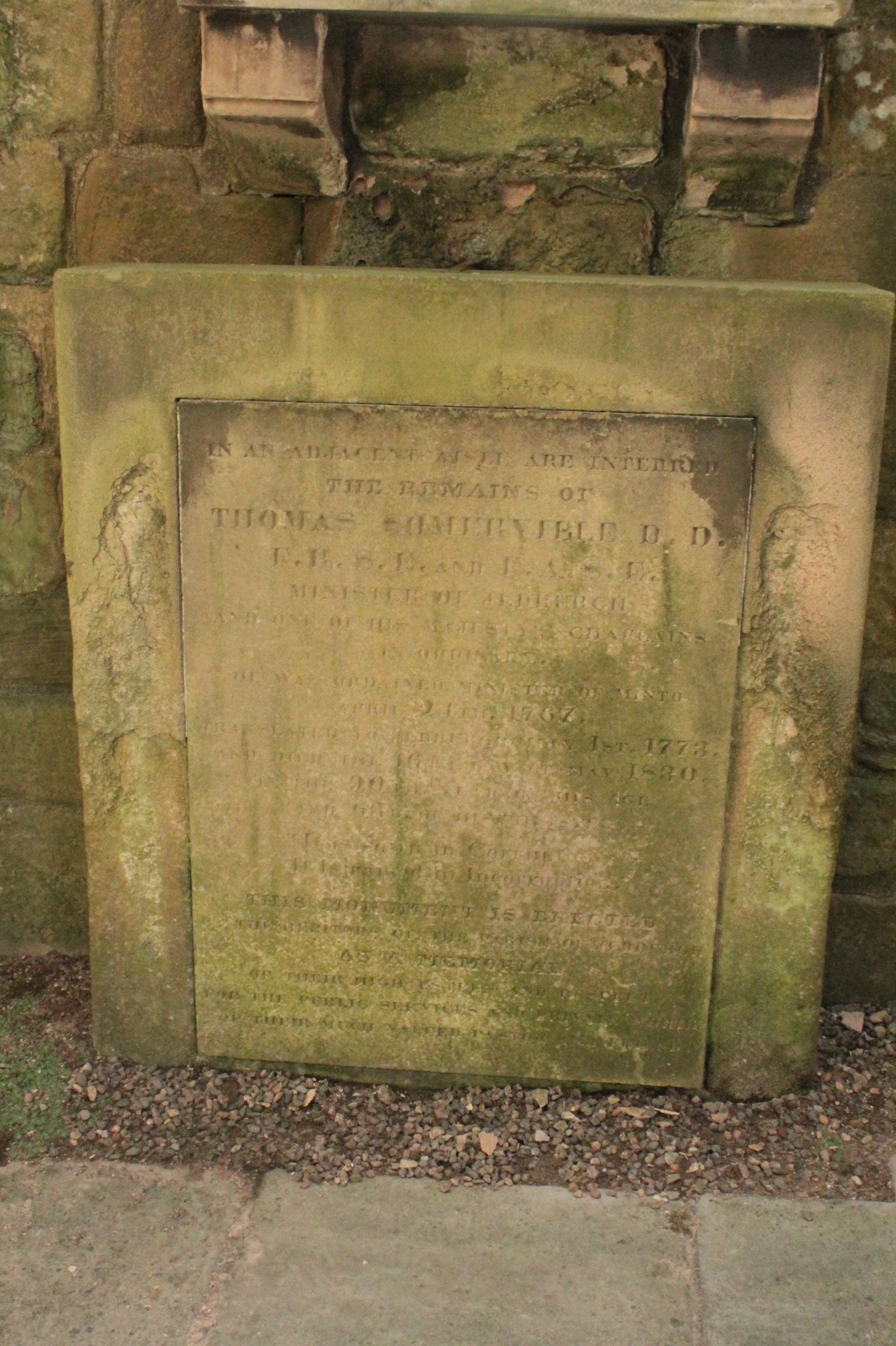
The grave of Rev Thomas Somerville, Melrose Abbey

Thomas Somerville FSA Scot FRSE (9 March 1740 – 16 May 1830) was a Scottish minister in Jedburgh, an antiquarian and an amateur scientist. From 1793 until his death he was King's Chaplain in Scotland. He was the uncle and he also became the father-in-law to the scientist Mary Somerville who was known as "The Rose of Jedburgh".

== Life ==
He was born on 9 March 1740 in the manse at Hawick in the Scottish Borders the son of Janet Grierson and her husband, Rev William Somerville (d.1757). He was educated in Hawick Parish School. On the death of his father he and his two sisters were left in the care of a family friend, Mr Cranstoun of Ancrum.

He then studied divinity at the University of Edinburgh. He was licensed to preach by the Church of Scotland in 1764. In Edinburgh he fell from his horse near the house of Rev Bain, minister of the Relief Church and spent months living there recovering. He had an aversion to horses for the rest of his life.

He did not get a post as a minister immediately and whilst awaiting a church acted as tutor to the children of Sir Gilbert Elliot, 3rd Baronet, of Minto, later Governor General of India. In 1767 Sir Gilbert appointed him minister of the local parish church at Minto, probably on the death of the previous minister. In 1772 he transferred from Minto to Jedburgh and remained there for the rest of his life.

In May 1787 Somerville met the poet Robert Burns during his stay in Jedburgh. Burns complained that Somerville was "sadly addicted to punning". Somerville claimed that Burns presented him with a gold-topped cane during his visit. This is unlikely, and although Somerville owned a gold-topped cane it was likely self-bought.

The University of St Andrews awarded him an honorary doctorate (DD) in 1789. In 1793 he was elected a Fellow of the Royal Society of Edinburgh. His proposers were Andrew Dalzell, James Hutton, and Rev John Hill.

He died following a short illness in the manse at Jedburgh on 16 May 1830 aged 90. He is buried in the grounds of Jedburgh Abbey on the south side of the nave and with a further memorial within the Lady Chapel.

== Family ==
In 1770 he married Martha Charters (d.1809). They had at least six children including William Somerville who later married their niece Mary Greig (née Fairfax). Mary Somerville spent much of her childhood with them and she was known as "The Rose of Jedburgh".

== Publications ==
- History of Political Transactions and Parties from Charles II to King William (1792)
- On the Constitution and State of Great Britain (1793)
- The History of Great Britain During the Reign of Queen Anne (1798)
- My Own Life and Times (1814)
- A Collection of Sermons (1815)
