= Hoad Monument =

Tower for Sir John Barrow in Cumbria, England

Sir John Barrow Monument (on Hoad Hill)
- Sir John Barrow Monument
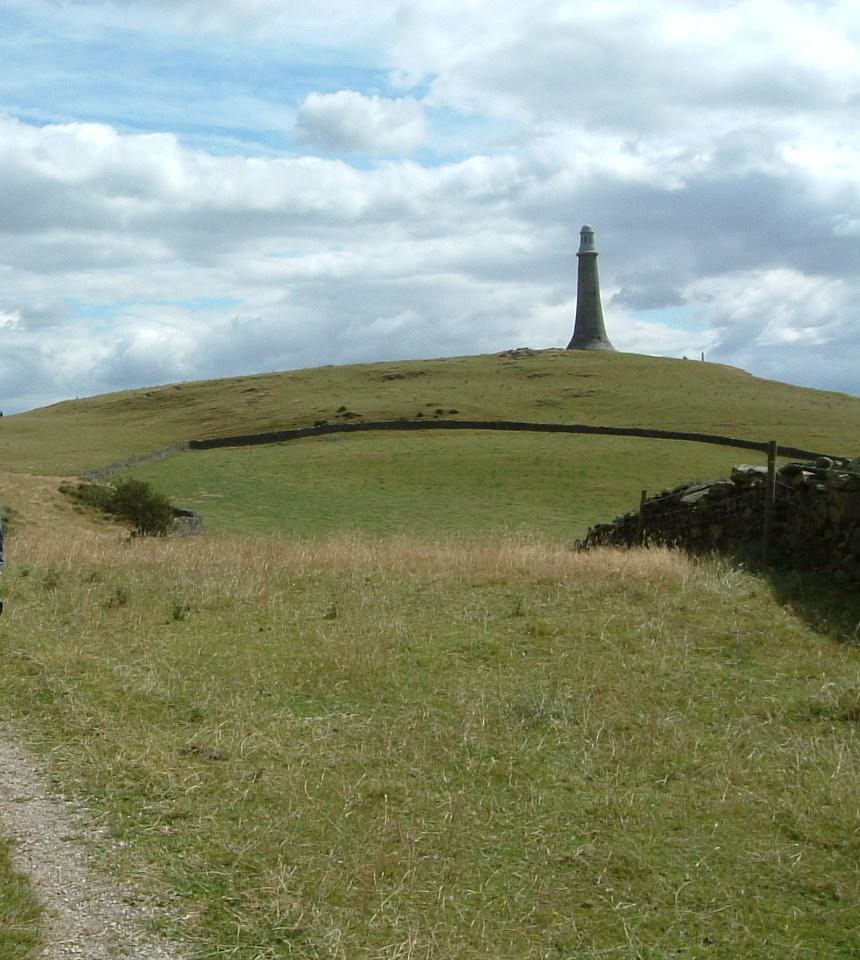
- The monument in 2005
- Interactive map of Sir John Barrow Monument (on Hoad Hill)
- Location: Ulverston, Cumbria, England
- Coordinates: 54°12′09″N 3°04′58″W
- Type: Tower
- Material: Limestone
- Height: 100 feet (30 m)
- Beginning date: 15 May 1850
- Completion date: 9 January 1851
- Dedicated to: Sir John Barrow, 1st Baronet

Sir John Barrow Monument (colloquially known as The Hoad) is a 100-foot (30 m) tower at the top of the 436-foot (133 m) Hoad Hill, near Ulverston in Cumbria, England. It commemorates Sir John Barrow (1764–1848), who was born in Ulverston. It was built in 1850 at a cost of £1,250, the cost being met mainly by public subscription.

Sir John Barrow was a founding member of the Royal Geographical Society. He travelled to China and South Africa as a diplomat and held the post of Second Secretary to the Admiralty from 1804 until 1845.

== Description ==
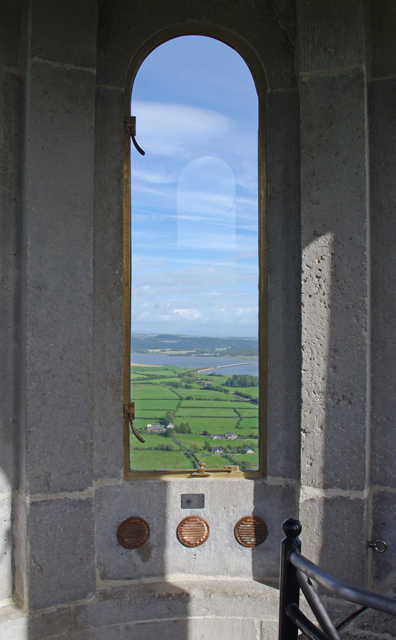
The view from the top of the monument, 2010

The monument is not a lighthouse: it has never had a functional light. However, it was designed to resemble one, and is similar to the Third Eddystone Lighthouse (Smeaton's Tower). It is a Grade II* listed building, meaning that it is of more than local interest, and the monument stands as one of the symbols of the northwest of England.

It is built of limestone quarried locally at Birkrigg Common. Due to its elevated and exposed position, it is one of the most prominent landmarks in Cumbria. The hollow tower can be ascended via a spiral stone staircase of 112 steps. At the top, eight apertures provide a 360-degree panorama of the Furness Peninsula, Morecambe Bay and the southern Lake District. In recent times the formerly open apertures have been glazed.

The tower is also occasionally referred to as "the pepper pot". This epithet was famously used by Lord Haw-Haw in one of his propaganda broadcasts during World War II when he warned the residents of Ulverston that the German Air Force would bomb their pepper pot.

Hoad Monument is normally open on Sundays and Bank Holidays between April and October, when a flag is flying outside the monument. The monument itself is owned and maintained by Ulverston Town Council, while Hoad Hill is owned by Ulverston Towns Lands Trust.

== Restoration ==
In 2009/2010 the monument underwent a £1.2 million restoration. The majority of funding came in the form of a £891,000 grant from the Heritage Lottery Fund, with the Friends of the Sir John Barrow Monument collecting grants and donations for the rest.

The restoration included a series of structural improvements to make the monument watertight, the most noticeable of these being the addition of a copper roof covering the stone dome, which was itself removed and rebuilt.

The official reopening was on Sunday 22 August 2010 and was marked by a gala at Ford Park, barn dance and firework display.

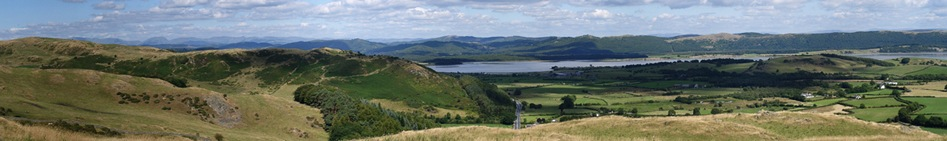
Panoramic view from Hoad Hill over the Leven Estuary.

== See also ==
- Grade II* listed buildings in Westmorland and Furness
- Listed buildings in Ulverston
