= Robert Batty (physician) =

English physician

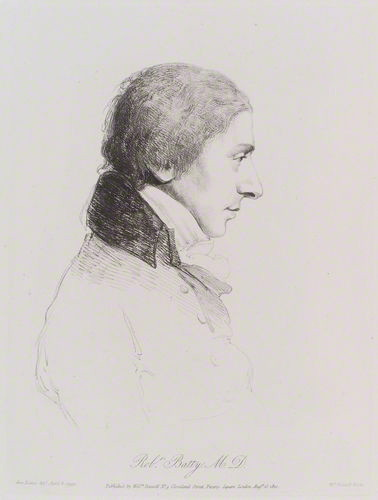
Robert Batty (1810) by William Daniell

Robert Batty, M.D. (14 December 1763 Kirkby Lonsdale, Westmorland – 16 November 1849 Fairlight Lodge, Hastings, East Sussex), was an English physician.

Batty was born at Kirkby Lonsdale, Westmoreland. He graduated M.D. at the university of St. Andrews on 30 August 1797, shortly after which he settled in London as obstetric physician. On 30 September 1800, he was admitted by the College of Physicians, a licentiate in midwifery, and on 22 December 1806 a licentiate of the college. He was physician to the Lying-in Hospital, Brownlow Street, and for some years acted as editor of the 'Medical and Physical Journal.' Like his son, Colonel Robert Batty, he was long known as an amateur artist.

His daughter, Elizabeth (1791–1875), was married to Philip Martineau, a Master in Chancery. Their son was the English painter, Robert Braithwaite Martineau (1826–1869).

He spent his last years at Fairlight Lodge, Hastings, where he died on 16 November 1849 at the age of eighty-five. His portrait by Dance was engraved by Daniell.
