= John Barrow (civil servant) =

British government employee and author

John Barrow FRS FRGS FSA
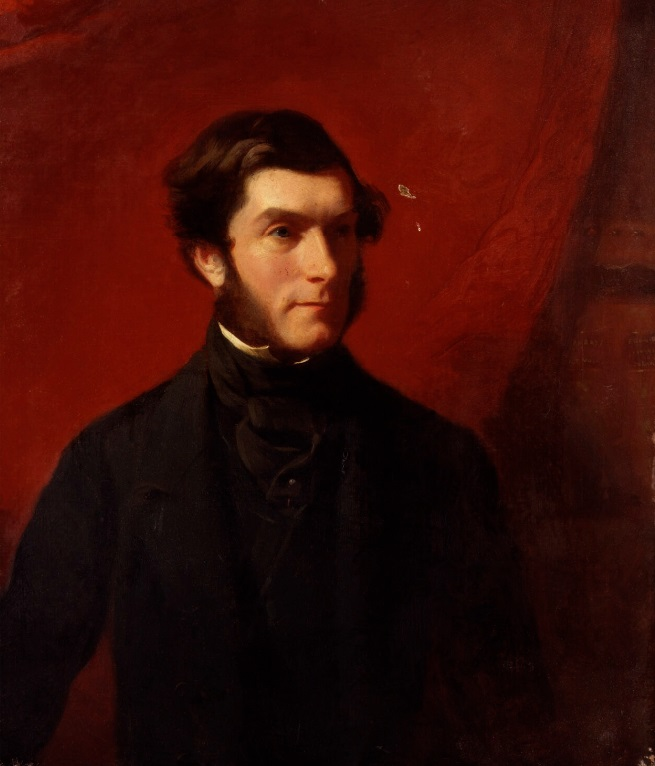
- John Barrow in 1851, by Stephen Pearce

Personal details
- Born: 28 June 1808 London, England
- Died: 9 December 1898 (aged 90) Kingham, Oxfordshire, England
- Resting place: Kensal Green Cemetery
- Parents: Sir John Barrow (father); Anna Maria Truter (mother)

John Barrow (28 June 1808 – 9 December 1898) was an English clerk and author.

== Early life ==
John Barrow was born on 28 June 1808 as the second surviving son of Second Secretary to the Admiralty John Barrow (who would not be created a Baronet until 1835) and his wife Anna Maria. The family lived on Upper Grosvenor Street in Mayfair, London. Barrow Jr.'s surviving siblings were Johanna Maria (b. 1801), George (b. 1806), William (b. 1810), Mary Jane (b. 1811), and Peter Barrow (b. 1813).

Together with his older brother George Barrow, John Barrow Jr. was educated at Charterhouse School from January 1819 until May 1824.

== Career ==
On 17 November 1824, he began his career at the Admiralty as a Third Class Clerk. He was promoted to Second Class Clerk on 20 July 1832, and First Class Clerk/Chief of the Record Office on 4 May 1844. The latter promotion was in recognition of Barrow's labours in re-arranging and preserving valuable Admiralty records going back to 1688, which had previously been neglected and inadequately stored.

Like his father, John Barrow Jr. had a great interest in Arctic exploration. When the 1845 Arctic Expedition under Sir John Franklin went missing, Barrow Jr. was indefatigable in his efforts to promote the search and support the officers and men who went on the search expeditions. Barrow Jr.'s close friend Captain James Fitzjames was the third in command of the Franklin Expedition.

== Later life ==
After his retirement from the Admiralty on 21 March 1857, Barrow joined the 38th Middlesex (Artists') Volunteer Rifle Corps in 1860 as a Private and ultimately attained the rank of Lieutenant-Colonel of the 18th Middlesex Rifle Volunteer Corps in 1882. He also seriously took up mountaineering and was elected a member of the Alpine Club in 1861 after his successful ascent of Mont Blanc. In 1864, he acquired a second home in Kingham, Oxfordshire, which he named Monte Rosa after the mountain he ascended in 1862.

== Travels and publications ==
Every summer during his working life, Barrow took a few months' leave and travelled extensively to places such as Iceland, Russia, Norway and Switzerland. His interesting and amusing observations from many of these travels were later published. Besides travel books, he also wrote naval historical works.

- A family tour through South Holland: up the Rhine, and across the Netherlands, to Ostend. London: John Murray. 1831.
- Excursions in the North of Europe, through Parts of Russia, Finland, Sweden, Denmark and Norway. London: John Murray. 1834.
- A Visit to Iceland, by Way of Tronyem, in the "Flower of Yarrow" Yacht, in the Summer of 1834. London: John Murray. 1835.
- A Tour Round Ireland, through the Sea-Coast Counties, in the Autumn of 1835. London: John Murray. 1836.
- Tour in Austrian Lombardy, the Northern Tyrol, and Bavaria, in 1840. London: John Murray. 1841.
- The Life, Voyages, and Exploits of Sir Francis Drake; with Numerous Original Letters from Him and the Lord High Admiral to the Queen and Great Officers of State. London: John Murray. 1843.
- Memoirs of the Naval Worthies of Queen Elizabeth's Reign; of Their Gallant Deeds, Daring Adventures, and Services, in the Infant State of the British Navy; with Brief Biographical Notices of the Respective Commanders. London: John Murray. 1845.
- The Life and Correspondence of Admiral Sir William Sidney Smith, G.C.B. London: Richard Bentley. 1848.
- A private memoir of the life and services of the late William Barrow, Esq. (Commander H.M.S. Rose) Commander Royal Navy. Privately printed. 1851.
- The Geography of Hudson's Bay; Being the Remarks of Captain W. Coats, in Many Voyages to That Locality, Between the Years 1727 and 1751. Hakluyt Society. 1851.
- Tour on the Continent, by Rail and Road, in the Summer of 1852, Through Northern Germany, Austria, Tyrol, Austrian Lombardy, &c. London: Longman, Brown, Green, and Longmans. 1853.
- Summer tours in Central Europe 1853-4. Bavaria, Austrian Tyrol, North Italy, Savoy, Piedmont, &c.,. London: W. H. Dalton. 1855.
- Captain Cook's Voyages of Discovery. Edinburgh: Adam and Charles Black. 1860.
- Expeditions on the Glaciers: Including an Ascent of Mont Blanc, Monte Rosa, Col Du Geant, and Mont Buet. By a Private of the Thirty Eighth Artists', and Member of the Alpine Club. London: E. & F.N. Spon, and Dalton and Lucy. 1864.
- Mountain Ascents in Westmoreland & Cumberland. London: Sampson Lowe, Marston, Searle & Rivington. 1886. Second Edition, enlarged and revised, 1888.
