= Robert Batty (artist) =

English army officer

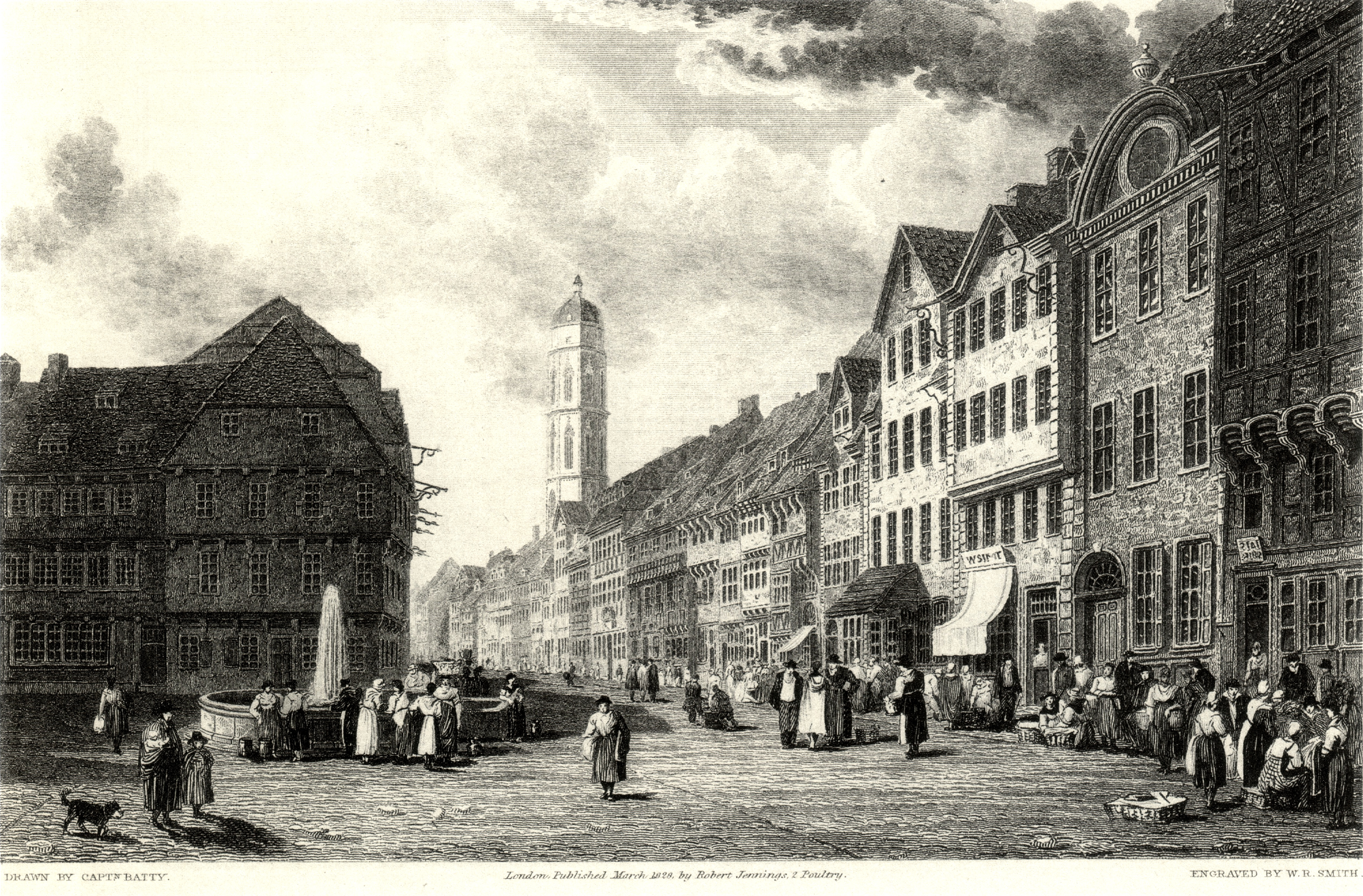
Market Place and Weender Strasse at Göttingen. Drawing by Batty, engraved in 1828 by W. R. Smith.

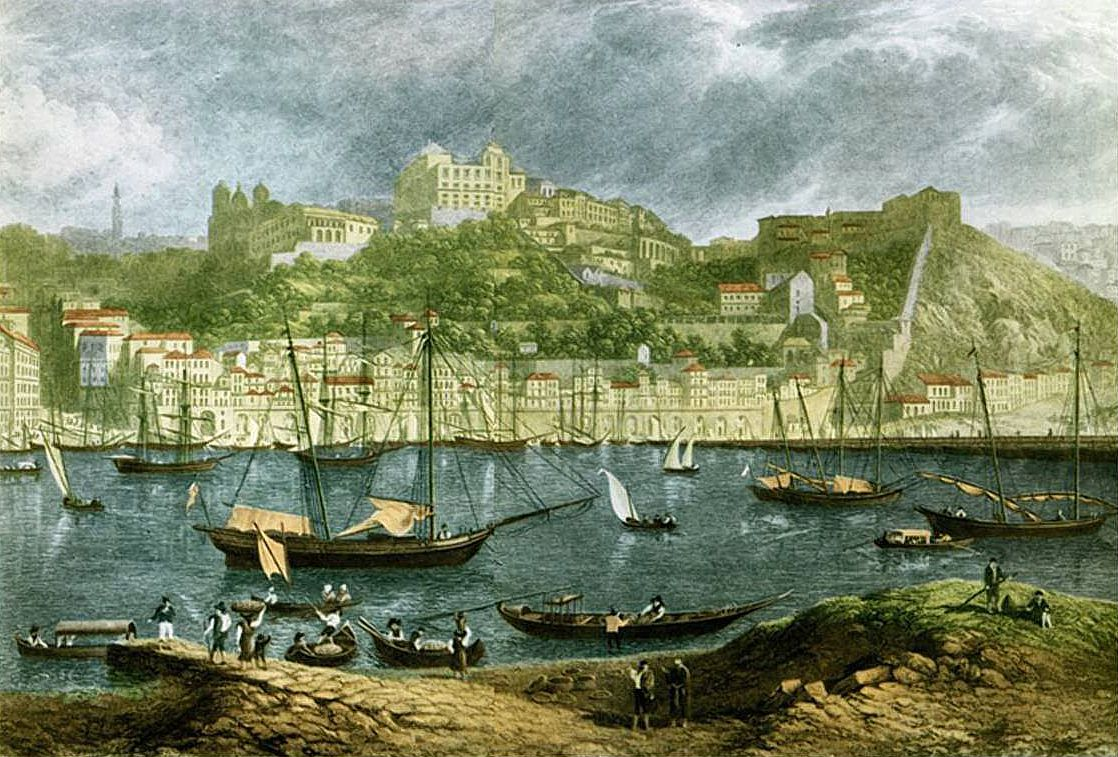
1823 view of Oporto

Lieutenant-Colonel Robert Batty (5 August 1789 – 20 November 1848) was an English army officer and artist.

== Life ==
He was born 1789, the son of Dr. Batty of Hastings and started to study medicine at Caius College, Cambridge, being awarded an M.B. in 1813. He left his studies to join the Grenadier Guards (then the 1st Foot Guards), with whom he served in the campaign of the Western Pyrenees and at Waterloo, where he was wounded and wrote an account of the Battle of Waterloo in a series of letters. He later published an illustrated account of his experiences and was elected a Fellow of the Royal Society in 1822.

He was an amateur artist of considerable merit and from 1822 to 1833 travelled the continent drawing and painting. He published in 1822 French Scenery; in 1823 German Scenery and Welsh Scenery; in 1826 Scenery of the Rhine, Belgium, and Holland all of which have been much esteemed; in 1828 Hanoverian, Saxon, and Danish Scenery; and in 1832 Select Views of the principal Cities of Europe. These were published during his period of service. Between 1825 and 1832 he periodically exhibited at the Royal Academy.

He suffered from paralysis and died in London in 1848, painting until a few weeks before his death. He had in 1821 married Johanna Maria, one of the daughters of Sir John Barrow and the artist Anna Maria Truter. The marriage produced 5 children:

1. Anna Maria Harriotte Batty Birth 1823 Death 1 March 1891 (Age 68) -- Hampstead, London
2. Rev. Robert Braithwaite Batty Birth about 1828 Death 22 June 1861 (Age 33) -- Amritsar, India
3. Johanna Batty Birth 1831—London Death 1894 (Age 63) -- London
4. Laura Batty Birth 1832—London Death 12 November 1909 (Age 77) -- 7 Cumberland Terrace, Regent's Park, London
5. Edward Batty Birth 6 June 1839—Lyme Road, Axminster, Devon Death 2 April 1918 (Age 78) -- Dawlish, Devon

== Bibliography ==
- Batty, (Capt. Robert) An Historical Sketch of the Campaign of 1815 illustrated by Plans of Operations & the Battles of Quatre Bras, Ligny & Waterloo. '
- Batty, (Capt. Robert, 1st or Grenadier Guards) Campaign of the Left Wing of the Allied Army, in the Western Pyrenees & South of France, in the Years 1813-1814, under Field-Marshal The Marquess of Wellington. Illustrated by a Detailed Plan of the Operations, & Numerous Plates of Mountain & River Scenery, Drawn & Etched by Captain Batty. Classic work on later stages of the war in the Peninsula, in which Batty participated as an ensign with 3rd Bn. Grenadier Guards: Siege of St. Sebastian, Bidassoa, Nive, Orthes, Bayonne &c.
- Ramm, John 'A Military Master', Antique Dealer & Collector's Guide, March 2000, Vol 53, No. 8
