= Anna Maria Truter =

Cape Colony botanical artist

- Born: 17 August 1777
- Died: 15 December 1857 (aged 80)
- Citizenship: South Africa
- Occupation: Botanical artist
- Spouse: Sir John Barrow, 1st Baronet
- Children: 7
- Father: Petrus Johannes Truter
- Family: George Barrow (Sir)

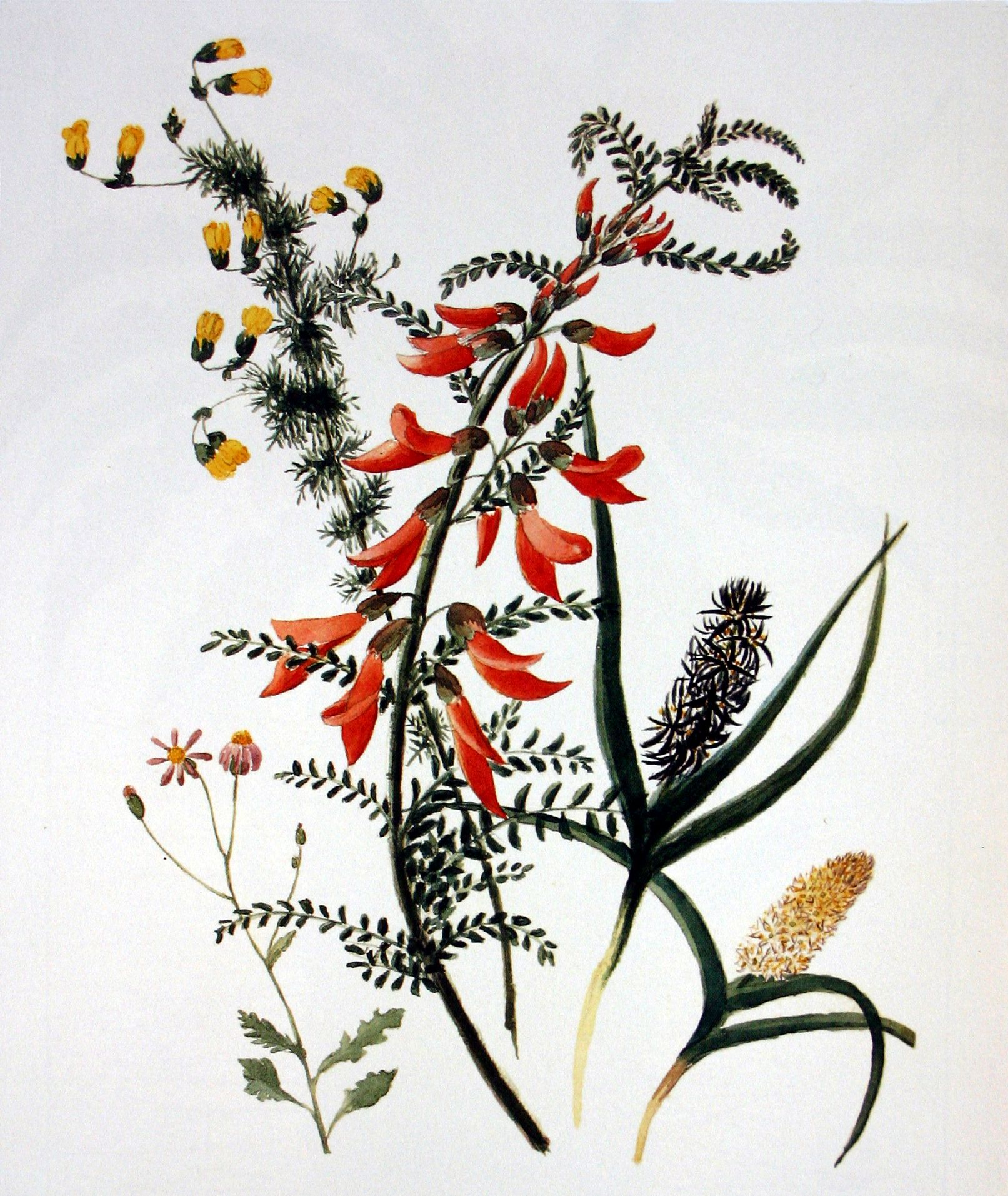
Sutherlandia frutescens, 2 species of Wurmbea, Hermannia pinnata and a small Senecio, c. 1800, pencil and watercolour

Anna Maria Truter, Lady Barrow (17 August 1777 – 15 December 1857) was a Cape Colony botanical artist. By the time she left the Cape in 1803, she had assembled the first known portfolio of Cape flower studies and landscapes. Her husband, Sir John Barrow, 1st Baronet, became Second Secretary to the Admiralty in 1804, and authored An Account of Travels into the Interior of Southern Africa, in the Years 1797 and 1798 (London, 1801).

She was the daughter of Petrus Johannes Truter (17 December 1747, Cape Town – 31 January 1825, Swellendam), an official in the East India Company, a Member of the Court of Justice, and a Commissioner of Police, who was married on 18 April 1773 to Johanna Ernestina Blankenberg (born 19 April 1750).

Anna Maria Truter and John Barrow had seven children:

1. George, who died aged 2 months
2. George Barrow (Sir) (22 October 1806, London – 1876), with his father one of the founders of the Royal Geographical Society, distinguished author and traveller. He married Rosamond Hester Elizabeth Pennell Croker (5 January 1810 – 10 January 1906), a celebrated beauty, painted by Sir Thomas Lawrence and a favourite of George IV and his court. She bore George Barrow eight children.
3. John Barrow, Lt. Col. V.D., F.R.S., F.R.G.S., F.S.A. (28 May 1808 – 26 February 1898), Chipping, Norton, Oxfordshire. Archivist to the Admiralty.
4. William Barrow, Commander (25 February 1810 – 26 February 1838)
5. Peter Barrow (born 30 July 1813), Consul of Nantes and later Kertch.
6. Johanna Maria, married in 1821 to Robert Batty of the Grenadier Guards, later a Lt. Col. Served in the Pyrenees and later at Waterloo where he was wounded. An artist, exhibited at the Royal Academy between 1813 and 1848, died 20 April 1848, Ampthill Square, London, aged 57 years.
7. Mary Jane (died 2 January 1878), unmarried.
