= Cape John Barrow =

Cape in the Qikiqtaaluk, Nunavut, Canada

- Cape
- Coordinates: 79°49′N 71°00′W
- Location: Ellesmere Island, Nunavut, Canada
- Offshore water bodies: Kane Basin
- Topo map: NTS 29G14 (untitled)

Cape John Barrow is located on Ellesmere Island in the Qikiqtaaluk Region of Nunavut, Canada. The cape, which extends into the Kane Basin was named after Arctic explorer, Sir John Barrow, 1st Baronet.
