= Cape Barrow (Nunavut) =

Cape in the Kitikmeot, Nunavut, Canada

- Cape
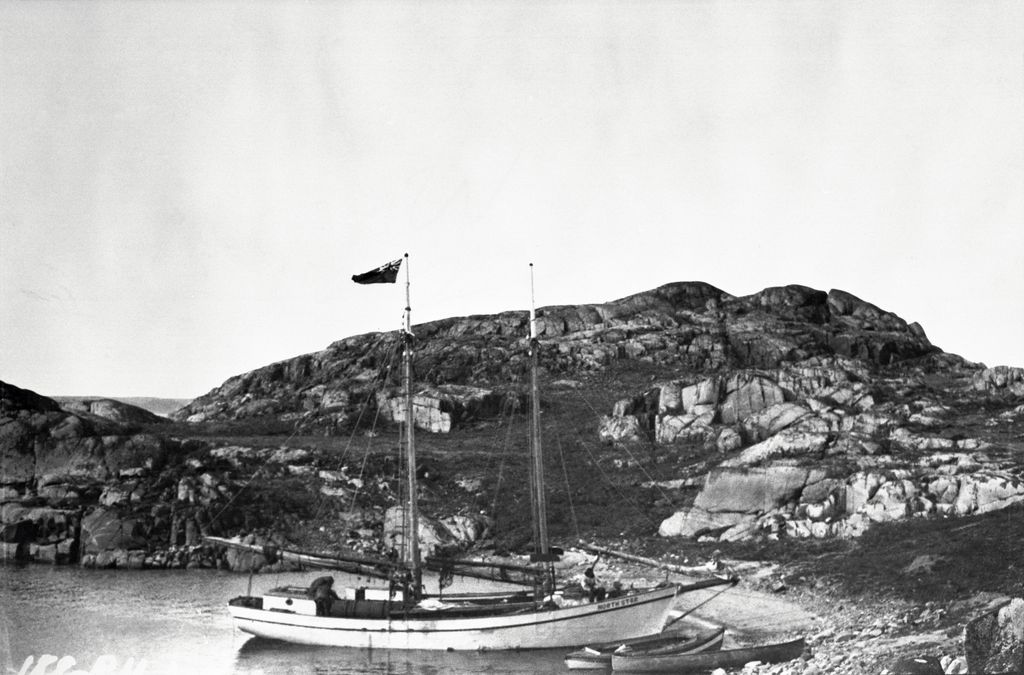
- CAE schooner 'North Star' at shore in Cape Barrow

- Location within Nunavut
- Coordinates: 68°01′N 110°08′W
- Location: Nunavut, Canada
- Water bodies: Coronation Gulf, Bathurst Inlet
- Topo map: NTS 77B3 Cape Barrow

Cape Barrow is a cape which separates Coronation Gulf from Bathurst Inlet in Nunavut, Canada. It is named in honour of the Arctic explorer Sir John Barrow, 1st Baronet, and is referred to as Haninnek by the local Inuit.

Along with Cape Flinders, it was named in 1821 by Sir John Franklin.

== Gallery ==
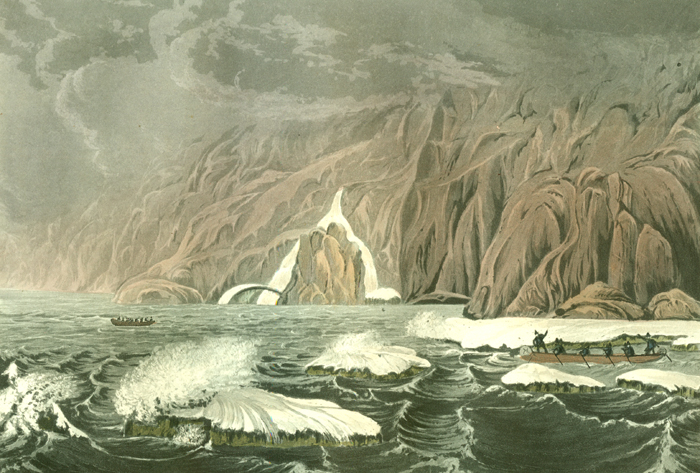
Expedition Doubling Cape Barrow, July 25, 1821, as depicted in Journey to the Shores of the Polar Sea in the years 1819, 20, 21 and 22, by John Franklin

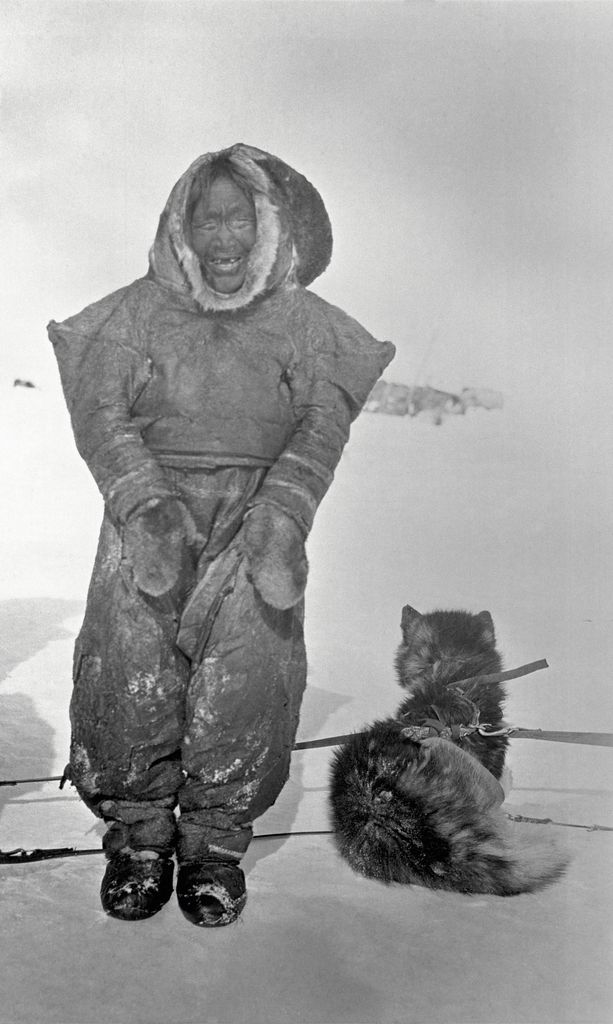
Akana, Umingmuktogmiut woman in Cape Barrow

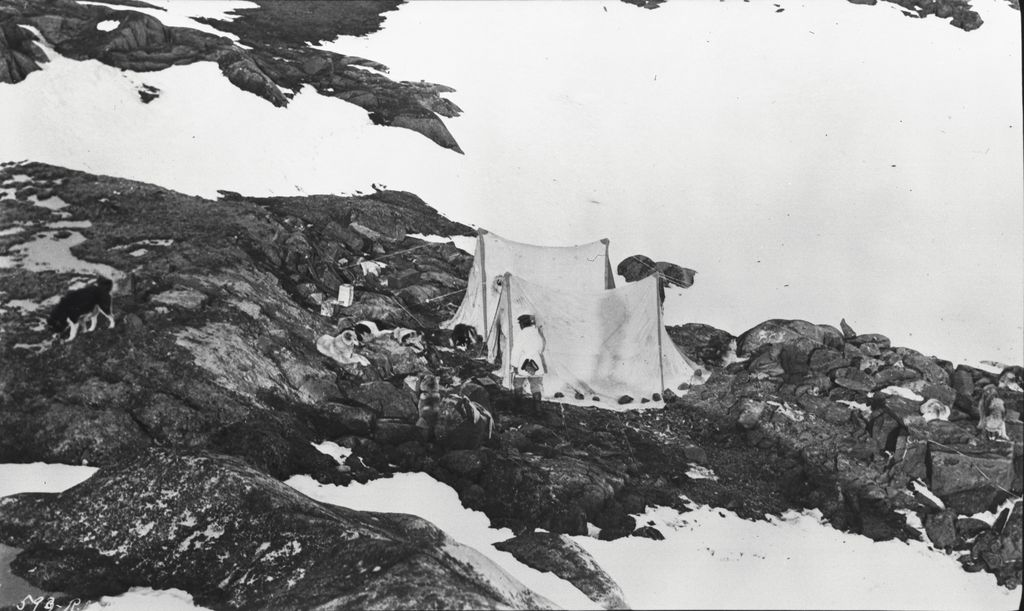
Camp in harbour at Cape Barrow, Northwest Territories (Nunavut)

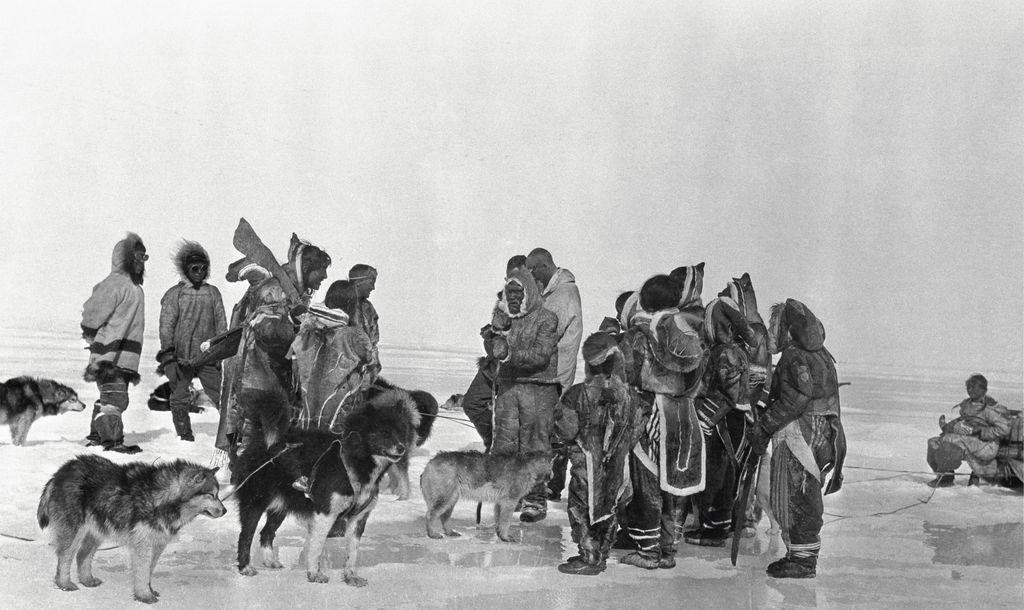
Inuit ice fishing at Cape Barrow, Northwest Territories (Nunavut)

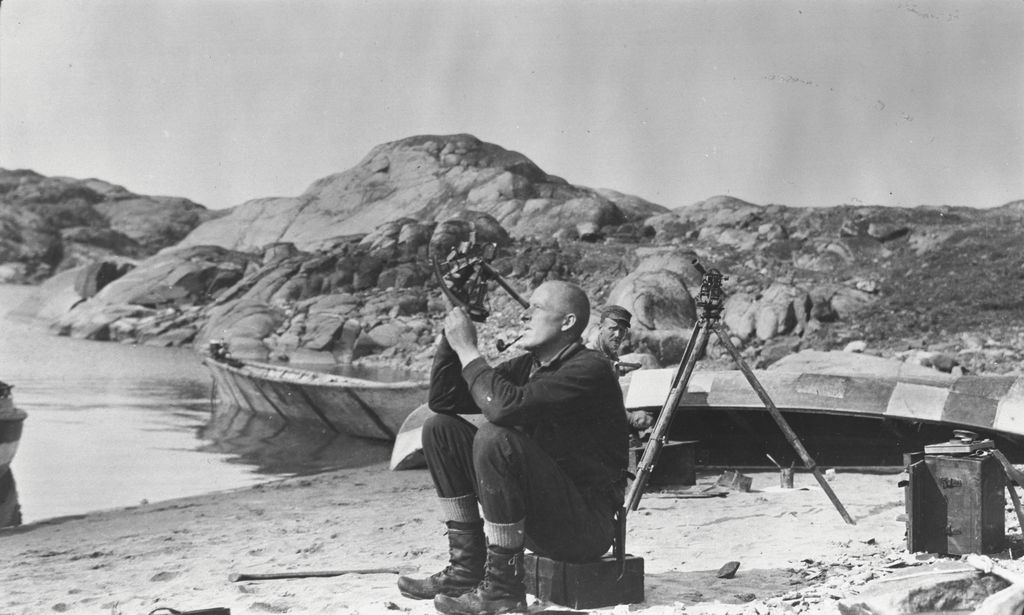
John Raffles Cox taking latitude with sextant at harbour at Cape Barrow
