= Barrow baronets =

Set index for Barrow baronets

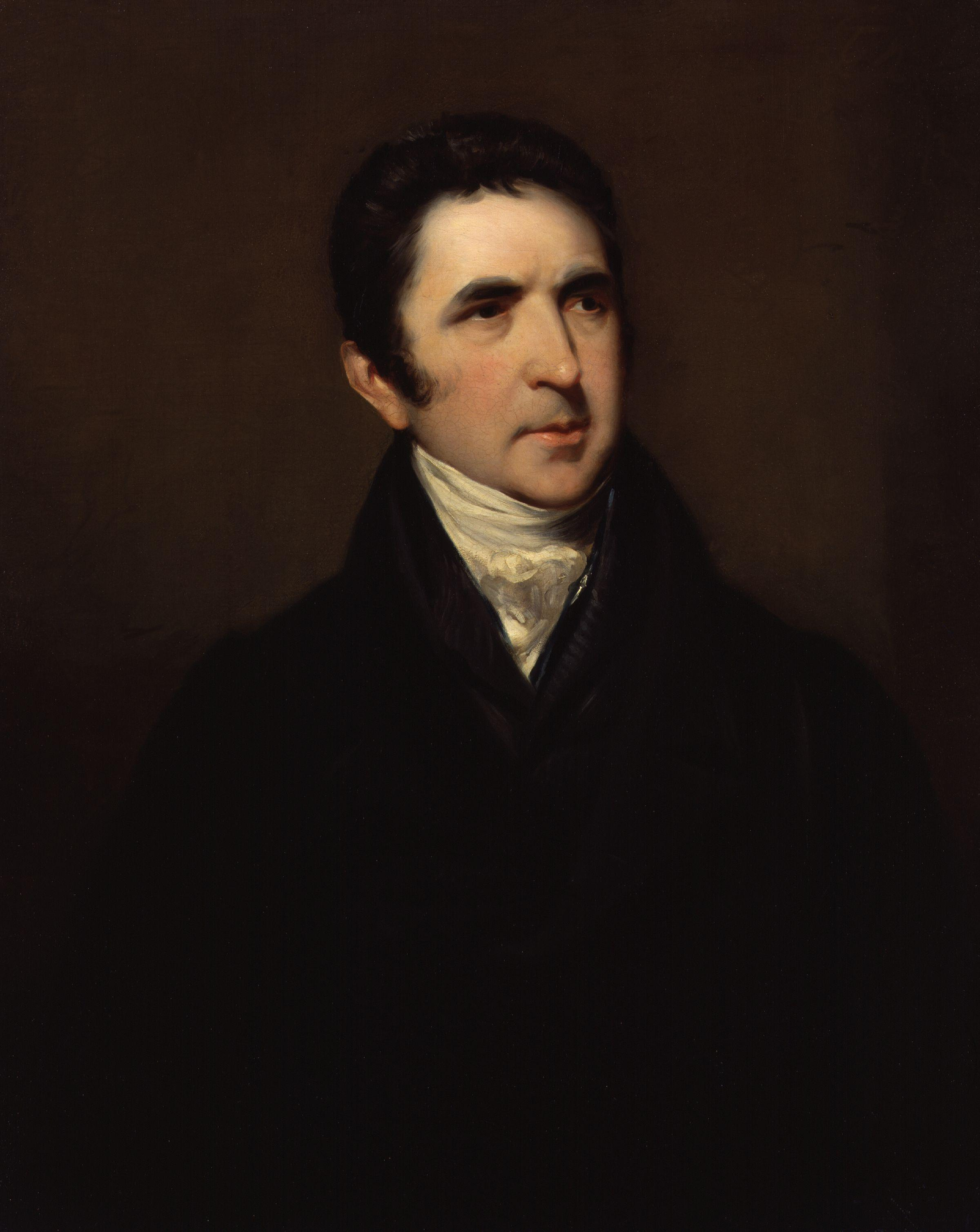
Sir John Barrow, 1st Baronet of Ulverstone

There have been two baronetcies created for persons with the surname Barrow, one in the Baronetage of Great Britain and one in the Baronetage of the United Kingdom.

- Barrow baronets of Hygrove (1784): see Crawley-Boevey baronets
- Barrow baronets of Ulverstone (1835)
