= Stephen Pearce =

English painter (1819–1904)

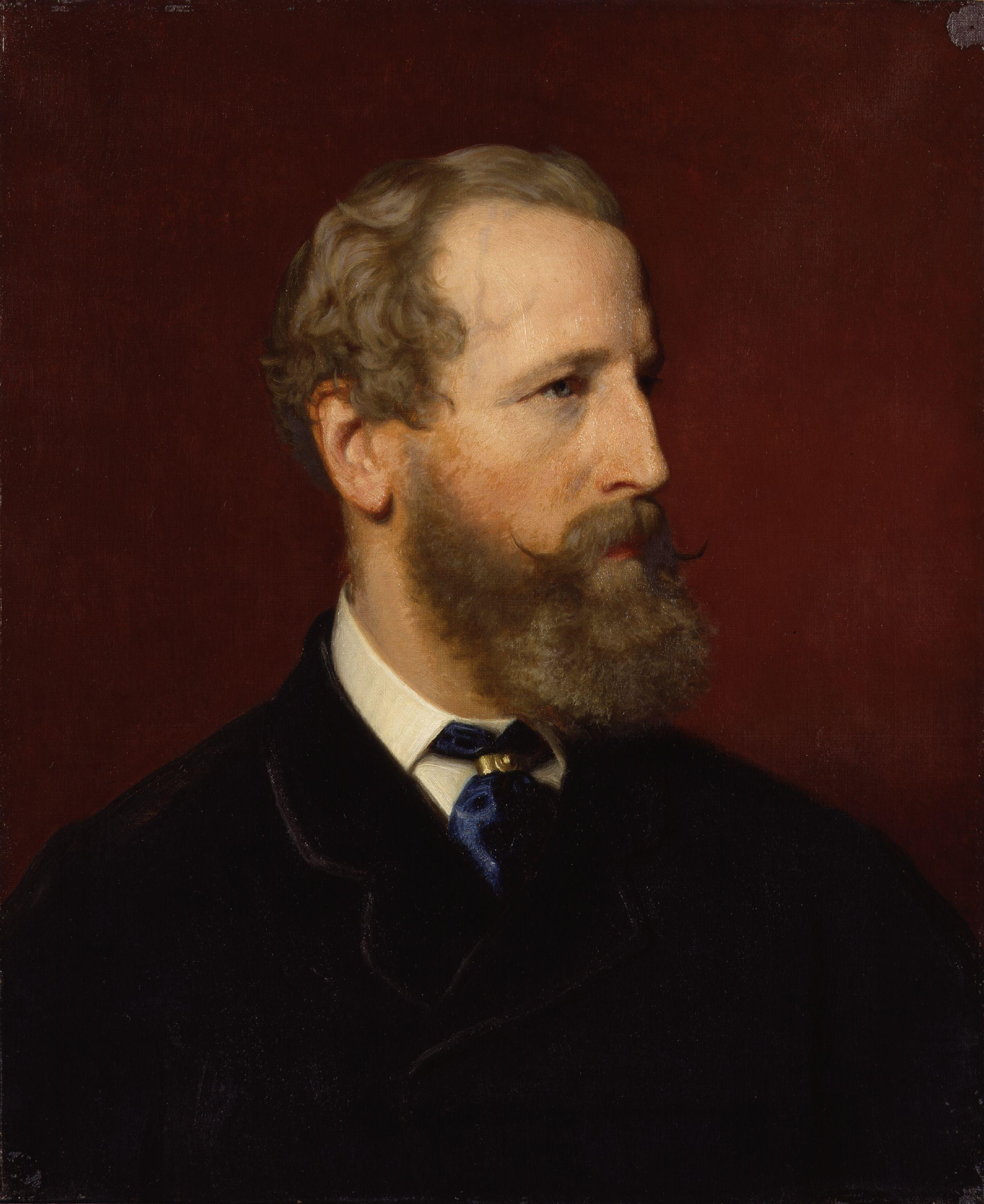
- Self portrait
- Born: 16 November 1819; King's Mews, London, England
- Died: 31 January 1904 (aged 84); Paddington, London, England
- Education: Martin Archer Shee
- Spouse: Matilda Jane Cheswright

Stephen Pearce (16 November 1819 – 31 January 1904) was an English portrait and equestrian painter. Forty-four portraits which he painted are in the National Portrait Gallery, London, which also contains two self-portraits.

== Life ==
He was born on 16 November 1819 at the King's Mews, Charing Cross, was only child of Stephen Pearce, clerk in the department of the master of horse, and Ann Whittington.

He was trained at Sass's Academy in Charlotte Street, and at the Royal Academy schools, 1840, and in 1841 became a pupil of Sir Martin Archer Shee.

From 1842 to 1846, he acted as amanuensis to Charles Lever, and he afterwards visited Italy. Paintings by him of favourite horses in the royal mews (transferred in 1825 to Buckingham Palace) were exhibited at the Royal Academy in 1839 and 1841, and from 1849, on his return from Italy, till 1885 he contributed numerous portraits and equestrian paintings to Burlington House.

Early friendship with John Barrow (1808-1898), keeper of the admiralty records and son of Sir John Barrow, brought Pearce a commission to paint "The Arctic Council discussing a plan of search for Sir John Franklin". This work was completed in 1851 and depicted several noted explorers of the Royal Navy, all experienced in sailing Arctic waters, including Back. It was exhibited at the Royal Academy in 1853, and was engraved by James Scott. Pearce's painting increased the public interest in Franklin's fate.

Pearce also painted for Barrow half-length portraits of Sir Robert McClure, Sir Leopold McClintock, Sir George Nares, and Captain Penny in their Arctic dress, and a series of small portraits of other arctic explorers. Lady Jane Franklin commissioned a similar series, which passed at her death to Sophia Cracroft, her husband's niece. All these pictures are in the National Portrait Gallery, to which Barrow and Cracroft respectively bequeathed them. Pearce's other sitters included Barrow himself (for the Royal Society), Sir Francis Beaufort, Sir James Clark Ross (for Greenwich Hospital), Sir Edward Sabine, Sir George Gabriel Stokes, Charles Lever, Sims Reeves, Sir Erasmus Wilson (Hospital for Diseases of the Skin, Westgate-on-Sea, copied for the Royal College of Surgeons), and the seventh Duke of Bedford.

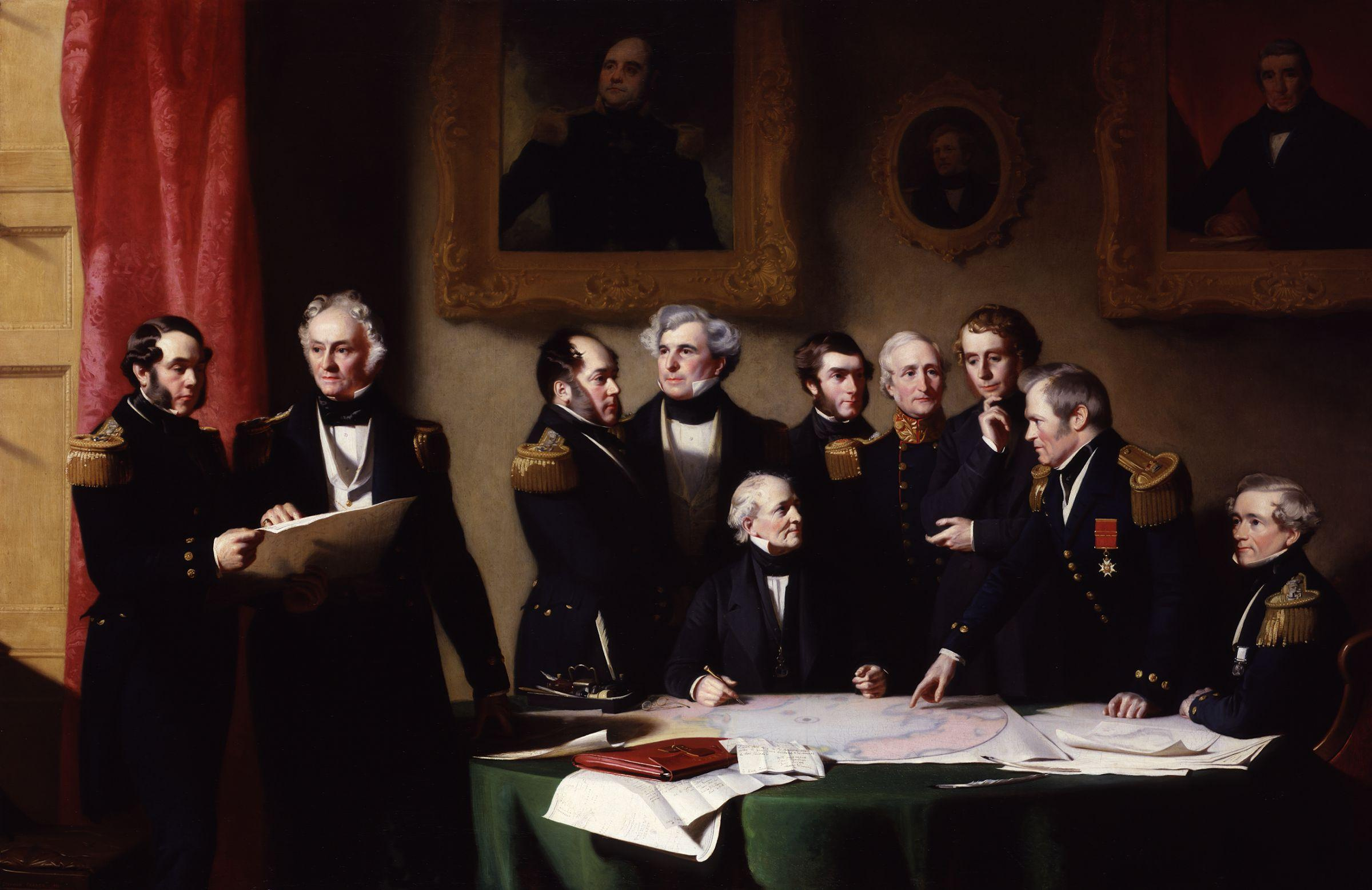
"The Arctic Council Planning a Search for Sir John Franklin", 1851.

Pearce was also widely known as a painter of equestrian presentation portraits and groups, the most important of which is the large landscape 'Coursing at Ashdown Park,' completed in 1869, and presented by the coursers of the United Kingdom to the Earl of Craven. For this picture, which measures ten feet long and contains about 60 equestrian portraits, including the Earl and Countess of Craven and members of the family, the Earls of Bective and Sefton, Lord and Lady Grey de Wilton, the artist received 1,000 guineas and 200 guineas for the copyright. Pearce painted equestrian portraits of many masters of foxhounds and harriers, as well as of the Earl of Coventry, Sir Richard and Lady Glyn, and of Mr. Burton on 'Kingsbridge' and Captain H. Coventry on 'Alcibiade,' winners of the Grand National.

Pearce retired from general practice in and from active work in 1888. He contributed 99 subjects to the Academy exhibitions, and about thirty of his pictures were engraved by J. Scott, C. Mottram, and others. His portraits, almost entirely of men, are accurate likenesses, and his horses and dogs are well drawn. The earlier paintings are somewhat tight in execution, with a tendency to over-emphasis of shadow, but the later pictures are freer in style.

Pearce's somewhat naive 'Memories of the Past,' published by him in 1903, contains nineteen reproductions from his paintings, a list of subjects painted, biographical and some technical notes. He died on 31 January 1904 at Sussex Gardens, West London, and was buried at the Old Town cemetery, Eastbourne. A portrait of himself he bequeathed to the National Portrait Gallery.

He married Matilda Jane Cheswright in 1858, who survived him with five sons.

== Galley ==
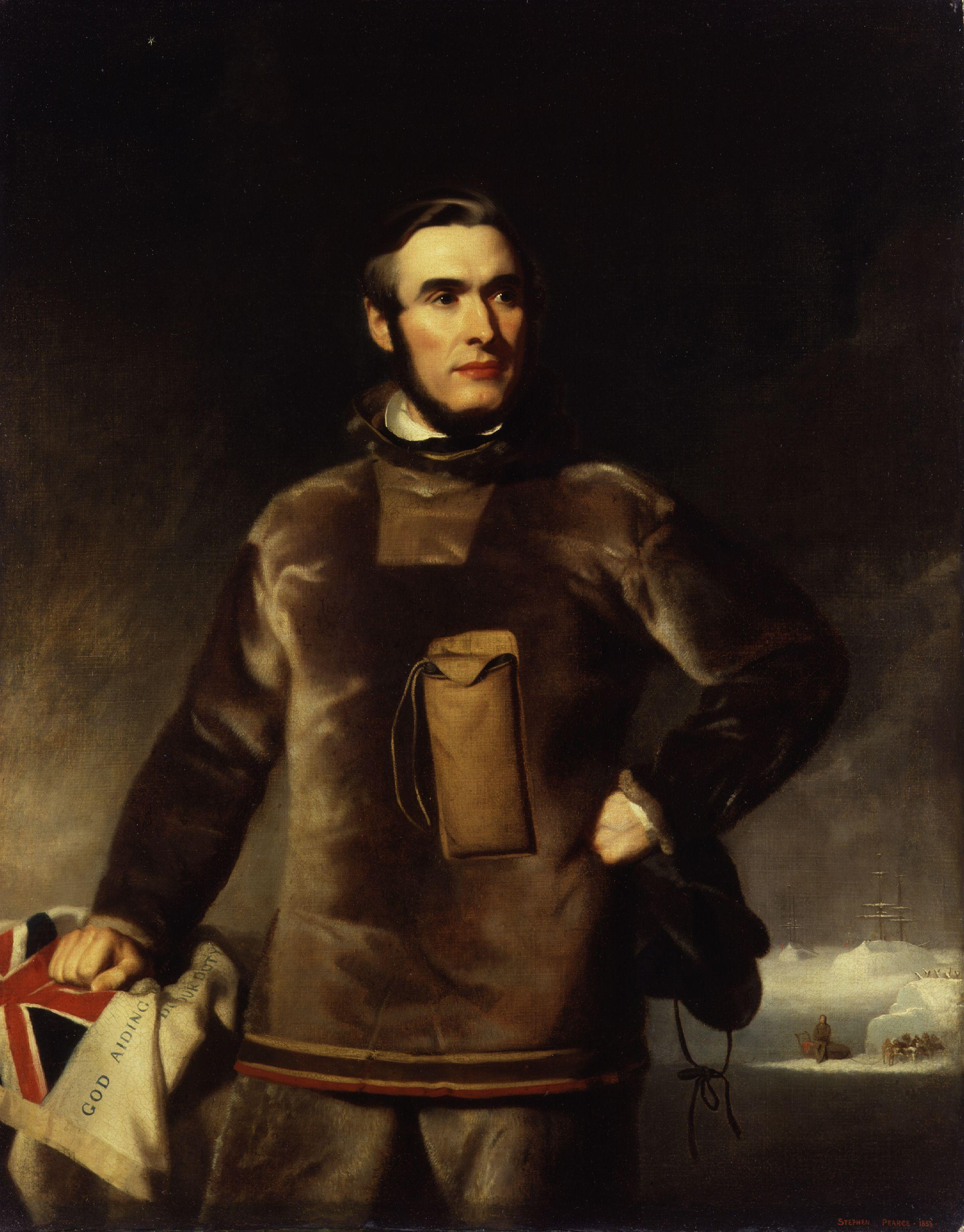
Portrait of William Penny, 1853

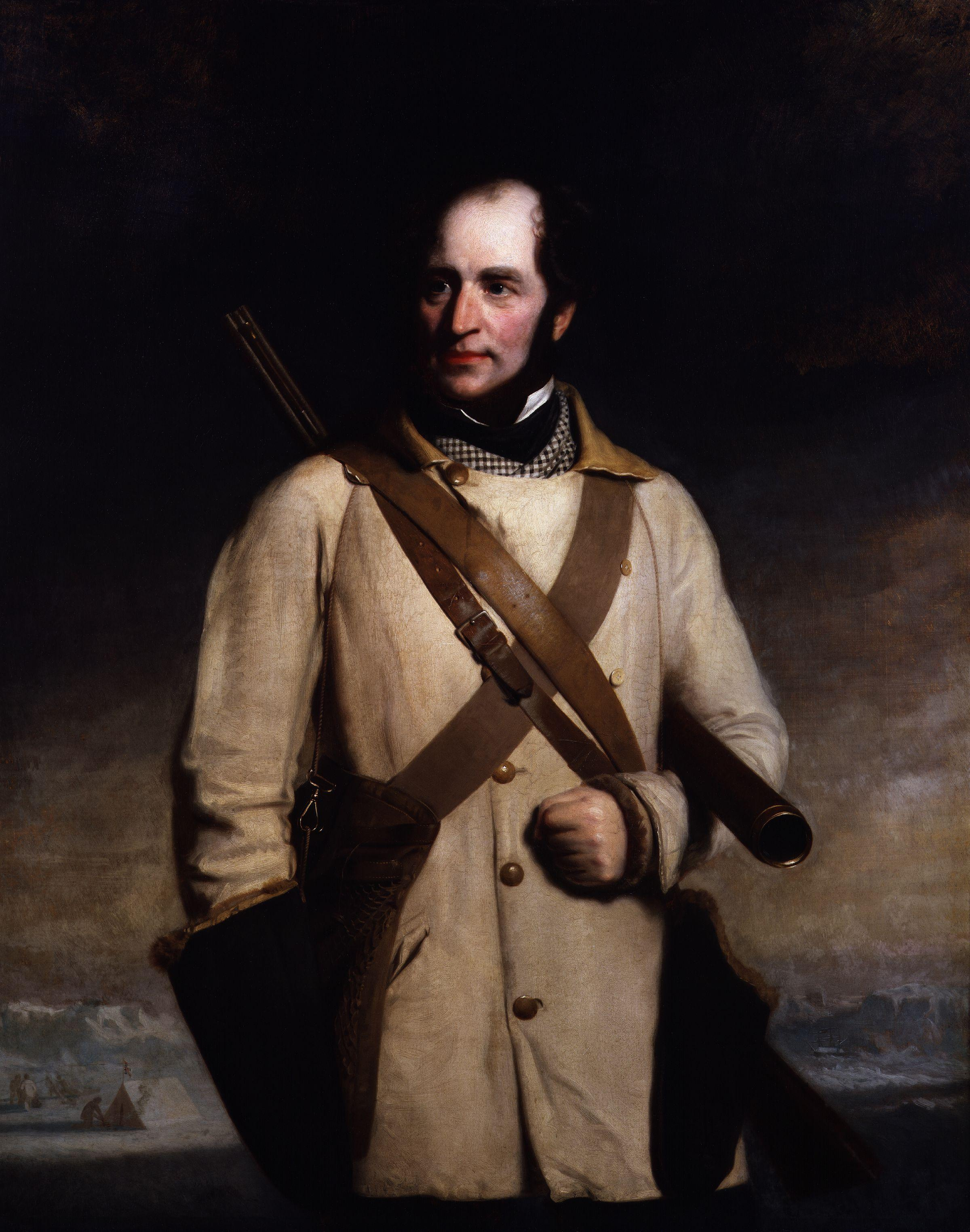
Portrait of Robert McClure, 1855

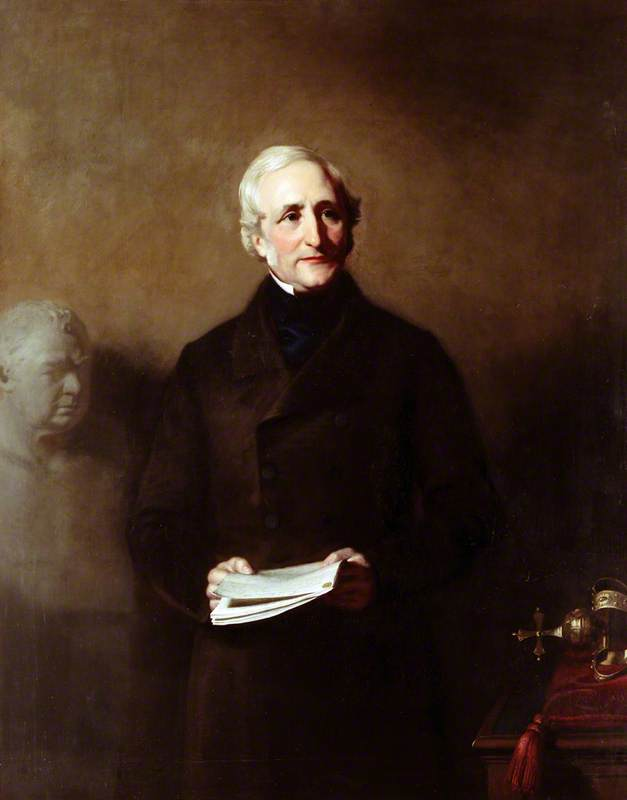
Portrait of Edward Sabine, 1855

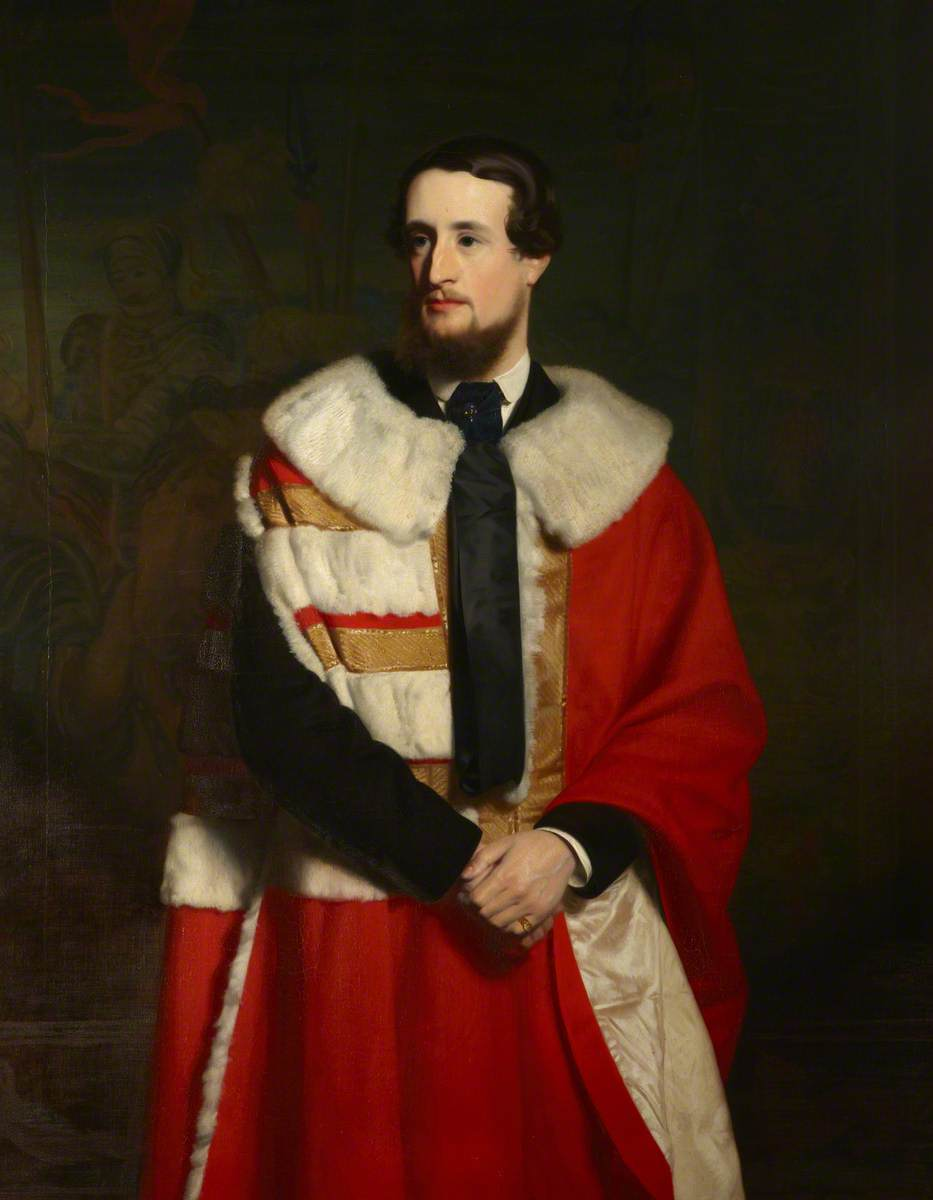
Portrait of the Earl of Belmore, 1857

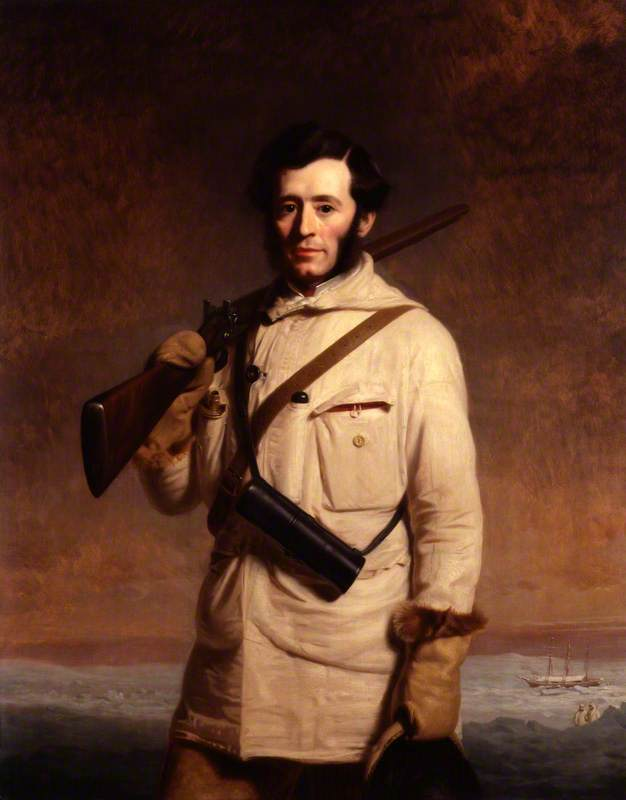
Portrait of Leopold McClintock, 1859
