= Science book =

Work of nonfiction usually written by a scientist

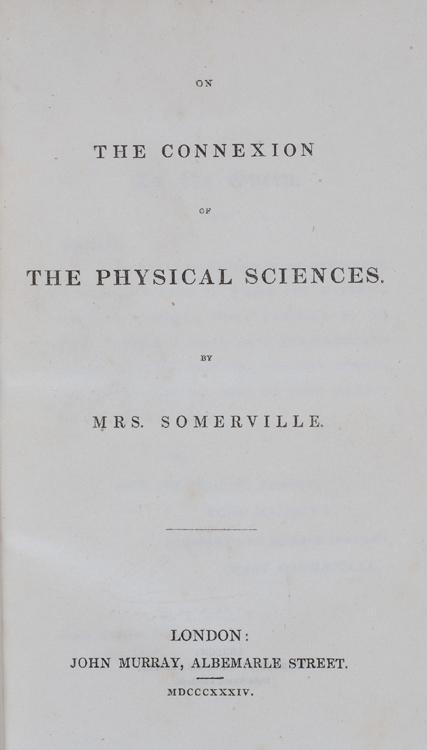
Title page of On the Connexion of the Physical Sciences (1834)

A science book is a work of nonfiction, usually written by a scientist, researcher, or professor like Stephen Hawking (A Brief History of Time), or sometimes by a non-scientist such as Bill Bryson (A Short History of Nearly Everything). Usually these books are written for a wide audience presumed to have a general education rather than a specifically scientific training, as opposed to the very narrow audience that a scientific paper would have, and are therefore referred to as popular science. As such, they require considerable talent on the part of the author to sufficiently explain difficult topics to people who are totally new to the subject, and a good blend of storytelling and technical writing. In the UK, the Royal Society Prizes for Science Books are considered to be the most prestigious awards for science writing. In the US, the National Book Awards briefly had a category for science writing in the 1960s, but now they just have the broad categories of fiction and nonfiction.

There are many disciplines that are well explained to lay people through science books. A few examples include Carl Sagan on astronomy, Jared Diamond on geography, Stephen Jay Gould and Richard Dawkins on evolutionary biology, David Eagleman on neuroscience, Donald Norman on usability and cognitive psychology, Steven Pinker, Noam Chomsky, and Robert Ornstein on linguistics and cognitive science, Donald Johanson and Robert Ardrey on paleoanthropology, and Desmond Morris on zoology and anthropology, and Fulvio Melia on black holes.

The roots of popular science writing can be traced back to the didactic poetry of Greek and Roman antiquity. During the Age of Enlightenment, many books were written that spread the new science to both experts and the educated public, but Mary Somerville's On the Connexion of the Physical Sciences (first edition 1834) was arguably the first book in the modern genre of popular science.

== Notable examples ==
- The Best American Science and Nature Writing – book series
- The Best American Science Writing – book series
- The Concise Encyclopedia of Science & Technology - encyclopedia

== See also ==
- List of science magazines
