= Cam's Delight (1741 ship) =

History

Great Britain
- Name: Cam's Delight
- Builder: Portsmouth, or "Frehm", or "Frnhm"
- Launched: 1741
- Fate: Sunk March 1838

General characteristics
- Tons burthen: Originally:50 (bm); 1798 on:78, or 84 (bm)
- Sail plan: Schooner
- Complement: 12 (1798)
- Armament: 6 × 2 or 3-pounder guns (1798)
- Notes: Single deck

Cam's Delight was built in Fareham (Portsmouth) in 1741. Although she spent some years trading with Africa, she spent most of her career as a coaster. She may have made occasional voyages further afield. She was wrecked in 1838, after having sailed for some 97 years.

== Career ==
Cam's Delight first appeared in Lloyd's Register (LR) in 1782 with W. Morris, master, Ireland & Co., owners, trade Guernsey–Bristol. She had undergone a thorough repair in 1775.

Capture and recapture: Lloyd's List (LL) reported on 13 September 1782 that a French privateer had captured Cam's Delight off Land's End and sent her to France. Cam's Delight, Morris, master, had been sailing from Bristol to Portsmouth. The next issue of LL reported that she had been retaken and brought into Portsmouth. An alternate report was that a French squadron had captured her but then had given her up.

Cam's Delight then disappeared from LR for some years. Still, a 1789 guide to Bristol listed Cam's Delight, Morris, master, as a constant trader between Bristol and Portsmouth.

Cam's Delight reentered LR in 1798 with G[eorge] Smyth, master, S.Teast, owner, and trade Bristol–Africa. She had undergone a good repair and lengthening in 1798. Although the Bristol–Africa trade usually signaled the slave trade, she was apparently not a slave ship. (Note: Also, Cam's Delight does not appear in the pre-eminent database of trans-Atlantic slave trade voyages.)

Year	Master	Owner	Trade	Source
1800	G.Smyth; D.Cotther	S.Teast	Bristol–Africa	LR; lengthened & good repair 1798
1802	W.Nettles; W.Woodburn	Captain & Co. Kewley & Co.	London–Cork; Liverpool–St Michaels	LR; lengthened & good repair 1798
1804	Woodburn; J.Ellis	Kewely & Co. Capt. & Co.	Liverpool–St Michaels; Dublin–Chester	LR; lengthened & good repair 1798
1810	J.Ellis	G.Blundell	Liverpool–Wexford	LR; lengthened & good repair 1798
1815	R.Roberts; J.Gibbons	G.Blundell	Liverpool–Dublin	LR; lengthened 1798 & good repair 1811

In late April or early May 1815, Captain Roberts ran Cam's Delight ashore at Seacombe, Cheshire because she was very leaky. She was on a voyage from Dublin to Liverpool.

Year	Master	Owner	Trade	Source
1820	R.Roberts	Jones & Co.	Liverpool–Dublin	LR; lengthened 1798 & good repair 1811
1825	R.Roberts	Roberts & Co.	Liverpool–Dublin	LR; lengthened 1798 & good repair 1811
1830	A.Lawson	Capt.&Co.	Liverpool coaster	LR; lengthened 1798, good repair 1811, large repair 1828, & small repair 1829
1835	H.Watson	A.Matier	Newry–Wickham	LR; homeport Newry
1837	H.Watson; E.Brown	A.Matier	Newry–Wickham; Liverpool–Chester	LR; homeport Newry

== Loss ==
A report from Liverpool dated 21 March 1838 stated that Cam's Delight had collided at Liverpool on 20 March with Mary Somerville, bound for Calcutta, and been sunk. However, her crew had been saved.
