= Mary Somerville (1834 ship) =

UK merchant ship (1835–1852)

History

United Kingdom
- Name: Mary Somerville
- Namesake: Mary Somerville
- Builder: Steele & Co., Queen's Dock, Liverpool
- Launched: 31 December 1834
- Fate: Foundered late 1852 or early 1853

General characteristics
- Tons burthen: 407 (bm)

Mary Somerville was launched in 1834 at Liverpool. She spent her career as an East Indiaman, sailing primarily for Taylor, Potter & Co., of Liverpool, for whom she was built.

- Mary Somerville was beached on 18 October 1837 at Kingstown, County Dublin. She was on a voyage from Liverpool, Lancashire to Calcutta. She was refloated on 30 November and taken into Dublin.
- A report from Liverpool dated 21 March 1838 stated that Mary Somerville, bound for Calcutta, had collided on 20 March at Liverpool with the 97-year old Cam's Delight, sinking her. However, her crew was saved.

Loss: In October 1852 Mary Somerville departed from Saint Helena for Liverpool. She was presumed subsequently to have foundered with the loss of all hands. A chest from the ship washed up at Saint Michael's Mount, Cornwall on 11 January 1853.
