= Formal science =

Study of abstract structures described by formal systems

Formal science is a branch of science studying disciplines concerned with abstract structures described by formal systems.

Whereas the natural sciences and social sciences seek to characterize physical systems and social systems, respectively, using theoretical and empirical methods, the formal sciences use language tools concerned with characterizing abstract structures described by formal systems and the deductions that can be made from them.

The formal sciences aid the natural and social sciences by providing information about the structures used to describe the physical world, and what inferences may be made about them.

== Branches ==
1. Logic (also a branch of philosophy)
2. Mathematics
3. Statistics
4. Theoretical computer science
5. Artificial intelligence
6. Systems theory
7. Theoretical linguistics
8. Decision theory
9. Systems science
10. Data science
11. Information theory
12. Computer science
13. Cryptography

== Differences from other sciences ==
One reason why mathematics enjoys special esteem, above all other sciences, is that its laws are absolutely certain and indisputable, while those of other sciences are to some extent debatable and in constant danger of being overthrown by newly discovered facts.

— Albert Einstein

Because of their non-empirical nature, formal sciences are construed by outlining a set of axioms and definitions from which other statements (theorems) are deduced. For this reason, in Rudolf Carnap's logical-positivist conception of the epistemology of science, theories belonging to formal sciences are understood to contain no synthetic statements, instead containing only analytic statements.

== See also ==
- Philosophy – Study of general and fundamental questions
  - Abstract and concrete – Metaphysics concept covering the divide between two types of entities
  - Analytic–synthetic distinction – Semantic distinction in philosophy
  - Rationalism – Epistemological view centered on reason
- Science – Systematic endeavour to gain knowledge
  - Cognitive science – Interdisciplinary scientific study of cognitive processes
  - Mathematical sciences – Group of areas of study that are primarily mathematical
- Abstract structure – Type of abstraction in science, mathematics, and philosophy
- Abstraction in mathematics – Process of extracting the underlying essence of a mathematical concept
- Abstraction in computer science – Software that provides access that hides details
- Formalism (philosophy of mathematics) – View that mathematics does not necessarily represent reality, but is more akin to a game
- Formal language – Sequence of words formed by specific rules
  - Formal grammar – Structure of a formal language
- Formal methods – Mathematical program specifications
- Formal system – Mathematical model for deduction or proof systems
- Form and content – Distinct aspects of a work of art
- Mathematical model – Description of a system using mathematical concepts and language
- Mathematics Subject Classification – Classification scheme for mathematics
- Semiotics – Study of signs
- Theory of forms – Philosophical theory attributed to Plato
