= On the Connexion of the Physical Sciences =

Book by Mary Somerville, written in 1834

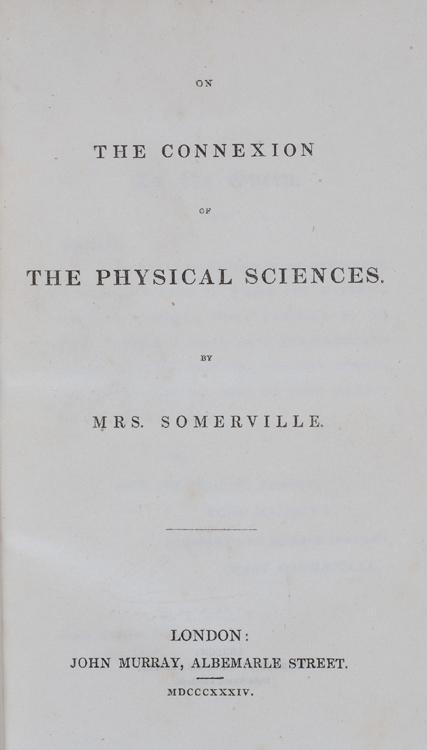
- Title page, 1834
- Author: Mary Somerville
- Language: English
- Subject: Science
- Genre: Popular science
- Publisher: John Murray
- Publication place: United Kingdom
- Media type: Print

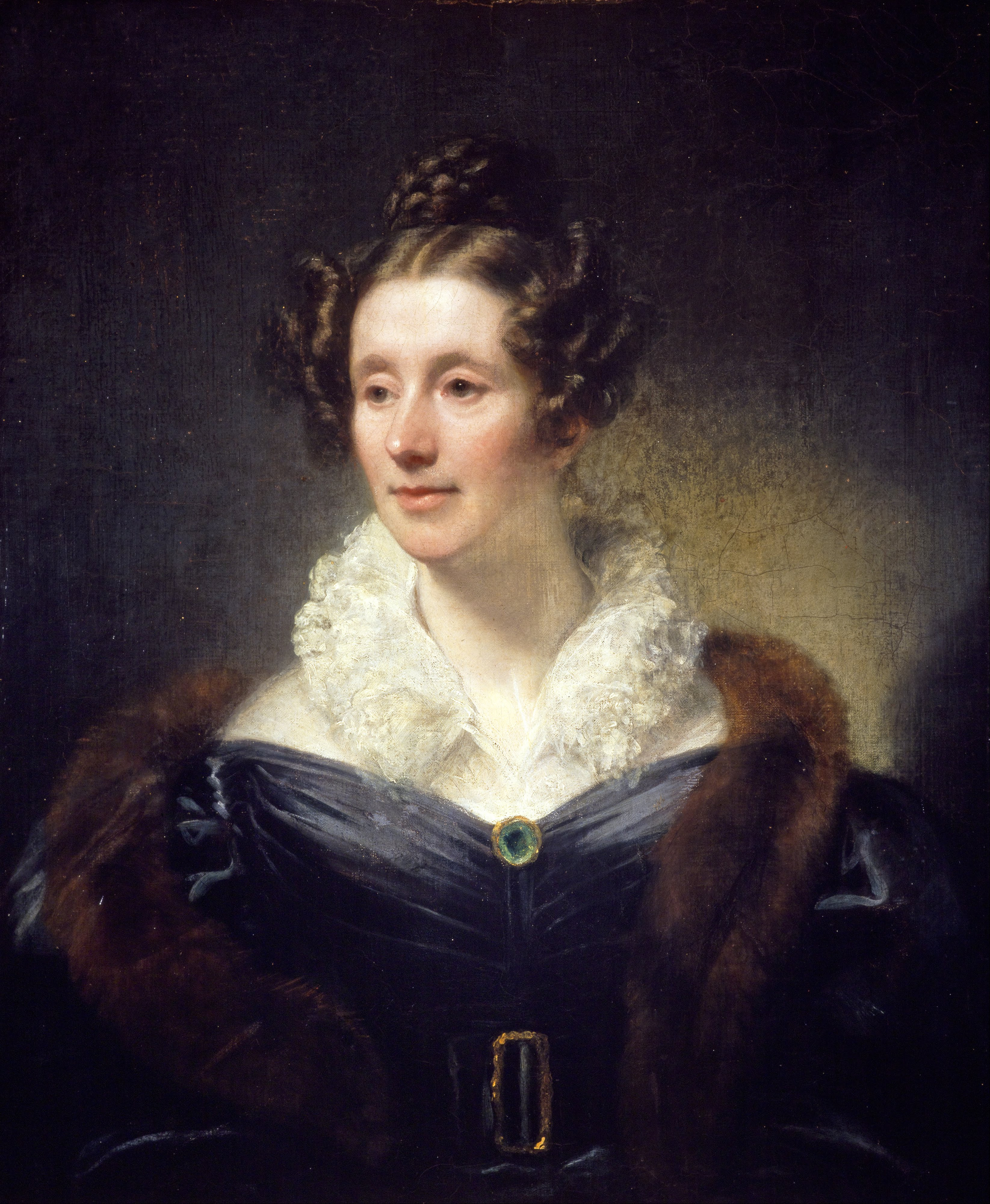
Mary Fairfax (Mrs William Somerville)

On the Connexion of the Physical Sciences, by Mary Somerville, is one of the best-selling science books of the 19th century. The book went through many editions and was translated into several European languages. It is considered one of the first popular science books, containing few diagrams and very little mathematics. It describes astronomy, physics, chemistry, geography, meteorology and electromagnetism as they were scientifically understood at the time. In an anonymous review of the book in the March 1834 issue of The Quarterly Review, later attributed to William Whewell, the term "scientist" appeared in print as a proposed collective name for investigators of the material world.

== Review and the term "scientist" ==
In the review, the reviewer wrote:

A curious illustration of this result may be observed in the want of any name by which we can designate the students of the knowledge of the material world collectively. We are informed that this difficulty was felt very oppressively by the members of the British Association for the Advancement of Science, at their meetings at York, Oxford, and Cambridge, in the last three summers. There was no general term by which these gentlemen could describe themselves with reference to their pursuits. Philosophers was felt to be too wide and too lofty a term, and was very properly forbidden them by Mr. Coleridge, both in his capacity of philologer and metaphysician; savans was rather assuming, besides being French instead of English; some ingenious gentleman proposed that, by analogy with artist, they might form scientist, and added that there could be no scruple in making free with this termination when we have such words as sciolist, economist, and atheist—but this was not generally palatable; others attempted to translate the term by which the members of similar associations in Germany have described themselves, but it was not found easy to discover an English equivalent for natur-forscher. The process of examination which it implies might suggest such undignified compounds as nature-poker, or nature-peeper, for these naturae curiosi; but these were indignantly rejected.

Ross identified the "ingenious gentleman" as Whewell himself.

== See also ==
- Letters to a German Princess
