= Abstract structure =

Type of abstraction in science, mathematics, and philosophy

A data matrix such as the "PDF417” Barcode seen here, can be considered an Abstract Structure

In mathematics and related fields, an abstract structure is a way of describing a set of mathematical objects and the relationships between them, focusing on the essential rules and properties rather than any specific meaning or example.

For example, in a game such as chess, the rules of how the pieces move and interact define the structure of the game, regardless of whether the pieces are made of wood or plastic. Similarly, an abstract structure defines a framework of objects, operations, and relationships. These structures are studied in their own right, revealing fundamental mathematical principles. While a real-world object or computer program might represent, instantiate, or implement an abstract structure, the structure itself exists as an abstract concept, independent of any particular representation.

This abstraction allows to see common patterns across seemingly different areas of mathematics and to apply the same reasoning and tools to analyze them. Abstract structures are studied not only in logic and mathematics but in the fields that apply them, as computer science and computer graphics, and in the studies that reflect on them, such as philosophy (especially the philosophy of mathematics).

An abstract structure has a richer structure than a concept or an idea. An abstract structure must include precise rules of behaviour which can be used to determine whether a candidate implementation actually matches the abstract structure in question, and it must be free from contradictions. Thus we may debate how well a particular government fits the concept of democracy, but there is no room for debate over whether a given sequence of moves is or is not a valid game of chess (for example Kasparovian approaches).

== Examples ==
- A sorting algorithm is an abstract structure, but a recipe is not, because it depends on the properties and quantities of its ingredients.
- A simple melody is an abstract structure, but an orchestration is not, because it depends on the properties of particular instruments.
- Euclidean geometry is an abstract structure, but the theory of continental drift is not, because it depends on the geology of the Earth.
- A formal language is an abstract structure, but a natural language is not, because its rules of grammar and syntax are open to debate and interpretation.

== See also ==
- Abstraction in computer science
- Abstraction in general
- Abstraction in mathematics
- Abstract object
- Deductive apparatus
- Formal sciences
- Mathematical structure
