= Mary Somerville =

Scottish scientist (1780–1872)

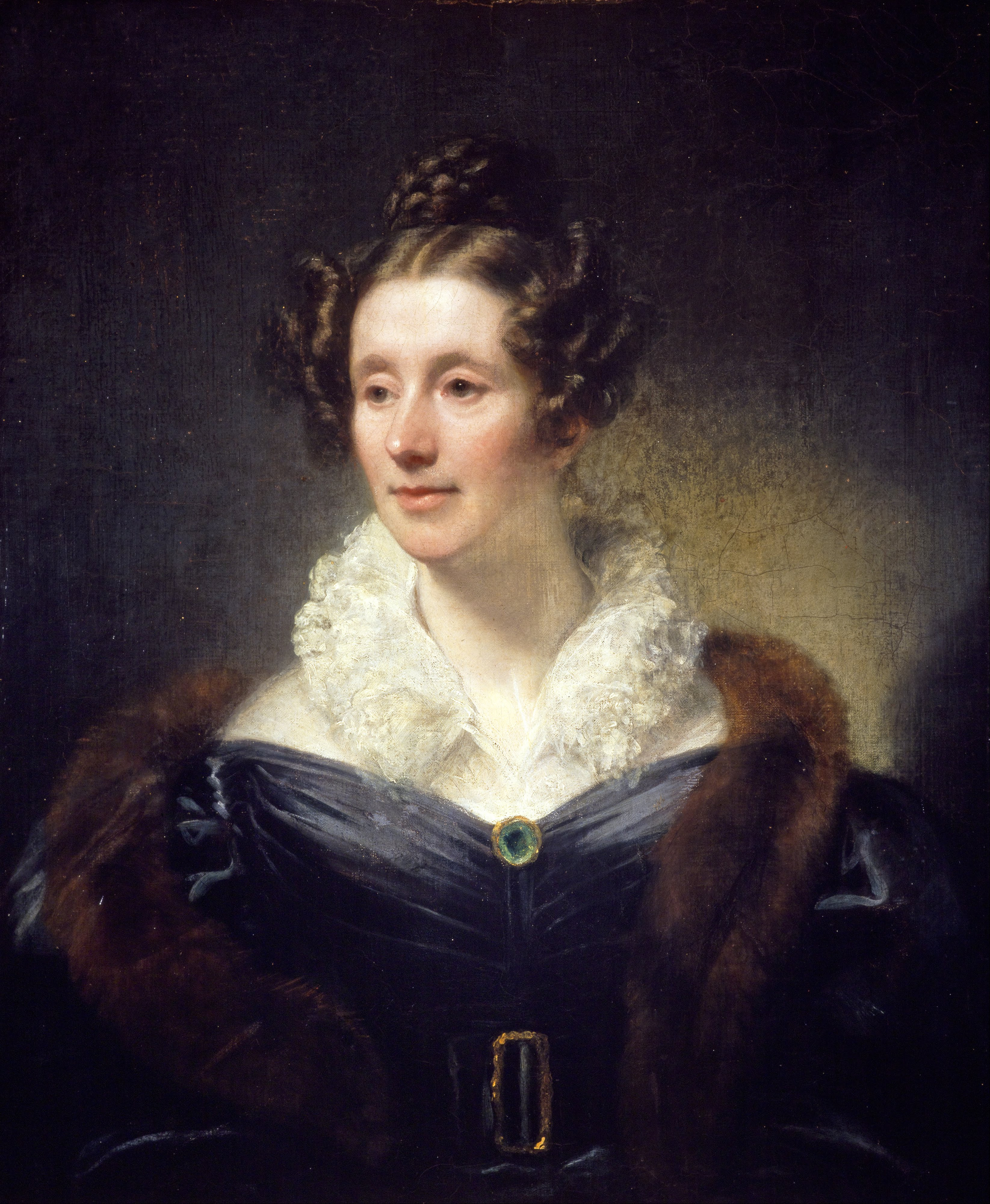
- Portrait of Mary Somerville by Thomas Phillips, 1834
- Born: Mary Fairfax; 26 December 1780; Jedburgh, Scotland
- Died: 29 November 1872 (aged 91); Naples, Kingdom of Italy
- Resting place: English Cemetery, Naples
- Awards: Patron's Medal (1869)
- Scientific career
- Fields: Science writing; Mathematics

Mary Somerville (née Fairfax, formerly Greig; 1780–1872) was a Scottish scientist, writer, and polymath. She studied mathematics and astronomy, and in 1835 she and Caroline Herschel were elected as the first female Honorary Members of the Royal Astronomical Society.

In John Stuart Mill's 1866 mass petition to the UK Parliament to grant women the right to vote, the first signature on the petition was Somerville's, which she signed before the age of 86.

When she died in 1872, The Morning Post declared in her obituary that "Whatever difficulty we might experience in the middle of the nineteenth century in choosing a king of science, there could be no question whatever as to the queen of science". The first use of the word "scientist" in the English language was in a review by William Whewell of Somerville's second book On the Connexion of the Physical Sciences. Beyond her work as a scientist, she is known and celebrated as a mathematician and philosopher.

Somerville College, a college of the University of Oxford, is named after her, reflecting the virtues of liberalism and academic success that the college wished to embody. She is featured on the front of the Royal Bank of Scotland polymer £10 note launched in 2017 along with a quotation from On the Connexion of the Physical Sciences.

== Early life and education ==
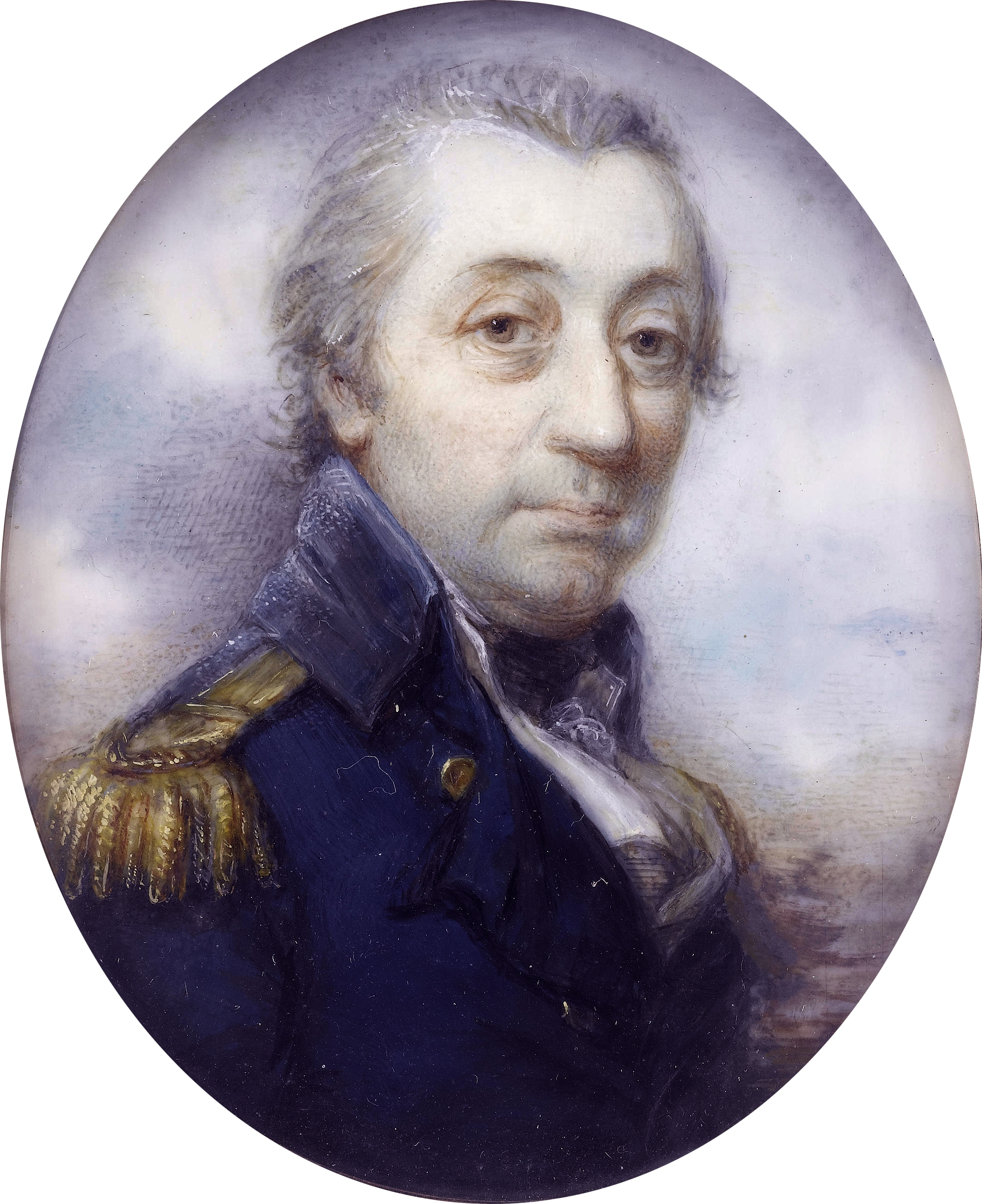
Vice-Admiral William Fairfax; Mary's father, painted in 1798

Somerville, the daughter of Vice-Admiral Sir William George Fairfax, was related to several prominent Scottish houses through her mother, Margaret Charters. She was born on 26 December 1780 at the manse of Jedburgh, the home of her maternal aunt and the Rev. Dr. Thomas Somerville (1741–1830) (author of My Own Life and Times). Her childhood home was at Burntisland, Fife, where her mother was from.

Somerville was the second of four surviving children (three of her siblings had died in infancy). She was particularly close to her oldest brother Sam. The family lived in genteel poverty as her father's naval pay remained meagre, despite his rise through the ranks. Her mother supplemented the household's income by growing vegetables, maintaining an orchard and keeping cows for milk. Her mother taught her to read the Bible and Calvinist catechisms. When her household chores were done, Mary was free to roam among the birds and flowers in the garden.

In her autobiography, Somerville recollects that on her father's return from sea he said to his wife, "This kind of life will never do, Mary must at least know how to write and keep accounts". Ten-year-old Mary was then sent to an expensive boarding school in Musselburgh, where she learned the first principles of writing, rudimentary French and English grammar. Upon returning home, she:

...was no longer amused in the gardens, but wandered about the country. When the tide was out I spent hours on the sands, looking at the star-fish and sea-urchins, or watching the children digging for sand-eels, cockles, and the spouting razor-fish. I made collections of shells, such as were cast ashore, some so small that they appeared like white specks in patches of black sand. There was a small pier on the sands for shipping limestone brought from the coal mines inland. I was astonished to see the surface of these blocks of stone covered with beautiful impressions of what seemed to be leaves; how they got there I could not imagine, but I picked up the broken bits, and even large pieces, and brought them to my repository.

During bad weather, Somerville occupied herself with reading the books in her father's library, including Shakespeare, as well as with "domestic duties." Such duties "occupied a great part of my time; besides, I had to shew my sampler, working the alphabet from A to Z, as well as the ten numbers, on canvas". Her aunt Janet came to live with the family and reportedly said to her mother "I wonder you let Mary waste her time in reading, she never shews [sews] more than if she were a man." Somerville was then sent to the village school to learn plain needlework, where she found herself annoyed that her "turn for reading was so much disapproved of, and thought it unjust that women should have been given a desire for knowledge if it were wrong to acquire it." The village school master came several time each week to teach Mary at home. In her Personal Recollections, Somerville notes that the boys learned Latin at the village school, while "it was thought sufficient for the girls to be able to read the Bible; very few even learnt writing."

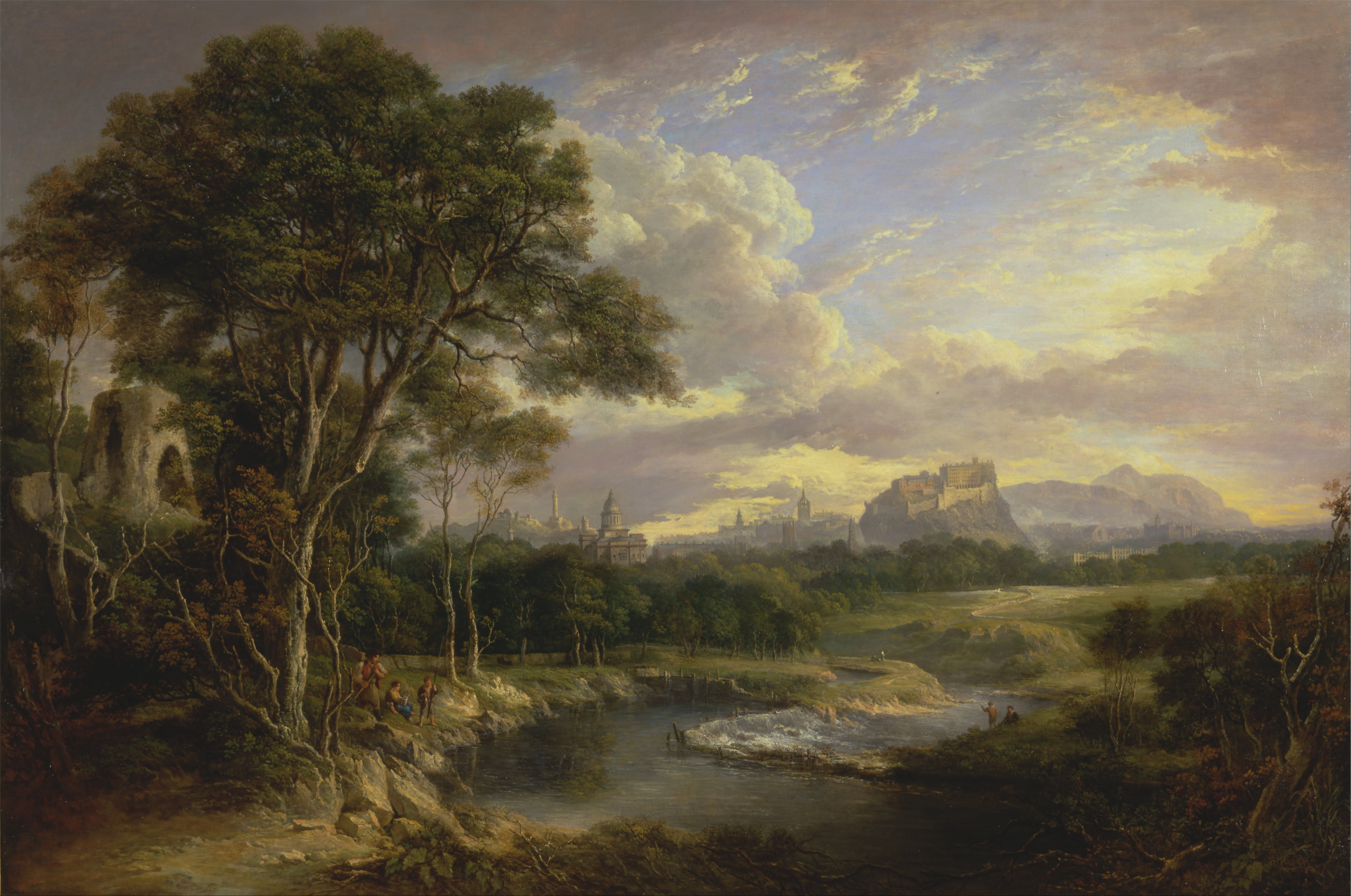
View of the City of Edinburgh by Alexander Nasmyth. Mary spent the winters in Edinburgh and attended Nasmyth's academy.

When she was 13, her mother sent her to writing school in Edinburgh, where she improved her writing skills and studied arithmetic. Back in Burntisland she taught herself sufficient Latin to read the books in the home library. While visiting her aunt in Jedburgh, she met her uncle, Dr. Thomas Somerville. She gathered her courage to tell him that she had been learning Latin. Dr. Somerville assured her that in earlier times many women had become elegant scholars. He then proceeded to enable her to improve her Latin by reading Virgil with her. While staying with another uncle, William Charters, in Edinburgh, Somerville was sent to a dancing school, where she learned manners and how to curtsey. She also accompanied her uncle and aunt on their visits to the Lyell family in Kinnordy; Charles Lyell later became a celebrated geologist and Somerville's friend.

Somerville's father was a Tory, but she was a Liberal, made so by the "unjust and exaggerated abuse of the Liberal party. From my earliest years my mind revolved against oppression and tyranny, and I resented the injustice of the world in denying all those privileges of education to my sex which were so lavishly bestowed on men." At the time, slaves still worked to harvest sugar in the West Indies and in protest Somerville and her oldest brother Sam would refuse to take sugar in their tea.

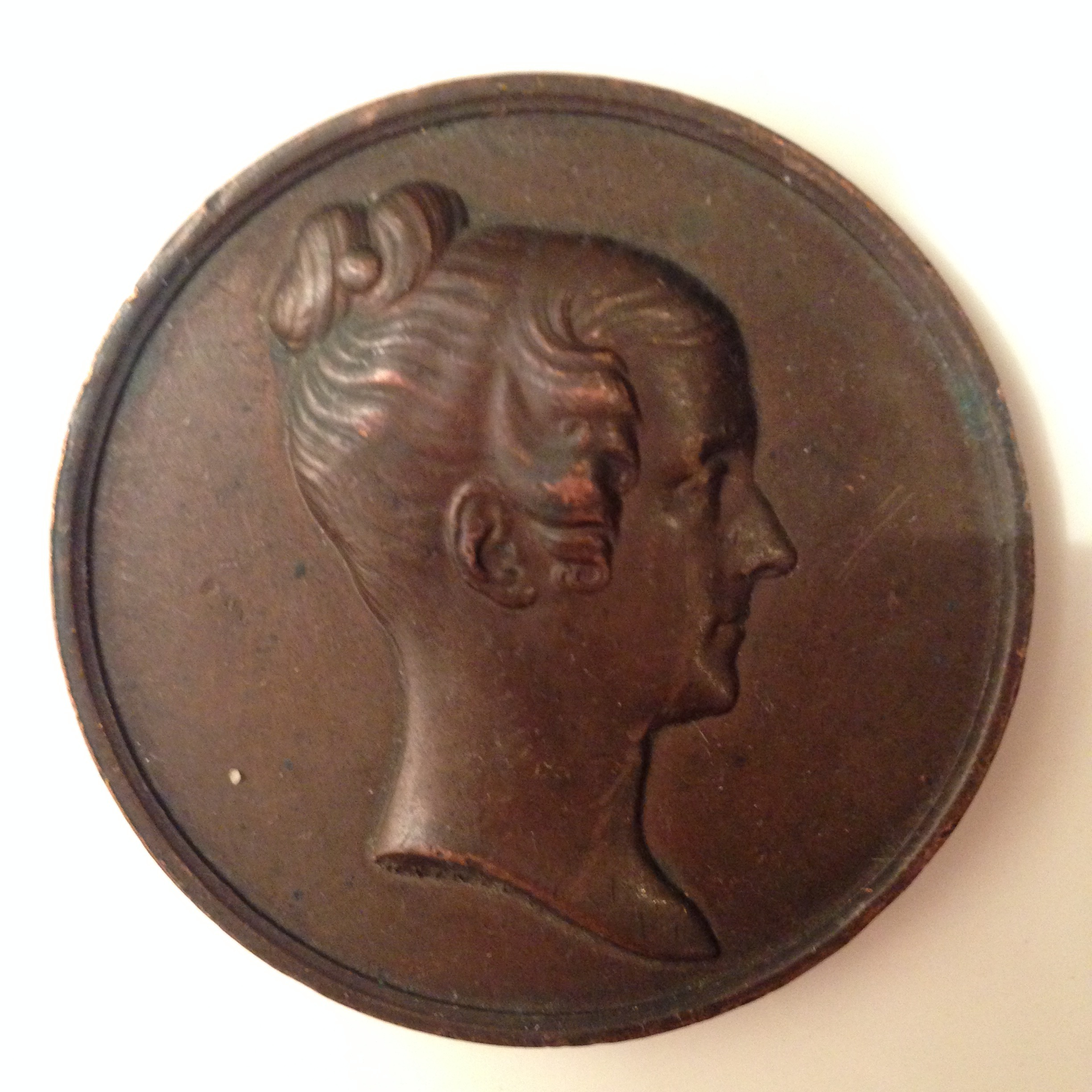
Commemorative medal of Mary Somerville

At Burntisland, where she stayed the summer with her uncle and aunt, Somerville had access to elementary books on algebra and geometry. She spent the summer learning to play the piano. In addition to the piano, she learned Greek so she could read Xenophon and Herodotus in their original versions. On her return to Edinburgh she was allowed to attend the academy of painter Alexander Nasmyth, which had opened for ladies. When Nasmyth advised another student to study Euclid's Elements to gain a foundation in perspective, astronomy and mechanical science, Somerville spotted an opportunity. She thought the book would help her understand Navigations by John Robertson.

She continued in the traditional role of a daughter in a well-connected family, attending social events and maintaining a sweet and polite manner, which led to her nickname as "the Rose of Jedburgh" among Edinburgh socialites. Meanwhile, a young tutor came to stay with the family in Burntisland to educate her younger brother Henry. The tutor, Mr. Craw, was a Greek and Latin scholar, and Somerville asked him to purchase elementary books on algebra and geometry for her. He presented Somerville with Euclid's Elements and Algebra by John Bonnycastle. Somerville would rise early to play the piano, painted during the day, and stayed up late to study Euclid and algebra. When Lord Balmuto, a family friend, invited her to visit his family, Somerville saw her first laboratory. She also spent some time with the Oswalds family in Dunnikeir, whose daughter, a bold horsewoman who impressed Somerville, became a Greek and Latin scholar and married Thomas Bruce, 7th Earl of Elgin.

Winters were usually spent in Edinburgh. In the winter of 1796, Somerville made her first appearance at a ball under the care of Lady Buchan. Her first dancing partner was the Earl of Minto.

In the autumn of 1797, her father was caught up in a mutiny while serving as flag-captain under Admiral Duncan on HMS Venerable. Despite the mutiny, the Battle of Camperdown was won by the British. Her father was knighted and made Colonel of Marines. Her eldest brother died at the age of 21 in Calcutta while serving in the East India Company's military service. The family had hoped he would make a sufficient fortune in a few years to enable him to return home.

== Marriage and studies ==
In 1804, Somerville met her first husband, Lieutenant Samuel Greig. Her distant cousin, a son of Admiral Samuel Greig, he was commissioner of the Russian navy and Russian consul for Britain. They married and had two children, one of whom, Woronzow Greig, would become a barrister and scientist. They lived in London, but it was not a happy time for Somerville. Her husband did not think much of women's intellectual capacity. Indeed, Greig "possessed in full the prejudice against learned women which was common at that time." Instead, Somerville took lessons in French, which was considered more appropriate. When her husband died in 1807 she was still nursing their youngest child and she returned to Scotland.

Her inheritance from Greig gave her the freedom to pursue intellectual interests. By that time, she had studied plane and spherical trigonometry, conic sections and James Ferguson's Astronomy. Somerville also read Isaac Newton's Principia. John Playfair, professor of natural philosophy at University of Edinburgh, encouraged her studies and through him she began a correspondence with William Wallace, with whom she discussed mathematical problems.

Somerville began solving mathematical problems posed in the mathematical journal of the Military College at Marlow and eventually made a name for herself after solving a diophantine problem, for which she was awarded a silver medal in 1811. Somerville published five solutions in Volumes 3 and 4 of the Mathematical Repository under the pseudonym 'A Lady'. Two of her solutions demonstrated her early adoption of differential calculus—her contribution to the circulation and visibility of calculus in early 19th-century Britain.

Wallace suggested that she study the writings of French mathematician Pierre-Simon Laplace, which summarised the theory of gravity and collected the mathematical results established in the 50 years since Principia had been published. Somerville said that studying Laplace's work gave her the confidence to persevere in her mathematical studies. She extended her studies to astronomy, chemistry, geography, microscopy, electricity and magnetism. At the age of 33 she bought herself a library of scientific books. These included Louis-Benjamin Francœur's Elements of Mechanics, Sylvestre François Lacroix' Algebra and Calculus Treatise, Jean-Baptiste Biot's Analytical Geometry and Astronomy, Siméon Denis Poisson's Treatise on Mechanics, Joseph-Louis Lagrange's Theory of Analytical Functions, Leonhard Euler's Elements of Algebra and Isoperimetrical Problems, Alexis Clairaut's Figure of the Earth, Gaspard Monge's Application of Analysis to Geometry, and François Callet's Logarithmus.

In her Personal Recollections, Somerville expressed the opinion that mathematical science was at a low ebb in Britain, due to a reverence for Newton that prevented scientists from adopting calculus. On the Continent astronomical and mechanical science had reached a high degree of perfection. In her opinion this deadlock was not broken until 1816, when Charles Babbage, John Herschel and George Peacock published a translation of the lectures of Sylvestre Lacroix, then a state-of-the-art calculus textbook.

While staying with her family in Scotland, Somerville became acquainted with several leading intellectual lights, such as Henry Brougham. In 1812 she married another cousin, Dr William Somerville (1771–1860), inspector of the Army Medical Board, with whom she had four children. He encouraged and aided her in the study of the physical sciences. In 1817, her husband was elected to the Royal Society and together they moved in the leading social circles of the day. Somerville was well known to scientists, as well as to leading writers and artists. Painter J. M. W. Turner knew that Somerville and her husband's family were neighbors of the writer Walter Scott. She wrote, "I shall never forget the charm of this little society, especially the supper-parties at Abbotsford, when Scott was in the highest glee, telling amusing tales, ancient legends, ghost and witch stories."

In 1819, Somerville's husband was appointed physician to Chelsea Hospital and the family moved into a government house at Hanover Square. Somerville was a friend of Anne Isabella Milbanke, Baroness Wentworth, and was mathematics tutor to her daughter, Ada Lovelace. With Somerville, Lovelace attended scientific gatherings where she met Charles Babbage. Somerville College owns a letter from Babbage to Somerville inviting her to view his 'Calculating Engine'. Somerville frequently visited Babbage while he was "making his Calculating-machines". Somerville and Lovelace maintained a close friendship and when Lovelace encountered difficulties with a mathematical calculation, she would walk to Somerville's house and discuss the matter over a cup of tea.

In 1823, the Somervilles' youngest daughter died after an illness.

While living in London the Somervilles travelled through Europe on a number of occasions, leaving their children with their German governess. Among their travel companions was the jurist and politician Sir James Mackintosh. Before leaving London the Somervilles contacted the people they wanted to meet, which included numerous celebrated intellectuals. The Somervilles also received frequent visitors; writer Maria Edgeworth would visit them when in England.

== Science practice and writing ==
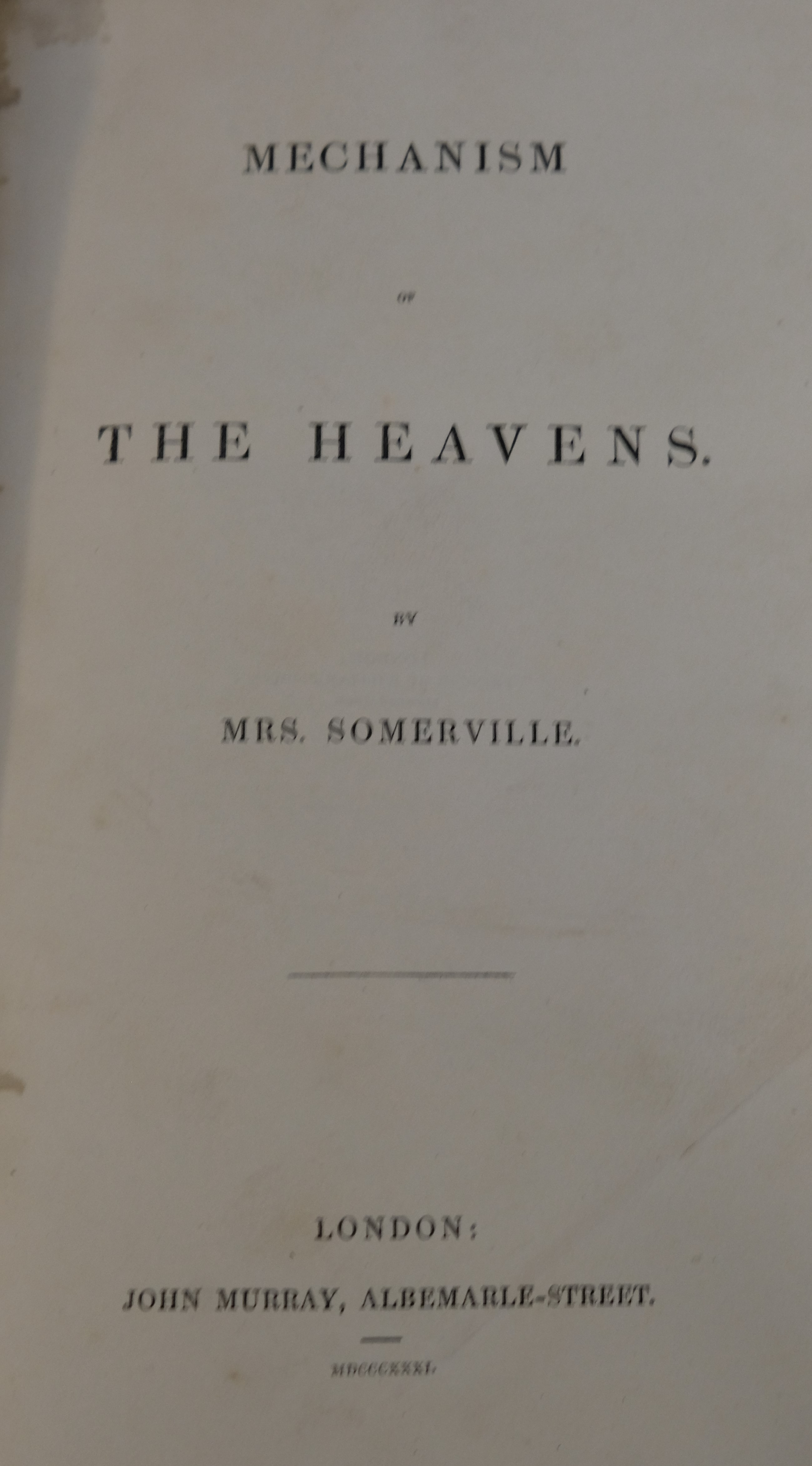
Title page to Mechanism of the Heavens (1831)

Page 157 from Mechanism of the Heavens, Somerville discusses the law of universal gravity and Kepler's laws of planetary motion.

Somerville conducted experiments to explore the relationship between light and magnetism. Her first paper, "The magnetic properties of the violet rays of the solar spectrum", was published in the Proceedings of the Royal Society in 1826. Although her conclusions were faulty, the topic was of popular interest at the time and the paper brought her to notice in scientific circles. Using a sample of silver nitrate supplied by Michael Faraday, Somerville conducted experiments on the blackening effect of sunlight, the reaction used in early experiments in photography. She later developed her technique by using an optical prism and vegetable dyes, producing an early version of the optical spectrometer. Sir David Brewster, inventor of the kaleidoscope, wrote in 1829 that Mary Somerville was "certainly the most extraordinary woman in Europe – a mathematician of the very first rank with all the gentleness of a woman".

Lord Brougham asked Somerville to translate the Mécanique Céleste of Pierre-Simon Laplace for the Society for the Diffusion of Useful Knowledge. Laplace had, in five exhaustive volumes, summed up the current state of gravitational mathematics. Mécanique Céleste was acclaimed as the greatest intellectual achievement since the Principia. Somerville produced not just a translation, but also an expanded version of the first two volumes. She wrote a standalone exposition of the mathematics behind the workings of the Solar System, of which she said "I translated Laplace's work from algebra into common language". It was published in 1831, under the title of The Mechanism of the Heavens, and it immediately made her famous. Until the 1880s Mechanism was set as a textbook for undergraduates at the University of Cambridge.

After receiving a copy of Mechanism, Joanna Baillie wrote to Somerville, "I feel myself greatly honoured by receiving such a mark of regard from one who has done more to remove the light estimation in which the capacity of women is too often held than all that has been accomplished by the whole Sisterhood of Poetical Damsels & novel-writing Authors." The book was praised by George Peacock, Professor of the University of Cambridge, thus many of the 750 copies printed were bought in Cambridge. Reviews were favourable and Somerville received letters of congratulation from "many men of science". She was elected honorary member of the Royal Irish Academy, the Bristol Philosophical Institution, and the Société de Physique et d'Histoire Naturelle de Genève in 1834. The British Crown granted her a civil pension of £200 a year in recognition of her eminence in science and literature.

Somerville was passionate about astronomy and believed it to be the most extensive example of the connection of the physical sciences in that it combined the sciences of number and quantity, of rest and motion.

In [astronomy] we perceive the operation of a force which is mixed up with everything that exists in the heavens or on earth; which pervades every atom, rules the motions of animate and inanimate beings, and is as sensible in the descent of a rain-drop as in the falls of Niagara; in the weight of the air, as in the periods of the moon.

In Somerville's time, the value of scientific publications depended on the currency of the information, therefore frequent editions had to be produced. Her subsequent books reflect the time that she could be free in her domestic life as her children became more independent. They also reflect the need to earn money, as the Somervilles suffered through a number of financial crises that peaked in 1835. She publicly and plausibly maintained that she wrote only for pleasure. Privately, she paid considerable attention to the profitability of her books. Through personal connections she could secure John Murray as the publisher of her first book, Mechanism, and he remained her publisher throughout her long career. Murray later commented that despite having made little profit he was very pleased to have had the honour of publishing the works of such an extraordinary person. Her second book, On the Connexion of the Physical Sciences, sold 15,000 copies and established her reputation in elite science.

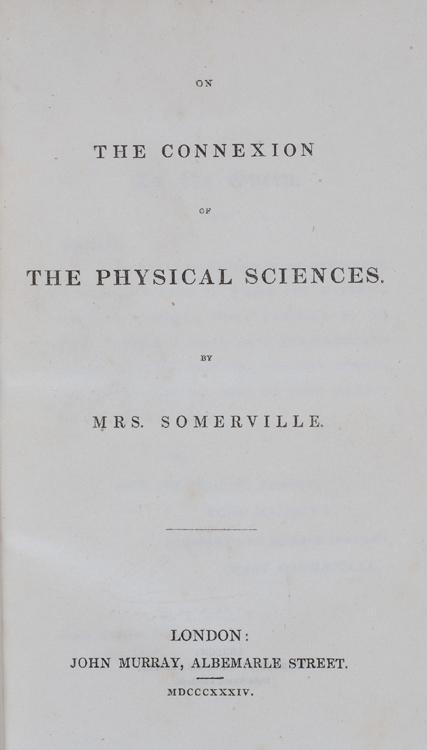
Cover page of On the Connexion of the Physical Sciences

She was among those who discussed a hypothetical planet perturbing Uranus. In the 6th edition of Connexion (1842), she wrote, "If after the lapse of years the tables formed from a combination of numerous observations should be still inadequate to represent the motions of Uranus, the discrepancies may reveal the existence, nay, even the mass and orbit of a body placed for ever beyond the sphere of vision". Predictions were fulfilled in 1846 with the discovery of Neptune revolving at a distance of 3,000,000,000 miles from the Sun. "The mass of Neptune, the size and position of his orbit in space, and his periodic time, were determined from his disturbing action on Uranus before the planet itself had been seen." Connexion ran to 10 editions, more than 9,000 copies and was its publisher's most successful science book until The Origin of Species by Charles Darwin. It was translated into German and Italian and went through various editions in the United States.

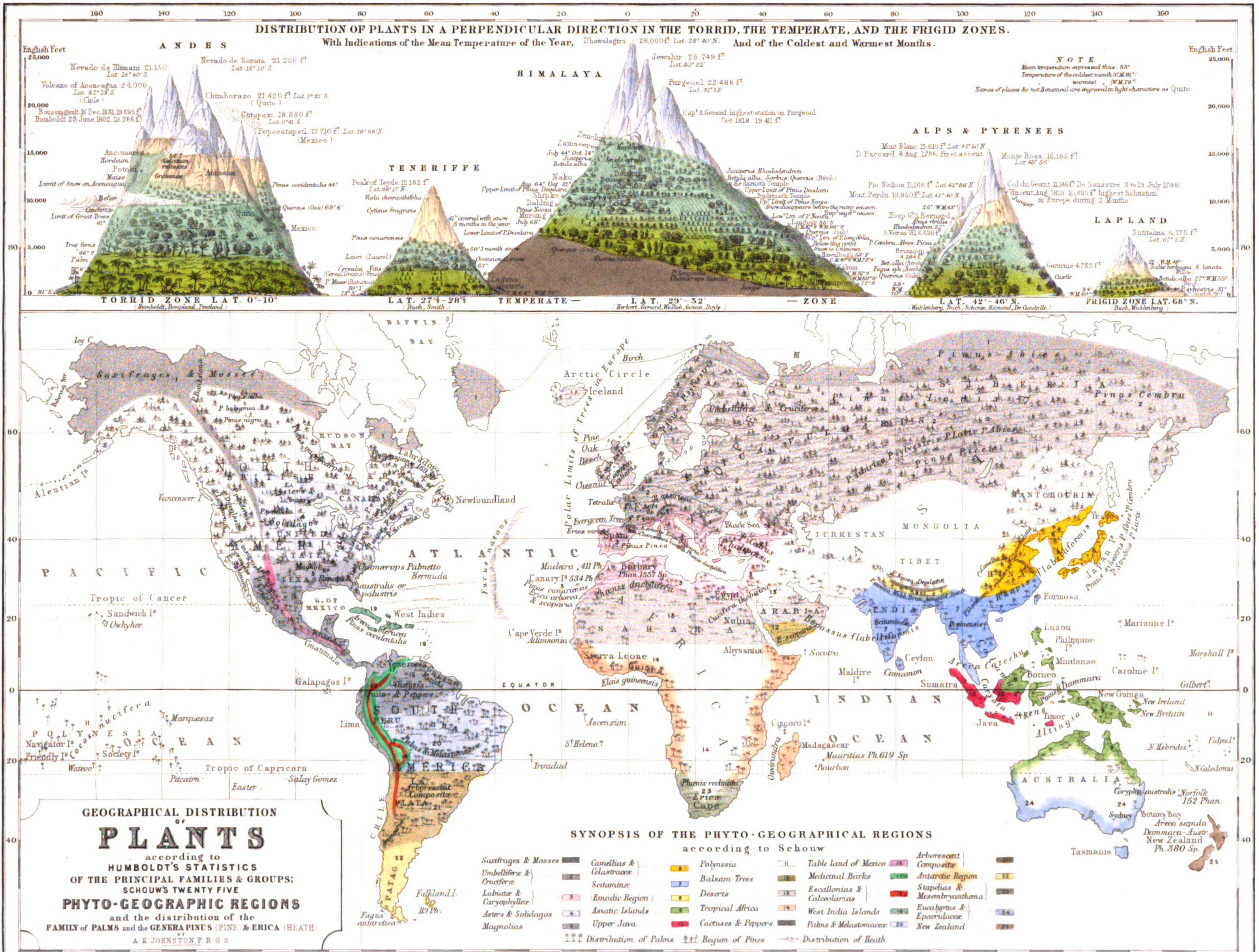
In the revised third edition of Physical Geography, published in 1851, Somerville noted that her publisher had intended to include illustrations, but that this plan was abandoned since the Physical Atlas provided maps illustrating the "most important questions" of physical geography. Geographical Distribution of Plants from Alexander Keith Johnston's 1848 The Physical Atlas.

Her book Physical Geography was published in 1848 and was the first English textbook on the subject. It remained in use until the early 20th century. Physical Geography was financially successful and brought her the Victoria Gold Medal of the Royal Geographical Society. Somerville followed, as she said, "the noble example of Baron Humboldt, the patriarch of physical geography", and she took an extended view of geography that included the Earth, its animal, "vegetable inhabitants", as well as "the past and present condition of man, the origin, manners, and languages of existing nations, and the monuments of those that have been".

One of the 180 illustrations in the book Molecular and Microscopic Science, published 1869. This is an illustration of a Haliomma echinaster, a bioluminescent radiolarian.

Physical Geography starts with describing the overall structure of planet Earth, along with a brief allusion to the location of the Earth within the Solar System. Subsequently, the book focuses on terrestrial topics, such as the most basic features of land and water, and formations such as mountains, volcanoes, oceans, rivers and lakes. Somerville goes on to discuss the elements that govern temperature, such as light, electricity, storms, the aurora and magnetism. Eventually the book turns to vegetation, birds and mammals, and their geographical distribution in the Arctic, Europe, Asia, Africa, America and the Antarctic. Somerville ends the book with a discussion of "the distribution, condition, and future prospects of the human race". She emphasises the reciprocal dependencies in physical geography and the relationship between human beings and nature. In line with Victorian thinking, Somerville asserts the superiority of human beings, but maintains the interdependencies and interconnectedness of creation. Physical Geography sold more copies than any of her other books and earned Humboldt's admiration. After receiving a copy of the book he wrote to her: "You alone could provide your literature with an original cosmological work".

Her fourth book, Molecular and Microscopic Science, took 10 years to write, finally published in 1869. She soon had doubts about devoting herself to popularising science, instead of concentrating on mathematics alone. Of the book she said: "In writing this book I made a great mistake, and repent it - Mathematics are the natural bent of my mind. If I had devoted myself exclusively to that study, I might probably have written something useful, as a new era had begun in that science." Regardless, the book was another success. It gave an up-to-date description of the latest discoveries revealed through the microscope and was published in two volumes and three parts. In the first part Somerville explained the latest thinking on atoms and molecules, the second covered plant life, while the third explored animal life. The book included 180 illustrations, which caused her publisher great expense.

Although Mary Somerville did not exhibit work at the Great Exhibition of 1851, her scientific writings were widely read during the period and contributed to the Victorian public’s growing engagement with astronomy, physics, and the physical sciences. Historians of Victorian science note that the Exhibition’s emphasis on scientific instruments, education, and the popularisation of scientific knowledge reflected themes central to Somerville’s work, particularly her books On the Connexion of the Physical Sciences (1834) and Physical Geography (1848).

She was elected to the American Geographical and Statistical Society in 1857 and the Italian Geographical Society in 1870, and was made a member of the American Philosophical Society.

== Death ==
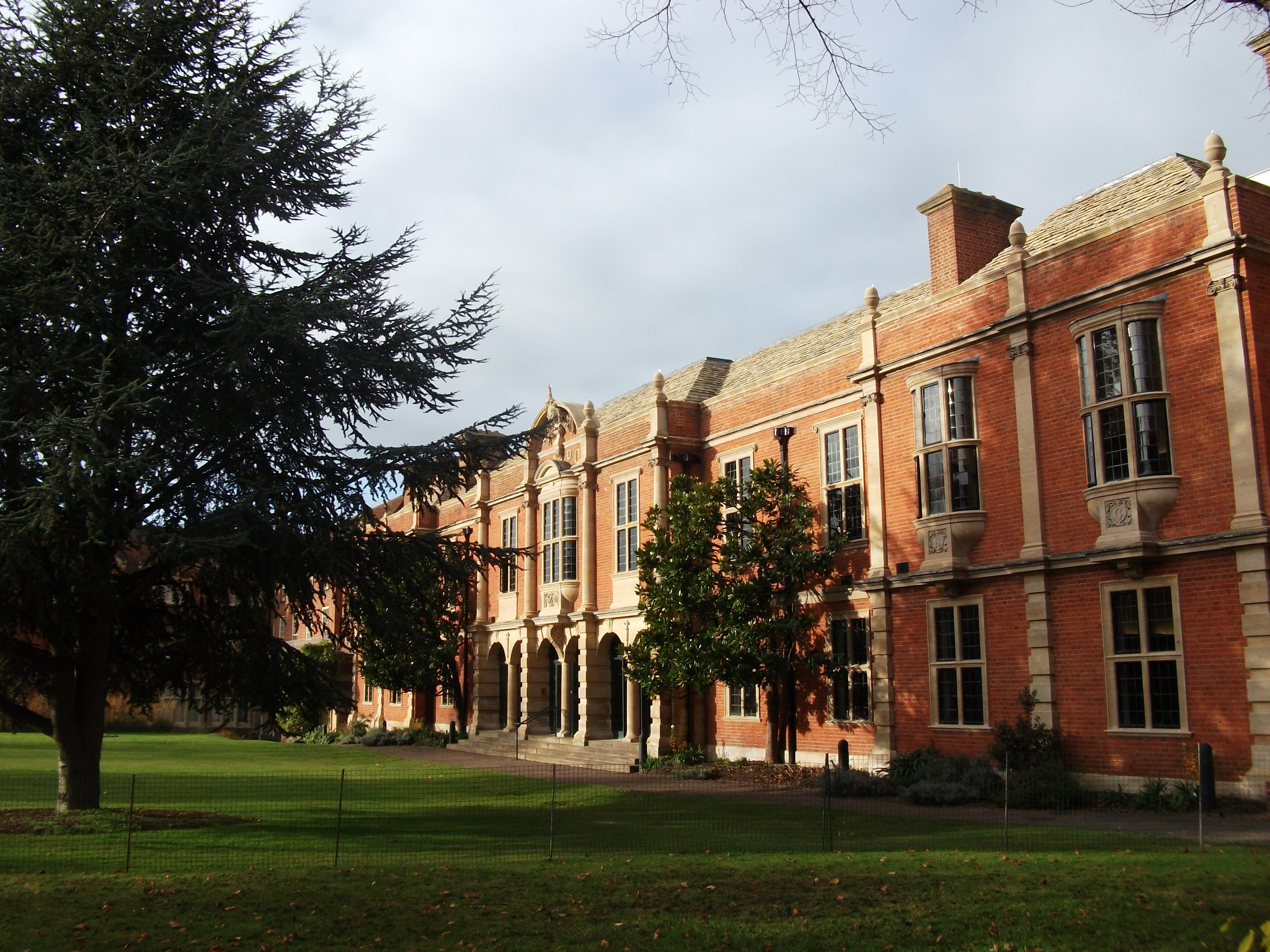
Somerville College Library, Oxford

From 1833 onwards, Somerville and her husband spent most of their time in Italy. Somerville maintained correspondence with a large number of leading scientists and remained engaged in current debates on facts and theories.

In 1868, four years before her death a month before her 92nd birthday, she was the first person to sign John Stuart Mill's unsuccessful petition for female suffrage. In her autobiography, Somerville wrote that "British laws are adverse to women". She detailed the obstacles she had faced in obtaining an education as a young girl, though she did not speculate on the nature of the problem. During her lifetime, agitation had grown for women's access to higher education. In 1875, astronomer Maria Mitchell was told by a college president that he "would hire a woman scientist if she was as good as Mary Somerville".

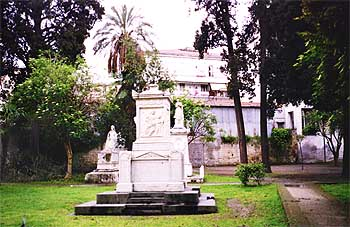
The English Cemetery, Naples. Statue of Mary Somerville is in the background.

Somerville died at Naples on 29 November 1872, and was buried there in the English Cemetery.

== Legacy ==
In the year following Somerville's death, her autobiographical Personal Recollections was published, consisting of reminiscences written during her old age. Over 10,000 pages are in the Somerville Collection of the Bodleian Library and Somerville College, Oxford. The collection includes papers relating to her writing and published work, and correspondence with family members, scientists and writers, as well as other figures in public life. Also included is substantial correspondence with the Byron and Lovelace families.

Her shell collection was given to Somerville College, Oxford by her descendants.

Somerville Square in Burntisland is named after her family and marks the site of their home.

Somerville College, Oxford, was named after Somerville, as are Somerville House, Burntisland, where she lived for a time, and Somerville House, a high school for girls in Brisbane, Australia. One of the Committee Rooms of the Scottish Parliament in Edinburgh has been named after her.

Somerville Island (74°44′N 96°10′W), a small island in Barrow Strait, Nunavut, was named after her by Sir William Edward Parry in 1819.

The Somerville Club was founded in 1878 in London, by 1887 it was re-established as the New Somerville Club, and it disappeared by 1908.

The vessel Mary Somerville was launched in 1835 at Liverpool. She traded with India for Taylor, Potter & Co., of Liverpool, and disappeared with the loss of all aboard in late 1852 or early 1853.

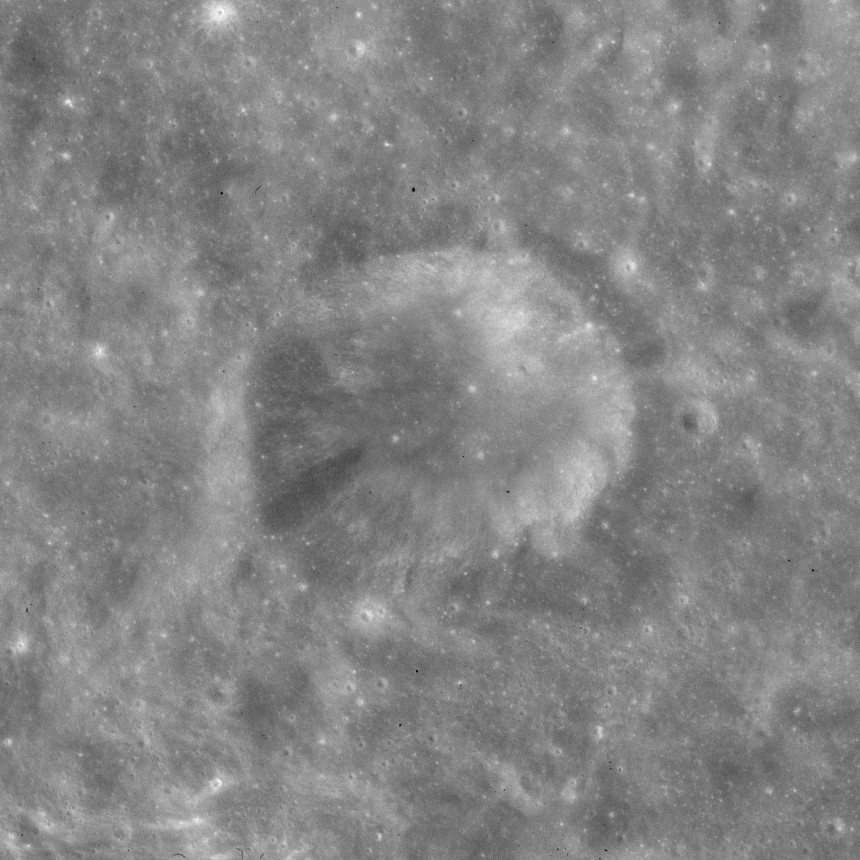
Somerville Crater

Mary Somerville is featured in miniature in The English Bijou Almanack, 1837, with poetry by Letitia Elizabeth Landon.

5771 Somerville (1987 ST1) is a main-belt asteroid discovered on 21 September 1987 by E. Bowell at Lowell Observatory in Flagstaff, Arizona, and named after her. Somerville crater is a small lunar crater in the eastern part of the Moon. It lies to the east of the prominent crater Langrenus. It is one of a handful of lunar craters named after women.

In February 2016 Somerville was shortlisted, along with Scottish physicist James Clerk Maxwell and civil engineer Thomas Telford, in a public competition run by the Royal Bank of Scotland to decide whose face should appear on the bank's new £10 notes, to be issued in 2017. Later that month RBS announced that she had won the public vote, held on Facebook. The banknotes, bearing her image, were issued in the second half of 2017.

To celebrate International Women's Day in 2000, female students at the University of Glasgow changed the signage of the Joseph Black building to the Mary Fairfax Somerville Building.

On 2 February 2020, Google celebrated her with a Google Doodle.

On 1 April 2022, a satellite named after Somerville (ÑuSat 26, COSPAR 2022–033) was launched into space as part of the Satellogic Aleph-1 satellite constellation.

Poet Jessy Randall's 2022 collection Mathematics for Ladies includes a poem honoring Somerville.

== Children ==
From her first marriage she had a son, Woronzow Greig (1805–1865), named after Count Semyon Vorontsov, the Russian ambassador in London who had appointed Samuel Greig as his Consul General. Woronzow married Agnes Graham but all their children died at birth or in infancy.

From her second marriage she had three daughters and one son: Margaret Farquhar Somerville (1813–1823; died in childhood), Thomas Somerville (1814–1815; died in infancy), Martha Charters Somerville (1815–1879) and Mary Charlotte Somerville (1817–1875). Her two surviving daughters spent most of their lives caring for Mary.

== Bibliography ==
- 1826 "On the magnetizing power of the more refrangible solar rays"
- 1831 Mechanism of the Heavens
- 1832 "A Preliminary Dissertation on the Mechanisms of the Heavens"
- 1834 On the Connection of the Physical Sciences
- 1848 Physical Geography
- 1869 Molecular and Microscopic Science
- 1874 Personal recollections, from early life to old age, of Mary Somerville

== See also ==
- People on Scottish banknotes
- Timeline of women in science
- Mary Somerville (1834 ship) – ship launched at Liverpool in 1835 and named for Mary Somerville
- Institute_of_Physics_Awards#Outreach_awards The Mary Somerville Medal and Prize
