= Tatannuaq =

Inuk interpreter (c. 1795 – early 1834)

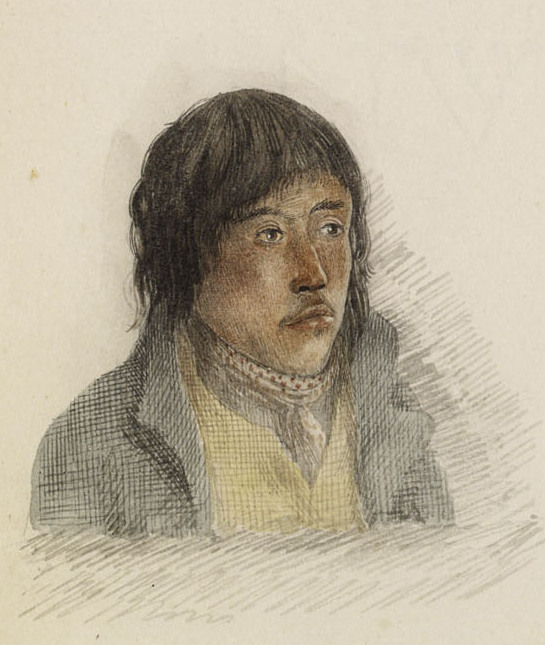
- Sketch of Tatannuaq in 1821
- Born: c. 1790s ~320 kilometres (200 mi) north of Churchill, Rupert's Land, British North America
- Died: February or early March 1834 near Fort Resolution, North-Western Territory, British North America
- Other name: Augustus
- Children: 3

Tatannuaq (Inuktitut: ᑕᑕᓐᓄᐊᖅ, Inuktitut pronunciation: [tatanːuaq], c. 1790s – early 1834), also known as Tattannoeuck or Augustus, was an Inuk (Note: Inuk is the singular form of Inuit.) interpreter for two of John Franklin's Arctic expeditions in what is now Canada. Originally from a group of Inuit living 320 km (200 mi) north of Churchill, then part of Rupert's Land, he was employed as an interpreter at the Hudson's Bay Company (HBC) trading post in Churchill, becoming proficient in English and Cree. He explained various geographical and Inuit cultural characteristics to Franklin.

Tatannuaq was hired as one of two Inuit interpreters to accompany Franklin's 1819–1822 Coppermine expedition; during the expedition, Franklin would sometimes send him ahead of the party to scout the terrain, and he helped to communicate with groups they encountered. The expedition was plagued by starvation and by the deaths of the majority of the expedition party on the return journey. He accompanied Franklin on the 1825–1827 Mackenzie River expedition, where he served a diplomatic role and dissuaded Inuit groups from attacking the expedition. After several years of interpreter service at the HBC post at Fort Chimo, he departed to the interior to assist in locating John Ross's expedition, but died due to bad weather a short distance from Fort Resolution in early 1834. The butterfly species Callophrys augustinus and a Northwest Territories lake were named for him.

== Early life ==
Tatannuaq (also spelt Tattannoeuck) was born to an Inuit family in the 1790s, about 320 km (200 mi) north of Churchill, now the Kivalliq Region of Nunavut, Canada, then part of the Rupert's Land territory. His name loosely translates to 'the belly' or 'it is full' in Inuktitut. He had at least one brother. His band regularly travelled by sleigh to Churchill in the spring and wintered along the Hudson Bay coast in igloos. In the summer, they travelled inland to hunt caribou and muskoxen, and hunted seal along the coast before the spring thaws. Although his band frequently traded with Inuit groups further north, Tatannuaq stated he had only been as far north as Chesterfield Inlet.

Tatannuaq's early life. 1) Birthplace. 2) Churchill. 3) Chesterfield Inlet. Base map shows modern political boundaries.

In 1812, Tatannuaq was hired to work at the Hudson's Bay Company (HBC) trading post at Churchill. At the trading post he improved his English and Cree language skills, after already speaking Inuktitut. He then worked as an interpreter for the company, assuming the English name of Augustus. European explorers described him as a proficient writer who frequently wrote as a hobby. George Back, a midshipman, described him as "about 5 feet 1 inch [155 centimeters] high but extremely strong and well made". Leaving the post briefly in 1814, Tatannuaq returned to work for the winter of 1815, then returned to Inuit lands the following year. In 1818, he married a woman of an unknown name; the couple had three sons.

== Coppermine expedition ==
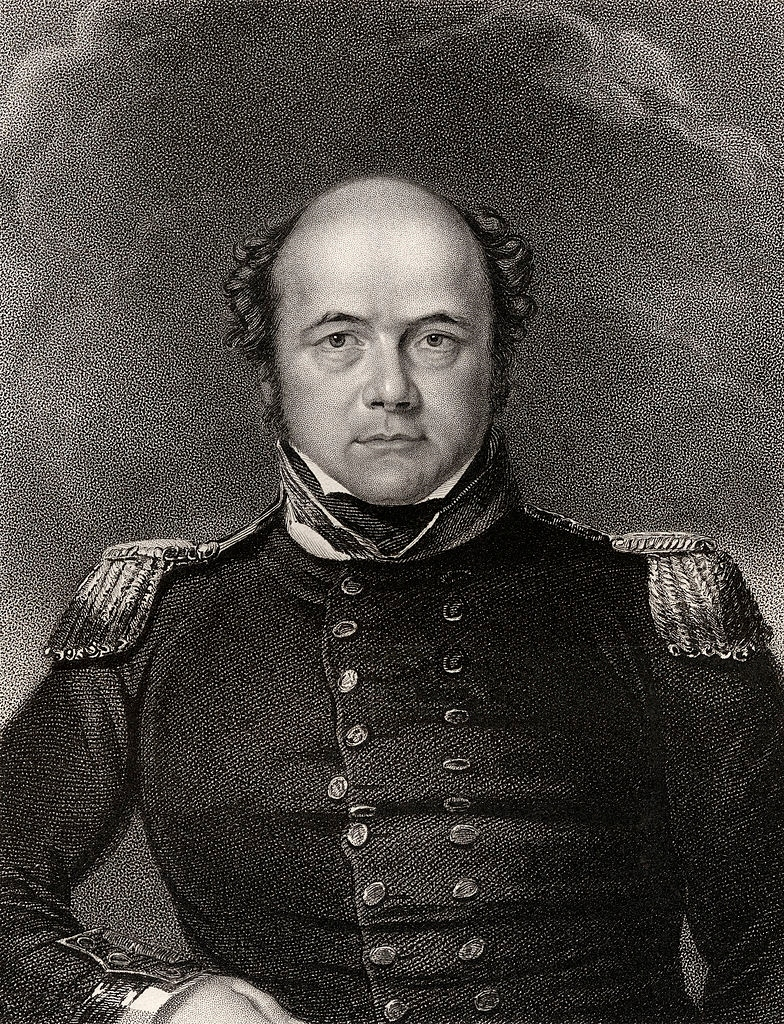
Engraving of John Franklin, captain of the expeditions

=== Beginning the expedition ===
Following the Napoleonic Wars, the British Admiralty placed great emphasis on the discovery of a hypothetical Northwest Passage, a geographic phenomenon that would supposedly offer a viable sea route between the Atlantic and Pacific Oceans. Royal Navy officer John Franklin was appointed to travel by foot from the North American mainland to explore the Arctic coastline, hoping to meet with a concurrent naval expedition by William Edward Parry intending to traverse Lancaster Sound. Franklin hired Inuit interpreters for the expedition to advise him on the shape of the shorelines and facilitate trade with communities they met along the route.

Tatannuaq, still in Inuit territory, was hired as an interpreter for the expedition in 1820. On June 30, alongside another Inuk interpreter named Hoeootoerock, he arrived at York Factory. The two arrived at Norway House by August 14, reaching Cumberland House nine days later. From Cumberland House, they joined a large party departing towards Fort Chipewyan. Departing from the fort on October 1 alongside a fur brigade headed to Fort Resolution, they reached Great Slave Lake a week later. Although HBC trader Robert McVicar attempted to negotiate the interpreters' passage to Fort Providence aboard a North West Company (NWC) canoe, the vessel was unable to take additional weight, and the interpreters were forced to camp amidst winter weather by the HBC post at Moose Deer Island, near Fort Resolution. The two built an igloo on the island, and in December were found by NWC representative Willard Wentzel and fellow interpreter Pierre St. Germain, who escorted them to the expedition. They arrived at Franklin's post at Fort Enterprise in late January 1821. (Note: Some sources state that they arrived on January 25 while others state that they arrived on January 27.)

Coppermine expedition. 1) York Factory. 2) Norway House. 3) Cumberland House. 4) Fort Chipewyan 5) Fort Resolution. 6) Fort Providence. 7) Fort Enterprise. 8) Coppermine River mouth. 9) Kiillinnguyaq. Base map shows modern political boundaries.

Franklin attempted to discern the abilities of the two interpreters by comparing their speech to an Inuttitut (an Inuit dialect from northern Labrador) gospel. Presented with regional maps, Tatannuaq recognized geographical features he had not visited, such as Chesterfield Inlet, and gave details on geographic features not on the map. He explained that his community had traded with three different groups who claimed to reside in an area north of his home. In April, he constructed an igloo with Hoeootoerock and explained its construction to Franklin, who detailed the process meticulously in his diaries. Both Tatannuaq and Hoeootoerock were regarded as helpful and good-spirited interpreters by the expedition party. George Back wrote that Tatannuaq was a great chief who acted with superiority over Hoeootoerock. Tatannuaq also insisted that other expedition members treat him with similar deference to that of an officer. Tatannuaq spent time writing and smoking.

=== At Coppermine River ===
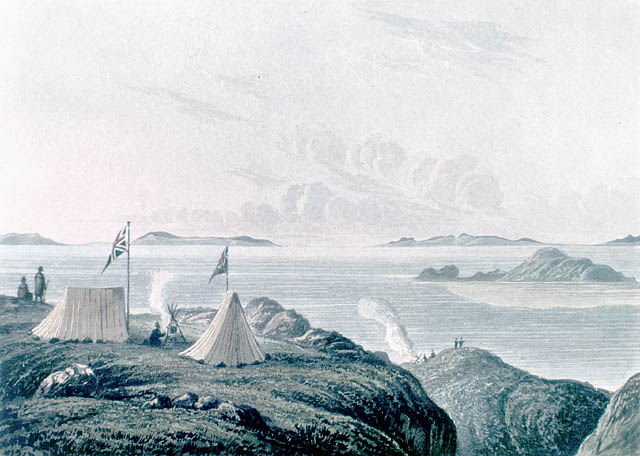
Expedition camp at the mouth of the Coppermine River, 1821

Franklin's party, departing from Fort Enterprise on June 14, 1821, was the first British mission to descend the Coppermine River since Samuel Hearne's expedition in the early 1770s, which had allegedly led to the mass killing of Inuit at Bloody Falls. Reaching the falls in July 1821, Tatannuaq and Hoeootoerock were sent ahead of the party to attempt contact with local people. The two spoke with a group of Inuit camped along the river, but the news of a visiting British expedition prompted the group to flee the area. After informing Franklin of the presence of local Inuit, Tatannuaq set out again the following day to meet with them. A brief encounter with a small group kayaking along the river was interrupted by the arrival of Franklin and a group of scouts he had recruited from the Yellowknives, causing the Inuit to once again flee.

Tatannuaq and Hoeootoerock crossed the Coppermine River and encountered an elderly Inuk man named Terregannoeuck or White Fox, who attempted to fight the interpreters. Tatannuaq was able to calm the man, who talked with Franklin's party after receiving various gifts. Tatannuaq returned the following day with gifts for Terregannoeuck and his wife, attempting to learn the local geography, but received little information. Terregannoeuck offered one of his daughters as a wife to Tatannuaq, who declined. The party advanced to the mouth of the river and turned east. From July to August, they charted 1,086 km (675 mi) of the Arctic coastline, but were forced to halt at Point Turnagain on Kiillinnguyaq (Kent Peninsula) on August 18.

=== Return ===
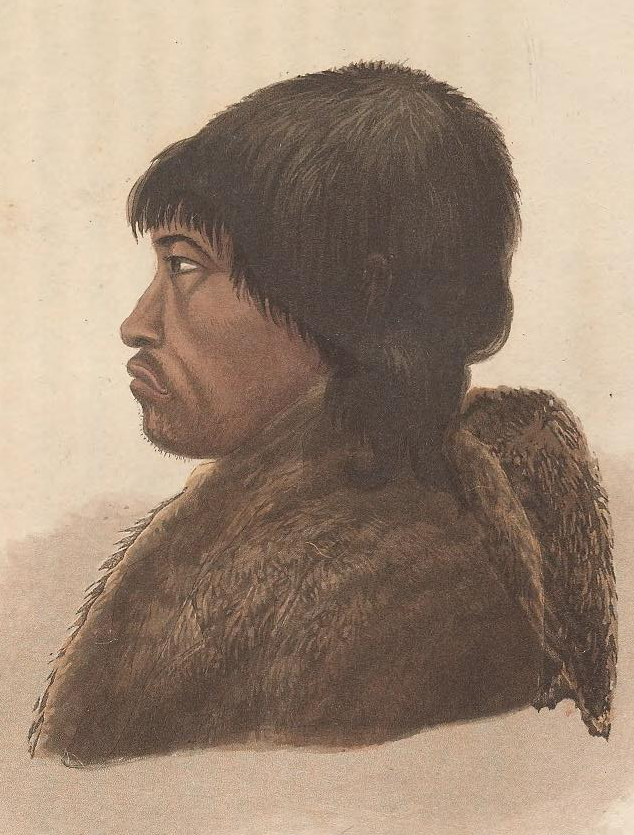
Portrait of Tatannuaq by George Back, 1823

Hoeootoerock went missing following a hunting trip, carrying vital supplies including knives and ammunition. Tatannuaq searched for him for a day and a half but he was not found. Irritated by the party's slow progress on the return journey, Tatannuaq proceeded ahead and became lost in the unfamiliar terrain; he found his way to Fort Enterprise a few days later and reunited with the expedition. Weakened from hunger, the party resorted to eating leather, maggots, and rock tripe. On October 20, Tatannuaq, Franklin and voyageur (French Canadian fur trader) Joseph Benoit left for Fort Providence to get supplies and aid; after breaking a snowshoe, Franklin went back to Fort Enterprise while Tatannuaq and Benoit continued the journey.

The duo reached the Yellowknives chief Akaitcho's camp on November 3. They were joined by other expedition members and requested aid, which was granted by Akaitcho. Two small relief parties were sent to Fort Enterprise carrying meat. The expedition party then departed and reached Fort Providence on December 11, before proceeding to Fort Chipewyan over the following weeks. After recuperating at Fort Chipewyan for several months, the party departed to Norway House, reaching the post on June 2, 1822, before disbanding. Tatannuaq was one of only nine survivors of the twenty who began the expedition.

Tatannuaq returned to Fort Churchill in the summer of 1822. While living at Fort Churchill, he learned that his wife had been married to a brother of Hoeootoerock, who had later killed himself, fearing Tatannuaq's retaliation. Tatannuaq was warned that one of Hoeootoerock's brothers sought revenge on him for this. Hoeootoerock's band thought Tatannuaq was at least partially responsible for his disappearance and ostracised him. Tatannuaq was forced to fish every day, which he struggled with. In August, he met the Anglican missionary John West, the first non-Moravian missionary to preach to the Inuit. During West's 1822 and 1823 visits to Churchill and York Factory, Tatannuaq served as his interpreter and converted to Christianity. He returned north to reunite with his family alongside a group of Inuit who had come to see West.

== Mackenzie River expedition ==
Mackenzie River expedition. 1) York Factory. 2) Norway House. 3) Cumberland House. 4) Mathye Portage. 5) Fort Franklin. 6) Mackenzie River Mouth. Base map shows modern political boundaries.

Tatannuaq was hired as an interpreter for Franklin's Mackenzie River expedition in the spring of 1825. Franklin encouraged Tatannuaq to bring Ooligbuck, who would apprentice with Tatannuaq to become an intermediary. The party departed from York Factory on June 25 and walked from Churchill to Cumberland House. They joined an advance party alongside various carpenters and boatmen, then walked the Methye Portage, which links the Churchill River basin to the Athabasca. Franklin, accompanied by Tatannuaq, led a small scouting party down the Mackenzie as others made preparations for winter. The group encountered a band of Dene who prepared to fight, but were calmed and surprised by Tatannuaq's presence. Franklin wrote that Tatannuaq reacted modestly to the great interest and admiration of the Dene, who were fascinated by the great distance the Inuk had travelled.

=== Inuit raid and negotiation ===
The expedition wintered at a post they named Fort Franklin, on the western shore of Great Bear Lake. Descending down the Great Bear and Mackenzie rivers in the summer of 1826, the group split in two at the Mackenzie Delta, with Tatannuaq accompanying Franklin's party of sixteen men travelling west towards Kotzebue Sound. On July 7, the party's boats were grounded by the low tide at the mouth of the Mackenzie River. Several hundred Inuit pillaged the party's boats, while Tatannuaq pleaded with them to leave; they left after Tatannuaq told them that the Englishmen would shoot them.

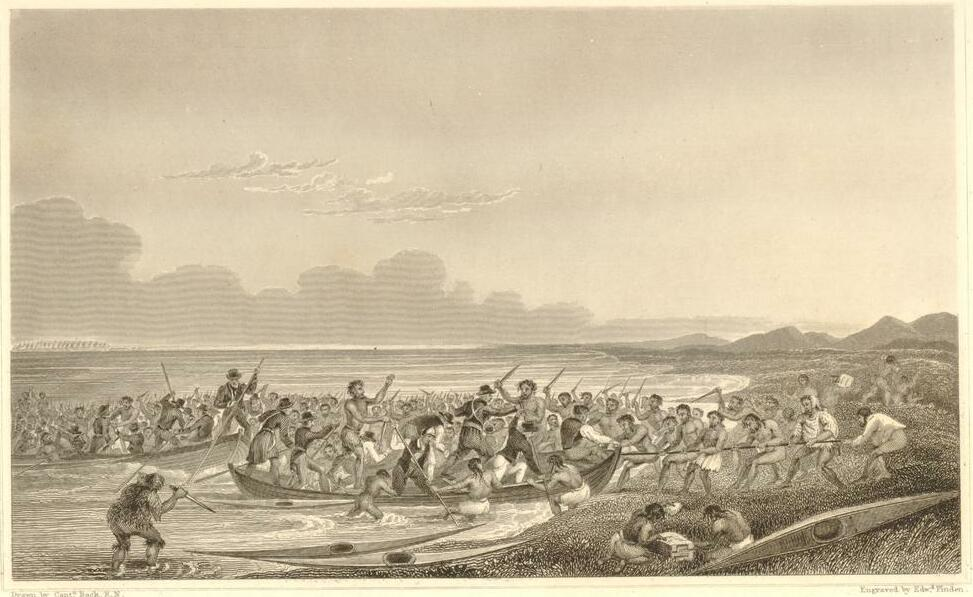
Engraving of the expedition being attacked by Inuit after a sketch by George Back, 1828

Soon after, the expedition encountered a group of eight Inuit who approached them in shallow water off the Arctic coast, requesting to speak with Tatannuaq. Franklin, initially disapproving, allowed him to go to shore unarmed. Tatannuaq spoke to a group of around forty Inuit, scolding them for the raid on the expedition, and threatened that he would have shot and killed them if they had killed any of the Europeans. He tried to convince the group to trade with the Europeans, but Franklin decided to leave the area quickly, fearing another attack. The party continued the expedition and disbanded upon returning to Norway House in June 1827; Tatannuaq reportedly wept at the end of the expedition.

== Later life and death ==
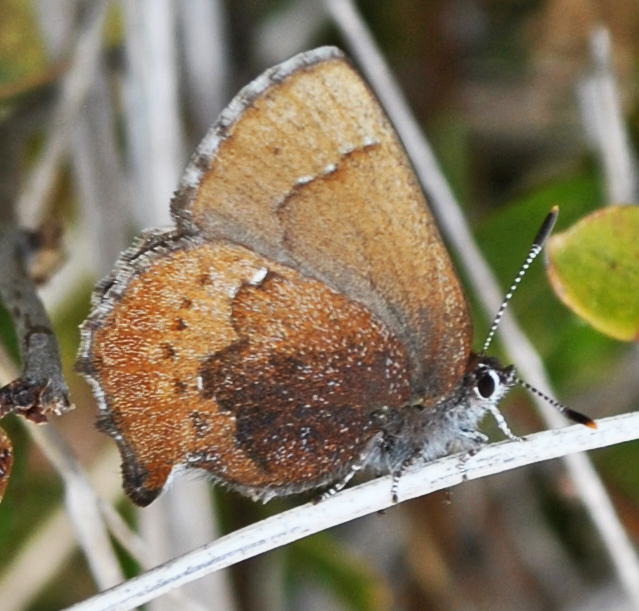
The butterfly Callophrys augustinus, named for Tatannuaq's nickname, Augustus

From 1827 to 1830 Tatannuaq worked for HBC at Churchill, but would at times journey north to visit his family. Aboard the brig Montcalm, he worked as an interpreter at the newly founded HBC post of Fort Chimo (Kuujjuaq) on Ungava Bay (now part of Quebec) in September 1830. Alongside Ooglibuck, he worked under trader Nicol Finlayson until 1833.

In 1833, Tatannuaq learned that George Back was mounting a search for John Ross's second Arctic expedition, presumed lost, and hurried to join Back's search party. He possibly arrived at York Factory in September 1833 and proceeded to Churchill. Despite an injured leg, he travelled 1,900 km (1,200 mi) on foot through winter weather to Fort Resolution, possibly accompanying the post's messenger. Arriving at the post in mid-February 1834, he learned that Back had advanced to Fort Reliance. Alongside a Canadian voyageur and an Iroquois scout, Tatannuaq departed to Fort Reliance. When the party became lost, his two companions abandoned him to return to Fort Resolution, and Tatannuaq was stuck in bad weather around 32 km (20 mi) from the fort; his body was found at Jean River. Back did not locate Ross, and later learned that Ross had safely returned to England in early 1834.

== Legacy ==
Following Tatannuaq's death, Back and George Simpson, a colonial governor of HBC, wrote fondly of his service and character, mourning his death. Finlayson eulogized him less favourably, describing him as a good interpreter but a "bad hunter" and "drunken sot." Callophrys augustinus (brown elfin), a butterfly first collected by John Richardson on the 1827 Mackenzie River expedition, was named for Tatannuaq (from his nickname Augustus), as was Augustus Lake near Great Bear Lake.
