= Cyperus cephalanthus =

Scientific classification
- Kingdom: Plantae
- Clade: Tracheophytes
- Clade: Angiosperms
- Clade: Monocots
- Clade: Commelinids
- Order: Poales
- Family: Cyperaceae
- Genus: Cyperus
- Species: C. cephalanthus

Binomial name
- Cyperus cephalanthus Torr. & Hook.

Species of sedge

Cyperus cephalanthus, commonly known as the buttonbush flatsedge, is a species of sedge that is native to southern parts of North America and South America.

== Taxonomy ==
Cyperus cephalanthus was jointly named and described by the American botanist John Torrey and the English botanist William Jackson Hooker. In an influential monograph published in 1836, Torrey acknowledged the many contributions of Hooker, which included "a set of Mr. Drummond's plants collected in Louisiana and Texas".. The acknowledgment refers to the Scottish naturalist Thomas Drummond who collected the type specimen. As of February 2026, the botanical name Cyperus cephalanthus Torr. & Hook. is widely accepted.

== See also ==
- List of Cyperus species

== Bibliography ==
- Torrey, John (1836). "Monograph of the North American Cyperaceae". Annals of the Lyceum of Natural History of New York. 3: 239–448.
