= Cyperus drummondii =

Conservation status
- Least Concern (IUCN 3.1)

Scientific classification
- Kingdom: Plantae
- Clade: Tracheophytes
- Clade: Angiosperms
- Clade: Monocots
- Clade: Commelinids
- Order: Poales
- Family: Cyperaceae
- Genus: Cyperus
- Species: C. drummondii

Binomial name
- Cyperus drummondii Torr. & Hook.

Synonyms
- Cyperus robustus Kunth; Cyperus virens var. drummondii (Torr. & Hook.) Kük.

Species of sedge

Cyperus drummondii, commonly known as Drummond's sedge, is a species of sedge, that is native to the southern parts of North America, parts of Central America, and northern parts of South America.

== Taxonomy ==
Cyperus drummondii was jointly named and described by the American botanist John Torrey and the English botanist William Jackson Hooker. In an influential monograph published in 1836, Torrey acknowledged the many contributions of Hooker, which included "a set of Mr. Drummond's plants collected in Louisiana and Texas".. The acknowledgment refers to the Scottish naturalist Thomas Drummond who collected the type specimen. Torrey named the species in Drummond's honor. As of February 2026, the botanical name Cyperus drummondii Torr. & Hook. is widely accepted.

== See also ==
- List of Cyperus species

== Bibliography ==
- Torrey, John (1836). "Monograph of the North American Cyperaceae". Annals of the Lyceum of Natural History of New York. 3: 239–448.
