= Cyperus setigerus =

Conservation status
- Apparently Secure (NatureServe)

Scientific classification
- Kingdom: Plantae
- Clade: Tracheophytes
- Clade: Angiosperms
- Clade: Monocots
- Clade: Commelinids
- Order: Poales
- Family: Cyperaceae
- Genus: Cyperus
- Species: C. setigerus

Binomial name
- Cyperus setigerus Torr. & Hook.

Species of sedge

Cyperus setigerus is a species of sedge that is native to central and southern parts of the United States, recorded from Kansas, Oklahoma, Texas, Missouri, and New Mexico.

== Taxonomy ==
Cyperus setigerus was jointly named and described by the American botanist John Torrey and the English botanist William Jackson Hooker. In an influential monograph published in 1836, Torrey acknowledged the many contributions of Hooker, which included "a set of Mr. Drummond's plants collected in Louisiana and Texas".. The acknowledgment refers to the Scottish naturalist Thomas Drummond who collected the type specimen. As of February 2026, the botanical name Cyperus setigerus Torr. & Hook. is widely accepted.

The classical spelling of the specific epithet setigerus in the nominative masculine is setiger. However, Articles 23 and 60 of the International Code of Nomenclature for algae, fungi, and plants do not allow for subsequent emendation in this case since none of the stated exceptions are met.

== See also ==
- List of Cyperus species

== Bibliography ==
- McKenzie, P. M.; Newbold, C. (2020). "A second, possibly native, extant population of Cyperus setiger in Missouri" (PDF). Missouriensis. 38: 8–12.
- Torrey, John (1836). "Monograph of the North American Cyperaceae". Annals of the Lyceum of Natural History of New York. 3: 239–448.
