= Robert Hood (explorer) =

Royal Navy lieutenant (1797–1821)

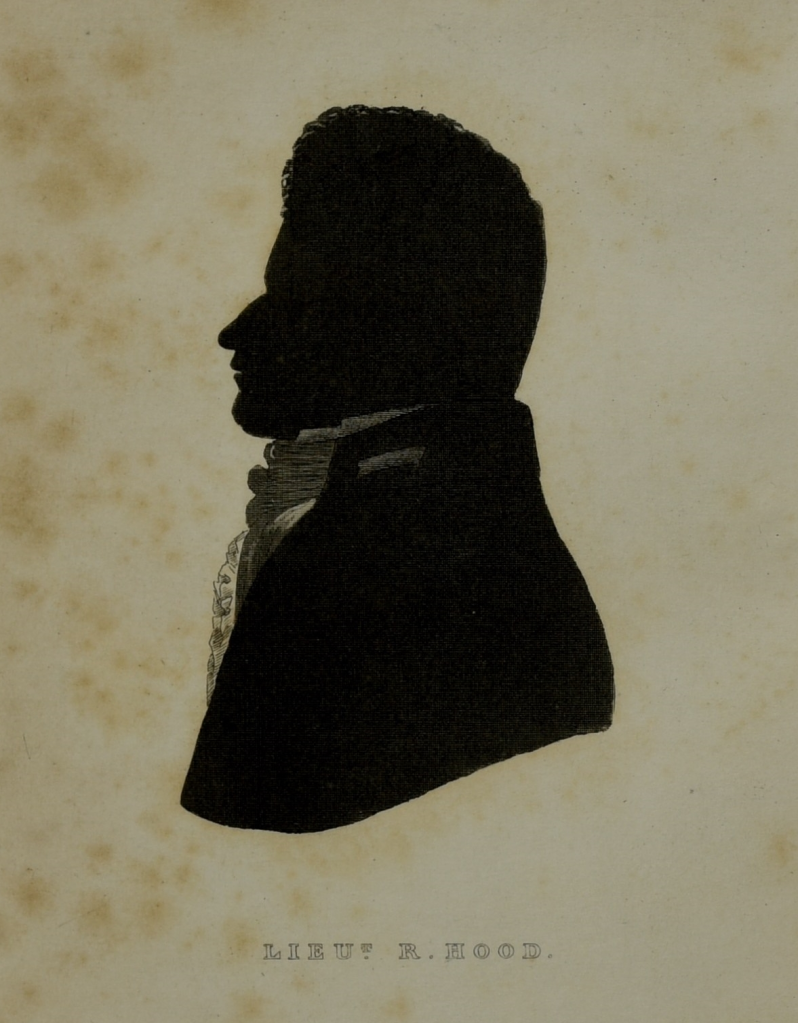
- Born: 1797; Portarlington, Ireland
- Died: 21 October 1821 (aged 23–24) near Lake Providence, Northwest Territories
- Military career
- Allegiance: United Kingdom
- Branch: Royal Navy
- Service years: 1809–1821
- Rank: Lieutenant

Robert Hood (1797–21 October 1821), born in Portarlington, Ireland, was an Anglo-Irish Royal Navy officer, explorer of the Canadian Arctic, and military artist.

In 1819, Hood was appointed midshipman on the Coppermine expedition, where he, along with George Back, was an official artist. In addition to documenting the expedition with watercolour paintings, he kept a journal which was used by John Franklin to complete his official account of the expedition, and recorded important meteorological, magnetic and auroral data. Hood was the first person to note the electromagnetic nature of the Aurora Borealis.

In 1820, while overwintering in Fort Enterprise, Hood fathered a baby girl with a fifteen-year-old Yellowknives girl known as Greenstockings, whose family was also staying there for the winter. Prior to this, he and Back almost duelled with pistols over the affections of Greenstockings.

Hood was allegedly murdered on 21 October 1821 by an Iroquois voyageur, Michel Terohaute, who had supposedly turned to cannibalism, and who was summarily executed by John Richardson a few days later. Hood's promotion to lieutenant came in January 1821, the news of which did not reach the party until 15 December 1821.
