= Akaitcho Lake =

Lake in Canada

- Location in Nunavut
- Location: Kitikmeot Region, Nunavut
- Coordinates: 66°32′N 115°40′W
- Primary inflows: Coppermine River
- Basin countries: Canada

Akaitcho Lake is a natural lake in the Kitikmeot Region, Nunavut, Canada. It is fed by the Coppermine River.

The lake is named after Akaitcho, Chief of the Yellowknives.
