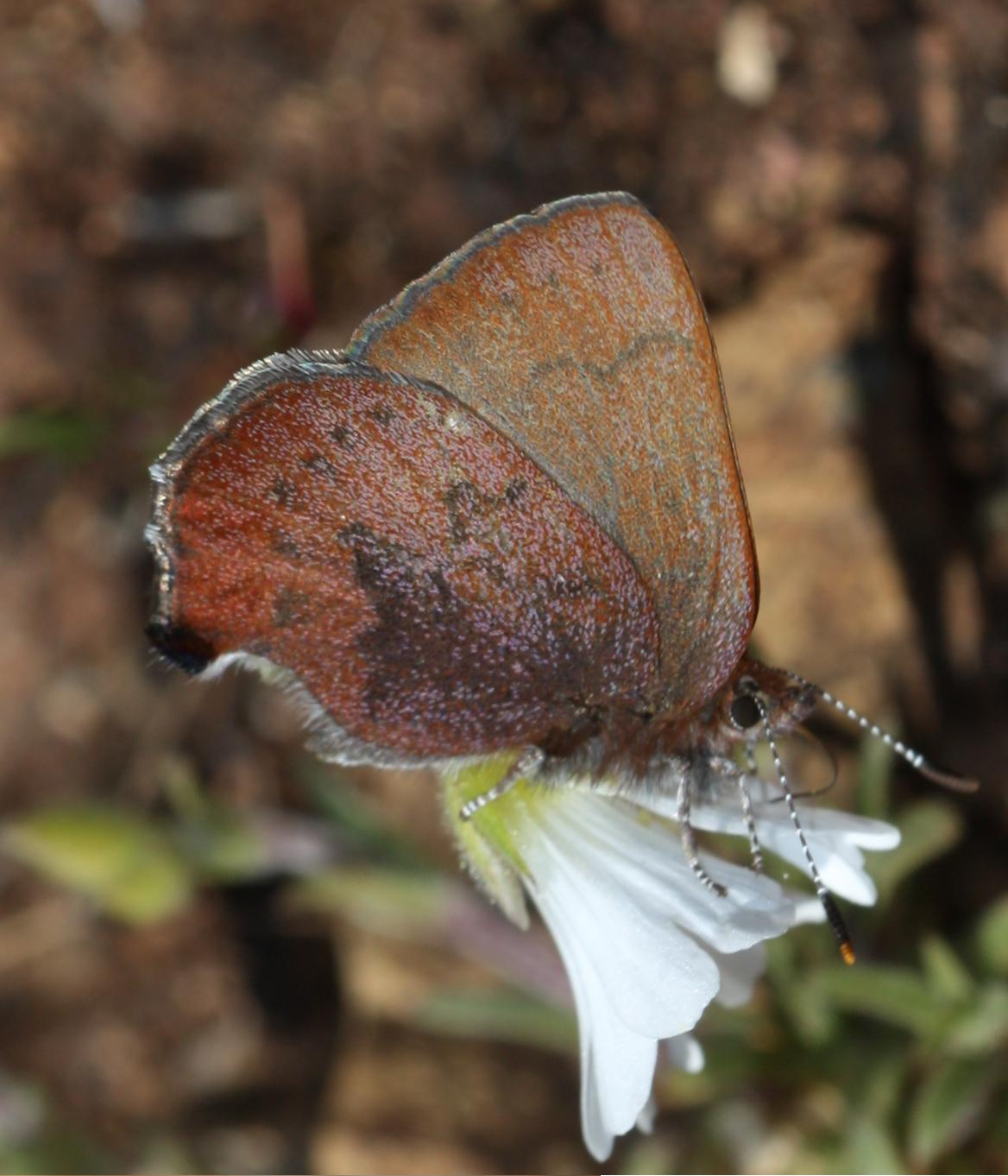

Conservation status
- Secure (NatureServe)

Scientific classification
- Kingdom: Animalia
- Phylum: Arthropoda
- Clade: Pancrustacea
- Class: Insecta
- Order: Lepidoptera
- Family: Lycaenidae
- Genus: Callophrys
- Species: C. augustinus

Binomial name
- Callophrys augustinus (Westwood, 1852)

Synonyms
- Thecla augustus Kirby, 1837 (preocc. Fabricius, 1793); Thecla augustinus Westwood, 1852 (Replacement name); Incisalia augustinus (Westwood, 1852); Deciduphagus augustinus (Westwood, 1852); Thecla iroides Boisduval, 1852; Thecla iroides var. immaculata Cockle, 1910 (preocc. Fuchs, 1891); Incisalia iroides(Boisduval, 1852)

= Callophrys augustinus =

Species of butterfly

Callophrys augustinus, the brown elfin, is a species of butterfly of the family Lycaenidae, found from Alaska to northern Mexico. One of its subspecies, C. augustinus iroides, is known as the western elfin.

== Taxonomy ==
This species was first collected by John Richardson in 1827. The specific epithet, augustinus, was chosen in honor of Inuit interpreter Tatannuaq, who was also known as Augustus.

=== Subspecies ===
- Callophrys augustinus annettae (dos Passos, 1943) – USA (New Mexico)
- Callophrys augustinus augustinus (Westwood, 1852) – Canada
- Callophrys augustinus concava Austin, 1998 – USA (Nevada)
- Callophrys augustinus croesioides (Scudder, 1876) – Canada
- Callophrys augustinus helenae (dos Passos, 1943) – – Canada (Newfoundland)
- Callophrys augustinus iroides (Boisduval, 1852) – Canada (British Columbia) to USA (California) and Mexico (Baja California).

== Distribution ==
It is found from Newfoundland north and west through the northern United States and the prairie provinces to Alaska. To the south it ranges in Appalachian Mountains to northern Georgia and northern Alabama, further south through the western mountains to northern Baja California in Mexico.

== Ecology ==
The larvae feed on Ericaceae species, including Vaccinium vacillans and Ledum groenlandicum in the east. They feed on a wide variety of plants in the west, including Arbutus and Cuscuta species. They feed on the flowers and fruits of their host plant.

Pupation takes place in the litter at the base of the host plant. Hibernation takes place in the pupal stage.

The adult's wingspan is 22–29 mm. Adults are on wing from early May to early June in one generation. They feed on flower nectar from various species, including Vaccinium, Sanicula arctopoides, Lindera, Salix, Barbarea and Prunus americana.
