= Akaitcho =

Chief of the Yellowknives, an Indigenous Canadian group (ca. 1786–1838)

Chief Akaitcho
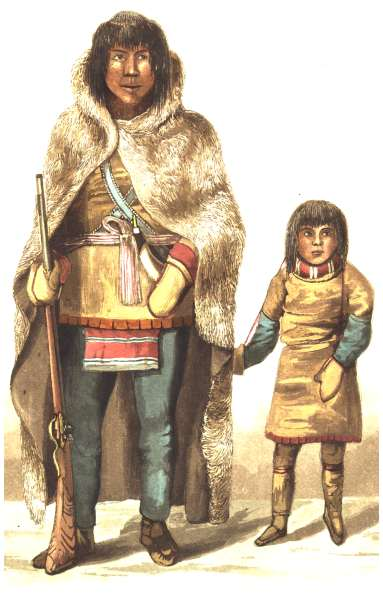
- Portrait of Chief Akaitcho and his only son, by Robert Hood.
- Born: ca. 1786
- Died: Spring 1838
- Resting place: An island in Great Slave Lake's Yellowknife Bay
- Other names: "Big-Foot", or "Big-Feet"
- Known for: Chief of the Yellowknives
- Relatives: François Beaulieu, brother-in-law

Akaitcho (variants: Akaicho or Ekeicho; translation: "Big-Foot" or "Big-Feet"; meaning: "like a wolf with big paws, he can travel long distances over snow") (ca. 1786–1838) was a Copper Indian, and Chief of the Yellowknives. His territory included the region from the eastern portion of the Great Slave Lake, in the Northwest Territories, Canada, to the Coppermine River, in Nunavut. He was recruited to act as interpreter, guide, and hunter for John Franklin's first of three Arctic expeditions, the Coppermine Expedition of 1819–1822.

== Career ==
Akaitcho was considered a man "of great penetration and shrewdness" and an aggressive leader. His tribe, who spoke their own dialect, consisted of the northwesternmost Chipewyan people. They traded meat supplies to the North West Company's Fort Providence trading post, situated on the East Arm of the Great Slave Lake. They were also known for pillaging, stealing women, and killing Dogrib and Hare Indians.

=== Coppermine Expedition ===
In 1820, when his tribe numbered about 190, Akaitcho and his men, including Akaitcho's brothers, Humpy and White Capot, were recruited by the North West Company to serve as guides and hunters for a Royal Navy expedition, a search for the Northwest Passage. Besides Franklin, the expeditionary group consisted of John Richardson, doctor and naturalist, Midshipmen Robert Hood and George Back, and Ordinary Seaman John Hepburn. They met at Fort Providence, on the north side of the lake, in July. Akaitcho's terms included cancellation of his tribe's debts to the North West Company, plus provisions of cloth, ammunition, tobacco, and iron products. In return, his men would hunt and guide for the expedition during its north-bound journey on the Coppermine River, and they would leave food supplies for Franklin's return. But Akaitcho warned Franklin that food would not always be available. They reached the winter encampment of Fort Enterprise on Winter Lake, named by Franklin and chosen by Akaitcho, with food supplies running short and Franklin's men losing faith in him; it would be several months before weather would permit them to continue their travels.

The Franklin expedition restarted again in June 1821 and they reached the Arctic Ocean by July 14. After Franklin issued orders to the Yellowknives to leave food caches along the way back to Fort Enterprise, and to restock Fort Enterprise, the Yellowknives left for their return trip home. However, for several reasons, they did not re-stock Fort Enterprise. First, three of Akaitcho hunters died falling through ice on a frozen lake. Second, Akaitcho did not receive ammunition supplies at Fort Providence, something he needed in order to kill game. But the main reason was Akaitcho's belief that the expedition was folly, and that Franklin's party would not live to return to Fort Enterprise. Within weeks, Back returned to Fort Enterprise, before Franklin, and found it devoid of food. He set off for Fort Providence, eventually reaching it and convincing some of Akaitcho's men to return with him to Fort Enterprise. Back and three Yellowknives returned to Fort Enterprise on 7 November to find the starving Franklin party had arrived. The Yellowknives brought meat, caught fish, and tended to the survivors. A week later, the group left Fort Enterprise, safely reaching Fort Providence on 11 December.

In their subsequently published journals, Franklin referred to the chief as "Akaitcho" or "Big Foot", Richardson referred to him as "Akaicho" or "Gros Pied", and Back referred to him as "Ekeicho".

=== Later years ===
When the Fort Providence trading post closed in 1823, Akaitcho had to trade into Fort Resolution, in competition with Chipewyan already established with that post. His power and influence began to diminish.

Akaitcho became a peacemaker in 1825 when, at Mesa Lake, he participated in a famous peace treaty with Dogrib Chief Edzo, ending a long period of hostility and warfare between Chipewyan and Dogrib.

In 1833-34, when Back returned to Fort Reliance, establishing it as a base camp during his search for the lost John Ross expedition, Akaitcho's energy and resolve commanded Back's respect.

By the time he was 50, Akaitcho was in poor health and his power over his tribe diminished.

== Personal life ==
In addition to brothers Humpy and White Capot (Annoethai-yazzeh), Akaitcho had at least one other brother, Keskarrah, who was known to accompany Matonabbee, a Chipewyan chief. A sister was married to François Beaulieu, a Métis chief.

Of Akaitcho's seven wives, the one that bore him his only son was his favorite. In old age, out of respect, Akaitcho and his elder wives were transported by younger men whenever the tribe moved.

== Legacy ==
Akaicho's legacy is honored with the formation of the Akaitcho Territory Government, a First Nations organization representing the Dene people of the Northwest Territories. Akaitcho Lake, located in Nunavut, between Great Bear Lake and the Coppermine River, is also named in his honor.
