= Old Fort Providence =

Coordinates: 62°16′N 114°10′W

Old Fort Providence, located near the mouth of Yellowknife Bay, Northwest Territories, Canada, was one of the first fur trading outposts on Great Slave Lake. Peter Pond of the North West Company first proposed trading with the Dene around Great Slave Lake in 1786. In 1789, Alexander Mackenzie initiated a period of trade with the Yellowknives and Tłı̨chǫ (formerly known as Dogrib) Dene and instructed his assistant, Laurent Leroux, to start a trading post in this area. The post was not a major centre for fur trading and was used primarily as a supply centre for other, more important trading posts or expeditions. It served, for example, as a base of supply for Sir John Franklin's Coppermine expedition towards the Arctic Ocean in 1820. It was located within a productive fishery used for generations by the Dene around Yellowknife Bay and helped supply meat and fish for traders at Great Slave Lake. The Hudson's Bay Company took over the post in 1821 after the demise of the North West Company, but the settlement was in decline and it closed in 1823. The buildings have long since decayed but the ruins were excavated in 1969-1971.
