= Thomas Drummond (botanist) =

Scottish botanist

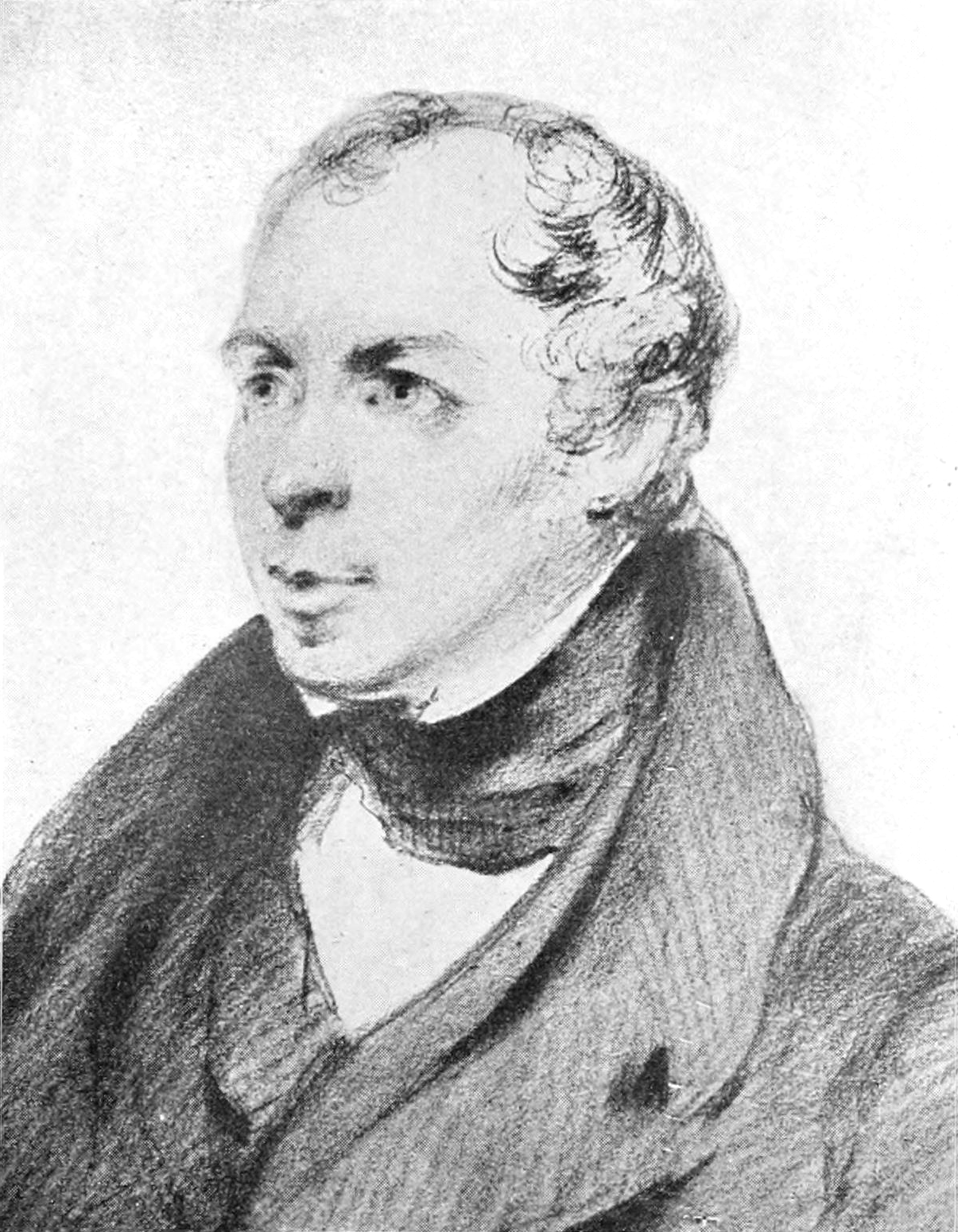
Thomas Drummond

Thomas Drummond (1793 — March 1835), was a Scottish botanical collector.

== Life ==
Thomas Drummond was the younger brother of the botanist James Drummond. He was born in Scotland, and during the early part of his life was at Don's nursery, Forfar. He first became known to botanists by his distributed exsiccatae series with sets of mosses, Musci Scotici 1 and 2. and afterwards was attached as assistant-naturalist to Dr. Richardson in Sir John Franklin's second land expedition, publishing the exsiccata 'Musci Americani; or, specimens of the mosses collected in British North America, and chiefly among the Rocky Mountains, during the Second Land Arctic Expedition under the command of Captain Franklin, R.N. by Thomas Drummond, Assistant Naturalist in 1828.

He accordingly sailed from Liverpool on 16 February 1825 and reached New York on the 15th of the following month. The expedition moved westward by the Hudson River and lakes Ontario and Winnipeg to the Mackenzie River. Drummond quit the main party at Cumberland House to explore the Rocky Mountains.

On 3 June 1827 Drummond met David Douglas at Carlton House as Douglas was venturing overland from Fort Vancouver toward York Factory, Manitoba on his return trip to London, collecting for the Royal Horticultural Society.

In the spring of 1831 Drummond journeyed on foot by the Alleghany Mountains, reaching St. Louis in July, where he fell ill. In consequence of this delay he was unable to join the fur traders on their expedition to the north. He therefore was compelled to confine his explorations to New Orleans and thereabouts. Hence he made a botanical tour in Texas; at Velasco an attack of cholera prostrated him, but on recovering he continued his labours. Drummond collected along the Brazos, Colorado and Guadalupe Rivers, spending almost two years collecting plants and birds in Texas. His plant specimens from Texas were widely distributed in Europe and stimulated later botanical exploration. (Geiser, 1949) He embarked finally for Havana on 9 February 1835 and died at that port early in March. The plants sent home by Drummond were described by Sir William Hooker in his Flora Boreali-Americana, his Journal of Botany, and Companion to the Botanical Magazine. In 1841, after the death of Drummond, Hooker and William Watson published the exsiccata Musci Americani; or, specimens of mosses, Jungermanniae, &c. collected by the late Thomas Drummond, in the Southern States of North America. Arranged and named by W. Wilson and Sir W. J. Hooker with bryophyte specimens collected by Drummond.

He and his brother, James are honoured in 1855, in the Australian plant genus of Drummondita (in the Rutaceae family).

== Other sources ==
- Nisbet, Jack. The Collector: David Douglas and the Natural History of the Northwest (2009) Sasquatch Books. ISBN 1-57061-613-2
- Harvey, Athelstan George. Douglas Of The Fir: A Biography Of David Douglas Botanist (1947) Harvard University Press.
- Lindsay, Ann and Syd House. "The Tree Collector: The Life and Explorations of David Douglas" (1999, 2005) Aurum Press Ltd. ISBN 1-84513-052-9
- Geiser, Samuel Wood. "Naturalists of the Frontier" (1949) Southern Methodist University Press

This article incorporates text from a publication now in the public domain: "Drummond, Thomas (d.1835)". Dictionary of National Biography. London: Smith, Elder & Co. 1885–1900.
