= List of shipwrecks in 1766 =

The List of shipwrecks in 1766 includes some ships sunk, wrecked or otherwise lost during 1766.

table of contents
1766
Jan	Feb	Mar	Apr
May	Jun	Jul	Aug
Sep	Oct	Nov	Dec
Unknown date

== January ==
=== 16 January ===
List of shipwrecks: 16 January 1766
Ship	State	Description
Matthew	Great Britain	The tender, a brig, was lost at Elmina, Gold Coast. All on board were rescued.

=== 25 January ===
List of shipwrecks: 25 January 1766
Ship	State	Description
Charles Town	(Kingdom of Great Britain) British America	The ship was wrecked on the Branclawine Bank, in Delaware Bay. Her crew were rescued. She was on a voyage from Hamburg to Philadelphia, Pennsylvania.

=== Unknown date ===
List of shipwrecks: Unknown date 1766
Ship	State	Description
Benjamin	Great Britain	The ship was lost near Gibraltar. She was on a voyage from Ancona, Papal States to Bristol, Gloucestershire.
Bienvenu	(Kingdom of Great Britain) Jersey	The ship struck a rock and was wrecked at Waterford, Ireland. She was on a voyage from Jersey to Waterford.
Dove	Great Britain	The ship was lost on the Barbary Coast with the loss of five of her ten crew. She was on a voyage from "Saloe" to Guernsey, Channel Islands and Dunkirk, France.
Duc de Bouillon	France	The ship was lost in the Garonne. She was on a voyage from Martinique to Bordeaux.
Laurel of Peace	France	The ship was lost on the French coast. She was on a voyage from Havre de Grâce to Cádiz, Spain.
Providence	Great Britain	The ship ran aground and was wrecked at Tinmouth, County Durham.
Resolution	Great Britain	The ship was lost on the Woolpack, in the North Sea. She was on a voyage from London to Carthagena, Viceroyalty of Peru.

== February ==
=== 11 February ===
List of shipwrecks: 11 February 1766
Ship	State	Description
Maria	Sweden	The ship was driven ashore and wrecked in the Orkney Islands, Great Britain. She was on a voyage from Gothenburg to Belfast, Ireland.
Providence	Great Britain	The ship was wrecked on the Barbary Coast. She was on a voyage from Málaga, Spain to Bristol, Gloucestershire.

=== 14 February ===
List of shipwrecks: 14 February 1766
Ship	State	Description
Tyger	Great Britain	The ship was wrecked at Drogheda, County Louth, Ireland. She was on a voyage from Jamaica to Liverpool, Lancashire.

=== 16 February ===
List of shipwrecks: 16 February 1766
Ship	State	Description
Friendship	Great Britain	The snow was wrecked on the north coast of Jamaica. Her crew were rescued.

=== 18 February ===
List of shipwrecks: 18 February 1766
Ship	State	Description
Meermin	Dutch Republic	Enslaved Malagasy people, on the Dutch East India Company slave ship mutinied, which lead to the ship grounding on Cape Agulhas, southern Africa and breaking up.

=== 20 February ===
List of shipwrecks: 20 February 1766
Ship	State	Description
George	Great Britain	The ship was driven ashore and wrecked at Puerto Rio, Spain.
Eliza Silvester	Great Britain	The ship was driven ashore at Puerto Pio.
Lyon	Great Britain	The ship was driven ashore at Puerto Pio but was later refloated.
Nueva España	Spain	The ship was driven ashore at Fort Puntales. She was on a voyage from Cádiz to Veracruz, Viceroyalty of Peru.

=== 21 February ===
List of shipwrecks: 21 February 1766
Ship	State	Description
Gavavre	Spain	The ship was driven ashore and wrecked at Puerto Pio.
Gulls	Great Britain	The ship was driven ashore at Puerto Pio.

=== Unknown date ===
List of shipwrecks: Unknown date 1766
Ship	State	Description
Ann	Great Britain	The ship was lost on a voyage from Beaumaris, Anglesey to Liverpool, Lancashire.
Augusta	Great Britain	The ship was wrecked on Lindisfarne with the loss of all hands. She was on a voyage from London to Leith, Lothian.
Carron	Great Britain	The ship foundered in the North Sea off Berwick upon Tweed. She was on a voyage from London to Carron, Falkirk, Stirlingshire.
Friendship	Great Britain	The ship was lost near Hull, Yorkshire. She was on a voyage from London to Newcastle upon Tyne, Northumberland.
London	Great Britain	The ship foundered in the North Sea off Dunkirk, France. She was on a voyage from London to Dunkirk.
Lynn Merchant	Great Britain	The ship foundered in the Mediterranean Sea off Cádiz, Spain. She was on a voyage from London to Cádiz.
Mary	Ireland	The ship foundered in the Bay of Biscay off Bordeaux, France.
St. Joseph	France	The ship, being very leaky' was abandoned in St George's Channel. Her crew were rescued by Jane (Great Britain). St. Joseph was on a voyage from Bordeaux to Brest.
Three Brothers	Great Britain	The ship was driven ashore on the coast of Calabria, Kingdom of Sicily. She was on a voyage from Venice and Zant to Bristol, Gloucestershire.
Welcome	Great Britain	The ship was lost near Wexford, Ireland. She was on a voyage from Virginia, British America to Whitehaven, Cumberland.

== March ==
=== 18 March ===
List of shipwrecks: 18 March 1766
Ship	State	Description
Drie Gebroeders	Dutch Republic	The ship was wrecked on the Goodwin Sands, Kent, Great Britain. Her crew were rescued. She was on a voyage from Campveer to Bilbao, Spain.

=== 22 March ===
List of shipwrecks: 22 March 1766
Ship	State	Description
Emanuel	(Denmark) Norway	The ship was driven ashore and wrecked at Fécamp, France. She was on a voyage from Norway to Mount's Bay, Great Britain

=== 24 March ===
List of shipwrecks: 24 March 1766
Ship	State	Description
Dublin Merchant	Ireland	The ship was driven ashore near Newport, Monmouthshire. She was on a voyage from Liverpool, Lancashire to Ostend, Dutch Republic. She was later refloated.

=== Unknown date ===
List of shipwrecks: Unknown date 1766
Ship	State	Description
Charlotte	Ireland	The ship was driven ashore at Figueira da Foz, Portugal. She was on a voyage from Ireland to Gibraltar.
Dorsetshire	Great Britain	The ship was lost near Beachy Head, Sussex. She was on a voyage from Weymouth, Dorset to London.
Europe	Great Britain	The ship was lost whilst on a voyage from Workington, Cumberland to Cork, Ireland.
James	France	The ship was driven ashore and wrecked near Boulogne. she was on a voyage from Menton to Copenhagen, Denmark.
Meermin	Dutch East India Company	Meermin slave mutiny: The hoeker ran aground in Struisbaai. She was subsequently declared a total loss.
Nancy	Ireland	The ship was driven ashore and wrecked 40 nautical miles (74 km) north of Cádiz, Spain. She was on a voyage from Dublin to Cádiz.
Providence	Great Britain	The ship foundered in the Irish Sea off Wexford, Ireland. She was on a voyage from King's Lynn, Norfolk to Liverpool, Lancashire.
Rottenburg	Great Britain	The ship was lost ad Cádiz. She was on a voyage from Philadelphia, Pennsylvania to Cádiz.
Three Brothers	Great Britain	The ship foundered in St. George's Channel.
Vulture	Great Britain	The ship was lost near Seaford, Sussex. She was on a voyage from Marseille to Dunkirk, France.
Willingmind	Great Britain	The ship was driven ashore and wrecked at Cádiz.

== April ==
=== 12 April ===
List of shipwrecks: 12 April 1766
Ship	State	Description
Clifton	Great Britain	The ship was lost at Madeira. Her crew were rescued. She was on a voyage from Bristol, Gloucestershire to Madeira and Barbados.

=== 29 April ===
List of shipwrecks: 29 April 1766
Ship	State	Description
Louisa Ulrica	Sweden	The ship was wrecked on the Goodwin Sands, Kent, Great Britain. Her crew survived. She was on a voyage from Cagliari, Sardinia to Gothenburg.

=== Unknown date ===
List of shipwrecks: Unknown date 1766
Ship	State	Description
Frederica Dorothea	Stettin	The ship foundered in the Skaggerak off Skagen, Denmark. She was on a voyage from Amsterdam, Dutch Republic to Stettin.
Goldfinch	Great Britain	The ship ran aground and was wrecked at South Shields, County Durham.
Great Admiral	Great Britain	The ship ran aground off Skagen, Denmark. She was on a voyage from Liverpool, Lancashire to Danzig.
Nancy	Great Britain	The ship foundered in the Irish Sea on or after 18 April with the loss of all hands. She was on a voyage from Milford Pembrokeshire to Liverpool.
Plymouth Merchant	Great Britain	The ship foundered in the Atlantic Ocean off Land's End, Cornwall. She was on a voyage from Plymouth, Devon to Liverpool.

== May ==
=== 9 May ===
List of shipwrecks: 9 May 1766
Ship	State	Description
Granada	Great Britain	The ship foundered in the Atlantic Ocean. Her crew were rescued. She was on a voyage from London to Quebec.

=== Unknown date ===
List of shipwrecks: Unknown date 1766
Ship	State	Description
Dove	Great Britain	The ship was lost near "Masterland" with the loss of four of her crew. She was on a voyage from South Shields, County Durham to Rostock.
Industry	Great Britain	The ship was lost at Porto, Portugal. She was on a voyage from South Carolina, British America to Porto.
Louisa Sophia	Stettin	The ship was driven ashore at Aalburg, Sweden. She was on a voyage from Stettin to London, Great Britain.
Richard	Great Britain	The ship ran aground and sank at Porto, Portugal whilst departing for London.
St. George	Great Britain	The ship foundered in The Swin. She was on a voyage from Sunderland, County Durham to London.

== June ==
=== 12 June ===
List of shipwrecks: 12 June 1766
Ship	State	Description
Love & Unity	Great Britain	The ship foundered in the Atlantic Ocean. Her crew were rescued by Molly (Ireland). She was on a voyage from South Carolina, British America to London.

=== 13 June ===
List of shipwrecks: 13 June 1766
Ship	State	Description
Falmouth	British East India Company	The East Indiaman ran aground on the Sagar Sands, India and was wrecked.

=== 21 June ===
List of shipwrecks: 21 June 1766
Ship	State	Description
Sarah	Great Britain	The galley was wrecked off Málaga and abandoned by her crew. She subsequently sank.

=== 26 June ===
List of shipwrecks: 26 June 1766
Ship	State	Description
HMS St Lawrence	(Kingdom of Great Britain) Royal Navy	The schooner was lost off Ingonish, Nova Scotia, British America with the loss of four of her crew.

=== Unknown date ===
List of shipwrecks: Unknown date 1766
Ship	State	Description
Charming Nancy	Great Britain	The ship foundered in the Atlantic Ocean. Her crew were rescued. She was on a voyage from Falmouth, Cornwall to Boston, Massachusetts, British America.
Elizabeth	Ireland	The ship was driven ashore about 20 nautical miles (37 km) from Cork. She was on a voyage from Dublin to Jamaica.
Fortune	Ireland	The ship was wrecked on the Goodwin Sands, Kent, Great Britain. She was on a voyage from Larwick, Norway to Dublin.

== July ==
=== 21 July ===
List of shipwrecks: 21 July 1766
Ship	State	Description
Endeavour	Ireland	The ship was wrecked on the Goodwin Sands, Kent, Great Britain. Her crew were rescued. She was on a voyage from Rotterdam, Dutch Republic to Dublin.

=== 22 July ===
List of shipwrecks: 22 July 1766
Ship	State	Description
Fanny & Betty	Great Britain	The ship was driven ashore and wrecked at Great Orme Head, Caernarfonshire. She was on a voyage from Liverpool, Lancashire to Plymouth, Devon.

=== Unknown date ===
List of shipwrecks: Unknown date 1766
Ship	State	Description
Commerce	Great Britain	The ship was lost at Domesnes, Norway.
Globe's Assistance	Great Britain	The ship was lost at Falsterbo, Sweden.
Nancy	Ireland	The ship sprang a leak and was abandoned by her crew, leaving the passengers on board. She subsequently foundered. Nancy was on a voyage from Cork to Dublin.
Santa Barbara	Spain	The ship was lost off Bahamas on 16 or 17 July with the loss of all but seven of her crew. She was on a voyage from Spanish Honduras to Cádiz.

== August ==
=== 10 August ===
List of shipwrecks: 10 August 1766
Ship	State	Description
John & Stephen	Ireland	The ship was wrecked at Eon Eyra, 10 leagues (30 nautical miles (56 km)) east of Curaçao. She was on a voyage from Cork to Curaçoa.

=== 14 August ===
List of shipwrecks: 14 August 1766
Ship	State	Description
Two Sisters	Great Britain	The ship was wrecked on Bornholm, Denmark. She was on a voyage from Narva, Russia to Hull, Yorkshire.

=== 22 August ===
List of shipwrecks: 22 August 1766
Ship	State	Description
Thomas	Ireland	The ship was driven ashore and wrecked in Rocky Bay, County Cork with the loss of two of her crew. She was on a voyage from Barbados to Cork.

=== 24 August ===
List of shipwrecks: 24 August 1766
Ship	State	Description
Fair American	Great Britain	The ship was driven ashore at Parkgate, Cheshire. She was on a voyage from Parkgate to South Carolina, British America.

=== 25 August ===
List of shipwrecks: 25 August 1766
Ship	State	Description
Ann	Great Britain	The ship foundered in the English Channel off Dover, Kent. Her crew survived. She was on a voyage from Dunkirk, Kingdom of France to Gibraltar.

== September ==
=== 6 September ===
List of shipwrecks: 6 September 1766
Ship	State	Description
El Nuevo Constante	Spain	The frigate foundered in a hurricane 70 leagues (210 nautical miles (390 km) west of New Orleans, Louisiana. Her crew were rescued.
Marquis of Grandby	Great Britain	The ship was wrecked on the Aldborough Knaps, in the North Sea. She was on a voyage from Newcastle upon Tyne, Northumberland to London.

=== 10 September ===
List of shipwrecks: 10 September 1766
Ship	State	Description
Charming Nelly	Great Britain	The ship was driven ashore and wrecked at Shoeburyness, Essex. She was on a voyage from Antigua to London.
Indian Trader	Great Britain	The ship was wrecked in the Caicos Islands. Her crew were rescued. She was on a voyage from Georgia, British America to Jamaica.

=== 11 September ===
List of shipwrecks: 11 September 1766
Ship	State	Description
Hopewell	Great Britain	The ship was destroyed by fire at Riga, Russia.

=== 15 September ===
List of shipwrecks: 15 September 1766
Ship	State	Description
New Success	Great Britain	The ship was wrecked on the Woolpack, in the Thames Estuary. She was on a voyage from Antigua to London.

=== 18 September ===
List of shipwrecks: 18 September 1766
Ship	State	Description
Betsey	Great Britain	The ship was driven ashore and wrecked at Saint Kitts.

=== 30 September ===
List of shipwrecks: 30 September 1766
Ship	State	Description
Royal Africa	Great Britain	The ship was destroyed by an explosion at Popo, Dahomey.

=== Unknown date ===
List of shipwrecks: Unknown date 1766
Ship	State	Description
Diana	Great Britain	The ship was driven ashore and wrecked at Dover, Kent. Her crew survived. She was on a voyage from Granada to London.
Hardy	Great Britain	The ship foundered in the White Sea. She was on a voyage from London to Onega, Russia.
Molly	Great Britain	The ship was destroyed by fire at Liverpool, Lancashire.

== October ==
=== 6 October ===
List of shipwrecks: 6 October 1766
Ship	State	Description
Phenix	Great Britain	The ship was driven ashore and wrecked at Saint Kitts.
Three Friends	Great Britain	The ship was driven ashore and wrecked at Saint Kitts.

=== 16 October ===
List of shipwrecks: 16 October 1766
Ship	State	Description
Diana	Great Britain	The ship was lost at Newfoundland, British America. Her crew were rescued.

=== 17 October ===
List of shipwrecks: 17 October 1766
Ship	State	Description
Plumper	Great Britain	The ship was driven ashore at Kingston, Jamaica.

=== 24 October ===
List of shipwrecks: 24 October 1766
Ship	State	Description
Rebecca	Great Britain	The ship was driven ashore in a hurricane at Rose Island, Spanish Florida.
Wetherill	Great Britain	The brig was driven ashore in a hurricane at Pensacola, Spanish Florida with the loss of all but three of her crew.

=== 25 October ===
List of shipwrecks: 25 October 1766
Ship	State	Description
Svyataya Yekaterina (Святая Екатерина, 'St. Catherine')	Imperial Russian Navy	The brigantine was driven ashore and wrecked 2 km (1.2 mi) south of the mouth of the ru:Utka, Kamchatka. Her crew were rescued.
Svyatoy Gavriil (Святой Гавриил, 'St. Gabriel')	Imperial Russian Navy	The ship was driven ashore in the mouth of the Bolshaya, Kamchatka. She was later refloated and repaired.
Svyatoy Pavel (Святой Павел, 'St. Paul')	Imperial Russian Navy	The ship was driven ashore 7 km (4.3 mi) north of the mouth of the Bolshaya. She was later refloated and repaired.
Svyatoy Zakhary (Святой Захарий, 'St. Zachary')	Imperial Russian Navy	The galiot was driven ashore and wrecked between the mouths of the ru:Kol and the ru:Pymta, Kamchatka, with the loss of sixteen lives. She was on a voyage from Okhotsk to Kamchatka.

=== 27 October ===
List of shipwrecks: 27 October 1766
Ship	State	Description
New Success	Great Britain	The ship was driven ashore at Penzance, Cornwall. She was on a voyage from Málaga, Spain to London.

=== Unknown date ===
List of shipwrecks: Unknown date 1766
Ship	State	Description
Diamond	Great Britain	The ship foundered. Her crew were rescued by John & Philip.
Friendship	Great Britain	The ship was driven ashore and wrecked near Cádiz, Spain. She was on a voyage from Newfoundland, British America to Naples, Kingdom of Sicily.
Grafton	Great Britain	The ship was lost on the Black Middens, in the North Sea off the coast of County Durham, She was on a voyage from London to South Shields, County Durham.
Industry	Great Britain	The ship was driven ashore near St. Lucar, Spain. She was on a voyage from London to Seville, Spain. She was later refloated and taken in to "Woolver".
Kingstton	Great Britain	The ship departed from the Clyde for Saint Kitts. No further trace, presumed foundered with the loss of all hands.
Mary	Great Britain	The ship ran aground in the River Avon and was wrecked. She was on a voyage from Bristol, Gloucestershire to Boston, Massachusetts, British America.
Regina Catharina	Grand Duchy of Tuscany	The ship was destroyed by fire at Livorno.
Rouble	Great Britain	The ship was driven ashore in Carmarthen Bay. She was on a voyage from New England, British America to London.
St. Juan Baptista	Spain	The ship was driven ashore and wrecked on the Île de Ré, France. She was on a voyage from St. Andero to La Rochelle, France.
Susannah	Great Britain	The ship was driven ashore and wrecked on the south coast of the Isle of Wight.
Sydenham	Great Britain	The ship was driven ashore and wrecked in the Thames Estuary 8 nautical miles (15 km) downstream of Gravesend, Kent. She was on a voyage from Jamaica to London.

== November ==
=== 17 November ===
List of shipwrecks: 17 November 1766
Ship	State	Description
Bishop	Great Britain	The ship was lost near Sidmouth, Devon with the loss of two of her crew. She was on a voyage from Rotterdam, Dutch Republic to Livorno, Grand Duchy of Tuscany.

=== 18 November ===
List of shipwrecks: 18 November 1766
Ship	State	Description
Boyne	Great Britain	The ship was driven ashore at Kirkcudbright. She was on a voyage from Virginia, British America to Whitehaven, Cumberland.
Grand Power of God	Spain	The ship was driven ashore and wrecked at Lyme, Dorset, Great Britain. She was on a voyage from Dunkirk, France to Cádiz and Tenerife, Canary Islands.

=== 28 November ===
List of shipwrecks: 28 November 1766
Ship	State	Description
William & Mary	Great Britain	The ship was lost near "Drenten" with the loss of all but three of her crew. She was on a voyage from Onega, Russia to Lancaster, Lancashire.

=== Unknown date ===
List of shipwrecks: Unknown date 1766
Ship	State	Description
Adventure	Great Britain	The ship was driven ashore at Youghall, County Cork, Ireland. She was on a voyage from Bristol, Gloucestershire to Boston, Massachusetts, British America.
Alexander & Ann	Great Britain	The ship was driven ashore at Aberdeen. She was on a voyage from London to Aberdeen.
Brothers	Great Britain	The ship was lost on the north coast of Scotland. She was on a voyage from Riga, Russia to Liverpool, Lancashire.
Charming Nancy	Ireland	The ship ran aground on the Arklow Bank, in the Irish Sea and was abandoned by her crew. She was on a voyage from Dublin to the West Indies.
Industry	Danzig	The ship was lost near Aldeburgh, Suffolk, Great Britain. She was on a voyage from Danzig to at Mediterranean port.
Maria	Great Britain	The ship was driven ashore near Kalmar, Sweden. She was on a voyage from Saint Petersburg, Russia to London.
Mary	Great Britain	The ship was lost at Figueira da Foz, Portugal. She was on a voyage from Newfoundland, British America to Figueira da Foz.
Princess Augusta	Russia	The ship was driven ashore at Hartlepool, County Durham, Great Britain.
Three Friends	Great Britain	The ship was lost on the Welsh coast. Her crew were rescued. She was on a voyage from Newfoundland to Bristol.
William and Mary	Great Britain	The ship was driven ashore and wrecked at Flamborough Head, Yorkshire. Her crew were rescued.

== December ==
=== 6 December ===
List of shipwrecks: 6 December 1766
Ship	State	Description
Hugh and James	Ireland	The ship was destroyed by fire at Philadelphia, Pennsylvania, British America.

=== 7 December ===
List of shipwrecks: 7 December 1766
Ship	State	Description
Young Dirk	Dutch Republic	The ship was driven ashore and wrecked at Holyhead, Anglesey, Great Britain. Her crew were rescued. She was on a voyage from Liverpool, Lancashire, Great Britain to Ostend.

=== 10 December ===
List of shipwrecks: 10 December 1766
Ship	State	Description
Charlotte	Great Britain	The ship was lost at Tarifa, Spain. Her crew survived. She was on a voyage from Amsterdam, Dutch Republic to Livorno, Grand Duchy of Tuscany.

=== 11 December ===
List of shipwrecks: 11 December 1766
Ship	State	Description
Angel	France	The ship was driven ashore and wrecked in Penzance Bay with the loss of all but one of her crew. She was on a voyage from Crozic to Saint-Malo.
Expedition	Great Britain	The ship was driven ashore in the Isles of Scilly. Her crew were rescued. She was on a voyage from Liverpool, Lancashire to London
Seahorse	Great Britain	The ship was lost in the Isles of Scilly. She was on a voyage from Zant, Greece to London.

=== 18 December ===
List of shipwrecks: 18 December 1766
Ship	State	Description
William	Ireland	The ship was lost near Truro, Cornwall, Great Britain with the loss of five of her crew. She was on a voyage from Cork to Havre de Grâce, France.

=== 28 December ===
List of shipwrecks: 28 December 1766
Ship	State	Description
Pompey	(Kingdom of Great Britain) British America	The brig was driven ashore and wrecked on Cape Lookout, North Carolina. Her crew were rescued. She was on a voyage from Philadelphia, Pennsylvania to North Carolina.

=== Unknown date ===
List of shipwrecks: Unknown date 1766
Ship	State	Description
Batchelor	Great Britain	The ship was wrecked off Sandwich, Kent. Her crew were rescued. She was on a voyage from London to Belfast, Ireland.
Cato	Great Britain	The ship sank in the North Sea off Hook of Holland, Dutch Republic with the loss of all hands. She was on a voyage from Altea, Spain to London.
Fortunate	Great Britain	The ship struck rocks and sank at Sunderland, County Durham. She was refloated and taken in to Sunderland. Fortunate was on a voyage from Sunderland to London.
Jenny	Ireland	The ship was lost near Londonderry with the loss of four of her crew. She was on a voyage from Onega, Russia to an Irish port.
Polly	Great Britain	The ship was lost at Lisbon, Portugal. She was on a voyage from Lisbon to Madeira.
Sally	Ireland	The ship was wrecked on the Goodwin Sands, Kent, Great Britain. Her crew were rescued. She was on a voyage from Norway to Dublin.

== Unknown date ==
List of shipwrecks: Unknown date 1766
Ship	State	Description
Abbot	Great Britain	The ship was lost at Jamaica. She was on a voyage from Jamaica to London.
Earl of Guildford	Great Britain	African slave trade: The ship was lost on the coast of Hispaniola. At least 236 slaves survived. She was on a voyage from Africa to Jamaica.
Elizabeth	Great Britain	The ship was lost on the American coast. She was on a voyage from the Grenades to the Piscataqua River.
Elizabeth	(Kingdom of Great Britain) British America	The ship was wrecked on Bermuda. She was on a voyage from New England to Antigua.
Elizabeth	Great Britain	The ship foundered in the Atlantic Ocean. Her crew were rescued by Planter (Great Britain). She was on a voyage from Dublin, Ireland to North Carolina, British America.
Ellis	Great Britain	The ship was lost at Egg-harbour, New Jersey, British America with the loss of two lives. She was on a voyage from London to Philadelphia, Pennsylvania, British America.
Enterprize	Great Britain	The ship foundered in the Atlantic OCean. Her crew were rescued by Mermaid (Great Britain). Enterprize was on a voyage from Senegal to London.
General Conway	Great Britain	The ship was wrecked on the Jordans, in the Gulf of Florida. Her crew were rescued.
George	Great Britain	The ship foundered in the Atlantic Ocean off the coast of Carolina, British America. She was on a voyage from Lisbon, Portugal to New York.
Hawke	Great Britain	The ship was lost in Chesapeake Bay. She was on a voyage from Maryland, British America to Cádiz, Spain.
Henbury	Great Britain	The ship was wrecked on the coast of Newfoundland, British America.
Johanna	Ireland	The snow sank in the Delaware River. She was on a voyage from Philadelphia to Newry, County Antrim.
Martin	Great Britain	African slave trade: The ship was wrecked on the Morant Keys with the loss of 424 lives. She was on a voyage from Sierra Leone to Jamaica.
Mary	Great Britain	The ship was lost on the "Grand Comanas". She was on a voyage from Jamaica to London.
Minehead	Great Britain	The ship was wrecked on Sable Island, Nova Scotia, British America with the loss of more than fourteen lives. She was on a voyage from Bristol, Gloucestershire to Boston, Massachusetts, British America.
Nancy	Great Britain	The ship was lost on the American coast with the loss of 23 of her crew. She was on a voyage from Bristol to Philadelphia.
Nelly	Great Britain	The ship was lost at St. Augustine. Her crew were rescued. She was on a voyage from Philadelphia to St. Augustine.
New Espagne	Spain	The ship was destroyed by fire at Veracruz, Viceroyalty of Peru.
Northern Lass	Great Britain	The ship foundered in the Bay of Honduras.
Pembroke	Great Britain	The ship was driven ashore at Lynn, Massachusetts, British America. She was on a voyage from Hull, Yorkshire to Boston, Massachusetts.
Pitt	Great Britain	The whaler was lost in ice off Greenland. Her crew were rescued by Sarah (Great Britain).
Pitt	Great Britain	The ship was driven ashore and wrecked on the Barbary Coast. Her crew were rescued and enslaved. She was on a voyage from Rotterdam, Dutch Republic to Angola.
Portland	Great Britain	The ship was lost in Manchionel Bay, Jamaica.
Rainbow	Great Britain	The ship was destroyed on the coast of Africa by an explosion.
Rogers	Great Britain	The ship was lost on the Middle Ground, in the Atlantic Ocean between Cape Charles and Cape Henry, Virginia, British America. Her crew were rescued. She was on a voyage from Liverpool, Lancashire to Virginia.
Speedwell	Great Britain	The ship was lost on the coast of Carolina. She was on a voyage from London to Carolina.
Superb	Great Britain	The ship was lost in the West Indies.
Susanna	Great Britain	The ship was wrecked on the coast of Newfoundland.
Swallow	Great Britain	The whaler was sunk by ice off the coast of Greenland.
Tartar	Great Britain	The ship foundered in the Atlantic Ocean 200 leagues (600 nautical miles (1,100 km)) off the Virginia Capes, British America. Her crew were rescued by Leveret (Great Britain). Tartar was on a voyage from London to Maryland.
Thomas and Elizabeth	Great Britain	The ship foundered in the Atlantic Ocean before 14 June.
Trimmer	Great Britain	African slave trade: The ship was taken over by the slaves and wrecked on the coast of Africa.
Two Brothers	Great Britain	The ship foundered in the Atlantic Ocean. She was on a voyage from the Piscataqua River to the Leeward Islands.
