= 1737 in South Africa =

- Decades
- See also: List of years in South Africa

The following lists events that happened during 1737 in South Africa.

== Incumbents ==
- Governor of the Cape Colony - Jan de la Fontaine
- Governor of the Cape Colony - Adriaan van Kervel
- Governor of the Cape Colony - Daniël van den Henghel

== Events ==
- After only three weeks of serving as the Governor of the Cape Colony, Adriaan van Kervel dies.
- Georg Schmidt, a Moravian missionary, receives permission from the VOC to establish a mission for landless Khoikhoi.
- Georg Schmidt sets up his mission at Zoetemelksvlei, a military outpost near Caledon, marking the start of Protestant missionary activity in South Africa.
