= 1760s in South Africa =

- 1740s 1750s « 1760s » 1770s 1780s
- List of years in South Africa

The following lists events that happened during the 1760s in South Africa.

== Events ==
=== 1760 ===
- trekboers Jansz Coetse, Klas Barends and others cross the Gariep River (now called the Orange River)

=== 1763 ===
- 11 September – The "La Fortune", a French man-of-war, is wrecked near Mossel Bay in the Cape Colony while on its way from Réunion

=== 1766 ===
- 112 slaves from Madagascar arrive in Cape Town after a slave uprising on board the slaver ship Meermin.

== Births ==
- 1 February 1761 – Christian Hendrik Persoon, mycologist, is born in the Cape Colony

== Deaths ==
- 1760 – Hendrik Swellengrebel, Governor of the Cape Colony, dies
