= 1739 in South Africa =

- Decades
- See also: List of years in South Africa

The following lists events that happened during 1739 in South Africa.

== Incumbents ==
Acting Governor of the Cape Colony - Daniël van den Henghel

Governor of the Cape Colony - Hendrik Swellengrebel

== Events ==
- The last Khoikhoi rebellion against the Dutch happens in the south-western Cape. It is suppressed, and the survivors become farm labourers.
- The Khoikhoi accuse Olifants River farmers of cattle theft. They are proven right, the cattle are returned, but the farmers defy their summons.
- San Bushmen raids in the north force farmers to flee. Acting governor Daniël van den Henghel raises a commando, and offers amnesty to participants.
- Etienne Barbier and his men refuse to pay taxes and accuse the government of tyranny, exploiting the governor's amnesty. Barbier remains in hiding but is eventually caught.
- Etienne Barbier is executed by drawn and quarter as South Africa's first rebel, his remains are displayed as a warning.
- Hendrik Swellengrebel becomes the first Cape-born Governor of the Cape Colony.
