= Noodt =

Noodt is a surname. Notable people with the surname include:

- Gerhard Noodt (1647–1725), Dutch jurist
- Pieter Gysbert Noodt (1581–1729), Dutch governor of the Cape of Good Hope
