= 1750s in South Africa =

- 1730s 1740s « 1750s » 1760s 1770s
- List of years in South Africa

The following lists events that happened during the 1750s in South Africa.

== Events ==
=== 1750 ===
- 30 March - Ryk Tulbagh is appointed Governor of the Cape Colony

=== 1754 ===
- A population count shows that there were 5,510 Europeans and 6,279 slaves in the Cape Colony

=== 1755 ===
- The foundation stone of Old Town House in Cape Town is laid
- 1 May - A Smallpox epidemic breaks out at the Cape Colony. A total of 2,372 people die
