= 1730s in South Africa =

- 1710s 1720s « 1730s » 1740s 1750s
- List of years in South Africa

The following lists events that happened during the 1730s in South Africa. Jan de la Fontaine continues as Governor of the Cape Colony.

== Events ==
=== 1730 ===
- The Dutch East India Company imports slaves from Mozambique and Zanzibar
- The first trekboers reach the George area, trek inland into Langkloof
- 8 March - Jan de la Fontaine becomes Governor of the Cape Colony
- 8 April - The first Jewish congregation consecrates their synagogue
- Phalo becomes ruler of the AmaXhosa, but rivalry between his sons ended up causing political rifts.
- A Dutch commando kills six Khoi-San, captures a woman and three children. This is the first recorded instance of indigenous women and children taken as war captives for forced labor.
- The VOC abandons Delagoa Bay after its failed occupation, and 103 soldiers return to the Cape Colony.
- The French language disappears from the Huguenot immigrants within two generations, an unprecedented event in French emigration history.
- The Little Karoo valley is reached by the Dutch South Africans.
- The economic fortunes and profits of the VOC start to decline.Over the next 50 years, 4 million guilders is drawn from the Asia capital stock, a liquid capital in Europe decreases by 20 million guilders during the same period.

=== 1732 ===
- The Trek Boers, the first Dutch farmers, settled along the Olifants River

=== 1733 ===
- Matthias Lotter, master Gold and Silver Smith arrives at the Cape.

=== 1734 ===
- Jan de la Fontaine, Governor of the Cape, claims Mossel Bay for the Dutch East India Company and the Great Brak River is proclaimed the eastern boundary of Cape
- The VOC establishes an administrative post at Rietvlei.
- VOC outposts are established at Riviersonderend and St Helena Bay.
- The Great Brak River is declared the eastern boundary of the Cape Colony.
- Jan de la Fontaine colonizes Mossel Bay by erecting a stone beacon with the VOC and Dutch Republic coats of arms.
- Jan Smiesing, a former slave and schoolteacher, dies.

=== 1736 ===
- 14 November Adriaan van Kervel is appointed Governor of the Cape
- Phalo becomes King of the Xhosa Nation

=== 1737 ===
- 21 May - Nine ships are wrecked in a gale in Table Bay with a loss of 208 lives
- 9 July - George Schmidt, the first Protestant missionary (Moravian Brethren) in southern Africa, arrives at the Cape
- 20 September - Daniël van den Henghel is appointed acting Governor of the Cape
- 18 December - The first Moravian mission station in South Africa is established in Genadendal near present-day Caledon by George Schmidt, "The Apostle of the Hottentots"

=== 1739 ===
- 1 March - Etienne Barbier's insurrection at Paarl
- 1 April Hendrik Swellengrebel becomes the first South African-born governor when he is appointed Governor of the Cape

== Deaths ==
- 1733 - Willem Adriaan van der Stel, Governor of the Cape, dies
- 1737 - Adriaan van Kervel, Governor of the Cape, dies

== Bibliography ==
See Years in South Africa for further sources.
