= 1770s in South Africa =

- 1750s 1760s « 1770s » 1780s 1790s
- List of years in South Africa

The following lists events that happened during the 1770s in South Africa.

== Events ==
=== 1772 ===
- 13 January - The Prince Edward Islands are re-discovered by the French explorer Marc-Joseph Marion du Fresne, and named them Terre de l'Espérance (Marion) and Ile de la Caverne (Pr. Edward)

=== 1778 ===
- The Cape Colony boundary is extended to Buffels, Zak and Fish Rivers
- Hendrik Jacob Wikar and Robert Jacob Gordon meet Khoikhoi, Geisiqua and Tswana tribes along lower and middle Gariep which Gordon names Orange River in honour of the Netherlands Stadtholder
- 6 February - France formally recognises the United States as a nation by signing a treaty of Friendship and Trade. An undeclared war with Britain soon erupted
- 27 July - French and British navies clash just off the coast of France
- 30 December - Britain captures the port of St. Lucia in the Caribbean Sea
- British forces capture Pondicherry in the Bay of Bengal from the French, later recaptured
- The Dutch port of St Eustatius in the West Indies became the world's busiest port handling the majority of supplies and arms bound for the United States

=== 1779 ===
- Xhosas clash with the settlers moving north, at the Fish River starting the first of nine Cape Frontier Wars over the next 100 years. Also known as Africa's 100 Years War.
- 12 April - Spain joins with France and America in the war against Britain

== Births ==
- 17 August 1777 - Anna Maria Truter, botanical artist and wife of Sir John Barrow, 1st Baronet, is born in Cape Town

== Deaths ==
- 1771 - Ryk Tulbagh, Governor of the Cape dies
