= Meermin slave mutiny =

1766 revolt on a slave ship

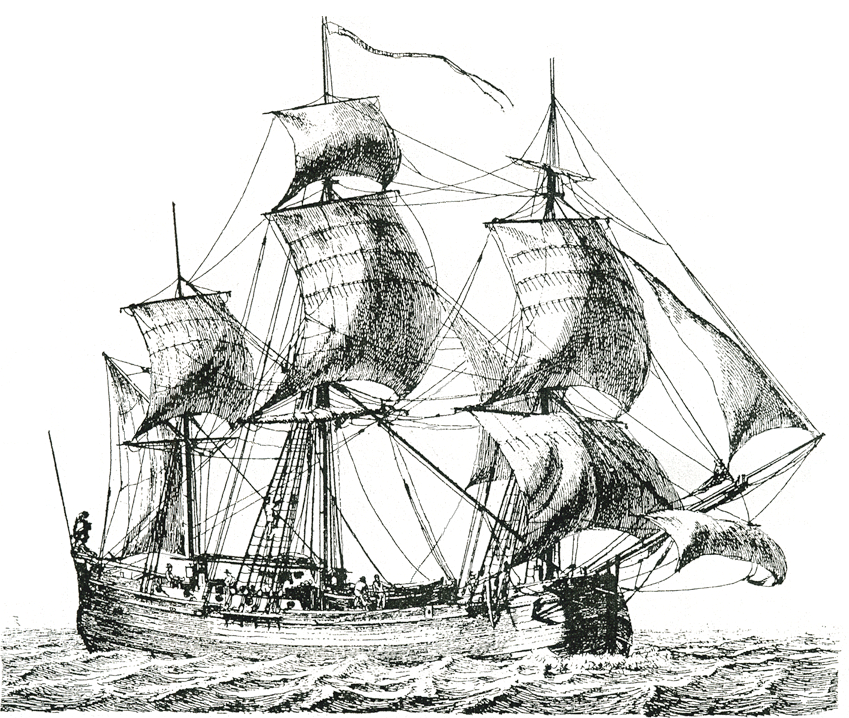
An 18th-century Dutch hoeker similar to Meermin

A slave mutiny on Meermin, one of the Dutch East India Company's fleet of slave ships, took place in February 1766 and lasted for three weeks. Her final voyage was cut short by the mutiny of the Malagasy captives onboard, who had been sold to Dutch East India Company officials on Madagascar to be enslaved by the company in its Cape Colony in southern Africa. During the mutiny half the ship's crew and almost 30 Malagasy captives died.

Meermin set sail from Madagascar on 20 January 1766, heading to the Cape Colony. Two days into the trip, Johann Godfried Krause, the ship's chief merchant, persuaded the captain, Gerrit Cristoffel Muller, to release the Malagasy slaves from their shackles and thus avoid attrition by death and disease in their overcrowded living conditions. The Malagasy were put to working the ship and entertaining the crew. In mid-February, Krause ordered the Malagasy to clean some Madagascan weapons, which they used to seize the ship in an attempt to regain their freedom; Krause was among the first of the crew to be killed, and Muller was stabbed three times but survived.

The crew negotiated a truce, under the terms of which the Malagasy undertook to spare the lives of the surviving crew members. In exchange, it was agreed that Meermin would return to Madagascar, where the Malagasy would be released. Gambling on the Malagasy's ignorance of navigation, the wounded Muller instead ordered his crew to head for the coast of southern Africa. After making landfall at Struisbaai in the Cape Colony, which the Malagasy were assured was their homeland, 50 to 70 of them went ashore. Their intention was to signal to the others still on board Meermin if it was safe for them to follow, but the shore party soon found themselves confronted by a militia of farmers formed in response to Meermin's arrival; the farmers had understood that as the ship was flying no flags, it was in distress.

Meermin's crew, now led by Krause's assistant Olof Leij, managed to communicate with the militia on shore by means of messages in bottles, and persuaded them to light the signal fires for which the Malagasy still on board were waiting. On seeing the fires, the Malagasy cut the ship's anchor cable and allowed the ship to drift towards the shore, after which she ran aground on an offshore sandbank. The Malagasy could then see the militia on the shore preparing to come to the ship's assistance, and realised that their situation was hopeless; they surrendered and were once again enslaved. Muller, the ship's mate Daniel Carel Gulik and Krause's assistant Olof Leij were tried in the Dutch East India Company's Council of Justice; all three were fired from the company, while Muller and Gulik were also stripped of their rank and wages. The enslaved Malagasy were not tried, but the two surviving leaders of the mutiny, named in Dutch East India Company records as Massavana and Koesaaij, (Note: The names Massavana and Koesaaij are 18th-century Dutch phonetic approximations, rather than necessarily the actual names borne by the men concerned, which are unknown.) were sent to Robben Island for observation, where Massavana died three years later; Koesaaij survived there for another 20 years. In 2004, a search was begun for the wreck of Meermin.

== Voyage ==
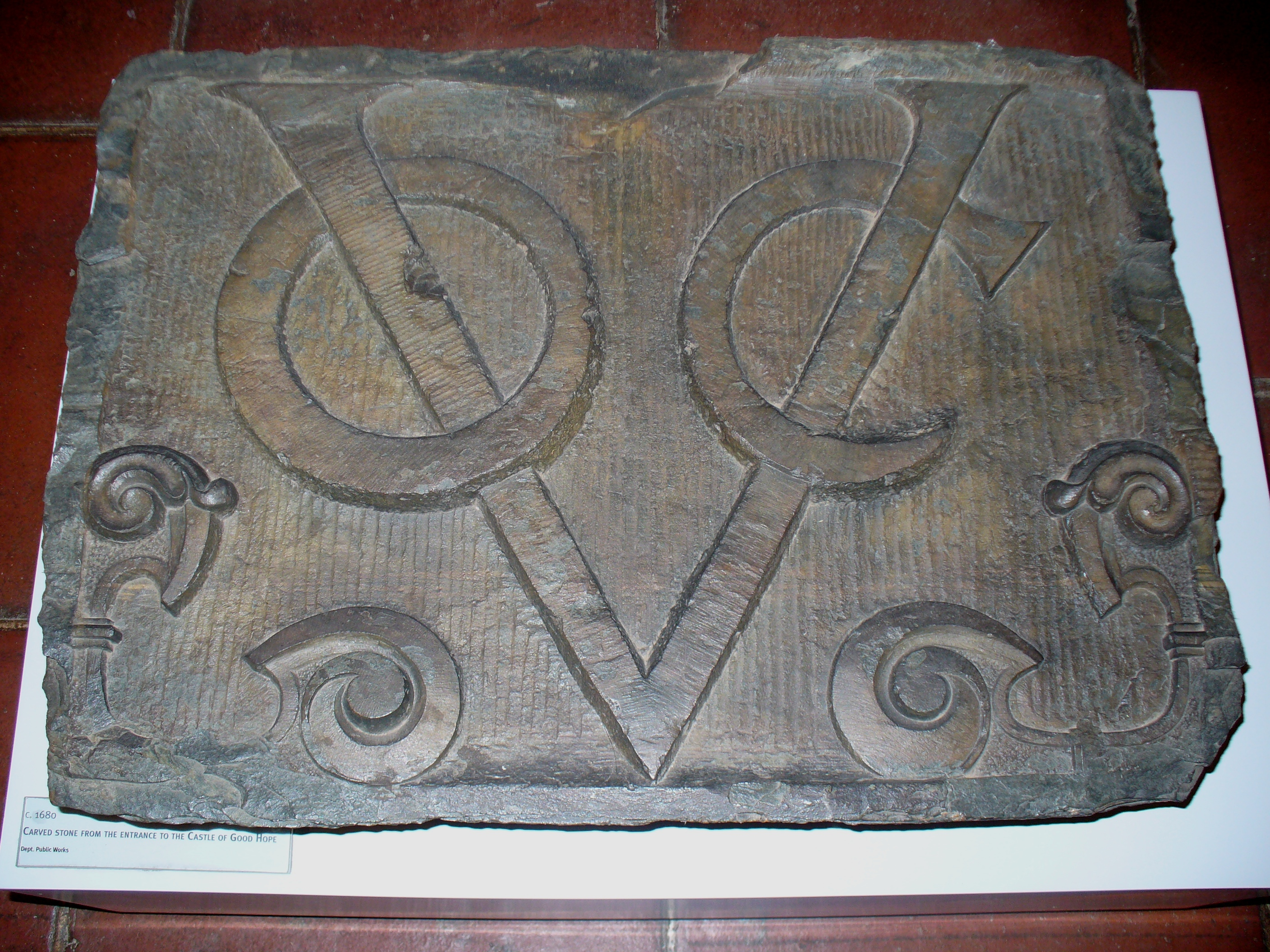
Carved stone from the Castle of Good Hope, showing the logo of the VOC

Between 1658 and 1795, the Dutch East India Company (VOC) purchased and transported approximately 63,000 slaves to the Dutch Cape Colony in southern Africa, now part of South Africa. In Dutch, the company's name was Vereenigde Oost-Indische Compagnie: abbreviated as VOC, the company's initials were used in a monogram which appeared on company materials as a logo. Meermin was a 480-ton square rigged ship of the Dutch hoeker-type, with three masts, which was built in 1759 in the Dutch port of Amsterdam for the VOC's African trade. (Note: Different sources describe Meermin as a two-masted or single-masted ship of 450 tons, but, having examined the ship's plans, archaeologist Jaco Boshoff confirmed that she was one of the rarer, and heavier, oak-built three-masters. The ship's plans are held at the Nederlands Scheepvaartmuseum in Amsterdam, and are available to view online in low resolution. The ship type "hoeker" was named after its original purpose, using baited hooks to catch fish. Distinctive features of a hoeker are the "apple cheeks" of the bow. This ship's name, "Meermin", is Dutch for "mermaid".) From December 1765 she was working the coastline of Madagascar, under Captain Gerrit Muller and a crew of 56, taking Malagasy men, women and children to be enslaved in the Cape Colony. (Note: The sources use various 18th-century Dutch terms, not all of which are easily translated into modern English: Captain Muller's rank is given as "Gesaghebber"; Krause's position is given as "Commies", for "supercargo"; Harmen Koops' position is given as both "Koksmaat" and "Hofmeester" (literally "yard-master"), for "cook's mate" and "steward"; Bender, Albert and Gulik's rank was "Onderstuurman", or "ship's mate" (the "ship's mate" ("Stuurman", or "steer-man") ranks included navigators and helmsmen: normally VOC ships also carried an "Opperstuurman", or "chief mate", but none is identified on the Meermin); Leij is described as both "Adsistent", in this context "junior merchant", and "Commies"; Laurens Pieters was "Bootsman", or bosun"; de Leeuw was "Bottelier", or butler; Le Sueur was a "Landdrost", or "magistrate"; Stuurlieden were maritime pilots; a "scheeps jongjete" was a cabin boy.) Carrying about 140 Malagasy, she set sail from "Betisboka Bay" on the north-western coast of Madagascar on 20 January 1766. (Note: The exact number of Malagasy on Meermin is unknown, since officers on VOC ships carried out their own, undeclared trade, to the extent that this is how "most slaves actually got to the Cape [Colony]"; it was also a cause of severe over-crowding on slave ships. Some of the Malagasy gave their number as 150. The average age of slaves taken to Cape Town was 16. "Betisboka Bay" may be a misspelt conflation of "Betsiboka River" and "Bombetoka Bay".)

=== Mutiny ===
In 1766 supercargo Johann Krause was probably the most experienced merchant trading in Madagascar, although he had been "guilty of an earlier indiscretion in 1760", on the VOC ship Neptunus. To avoid the loss of profit caused by enslaved Malagasy dying while at sea, Krause convinced Captain Muller, who was in his first command and was unwell at the time, to unshackle some of them and make them work on deck. Disease was spreading among the Malagasy in the unsanitary conditions below deck, and the ship's surgeon had reported that, while there were no suitable medicines on board, disease was spreading to the crew. Consequently, two days after the ship had left Madagascar, the crew moved a "large party of [Malagasy]" from confinement to make them work, the men made to assist the crew and the women made to provide entertainment by dancing and singing. Massavana and some others were set to controlling and taking care of the sails, which has been described as "unheard of, and certainly against all [VOC] regulations". Allowing slaves into secure areas on deck was common practice on most European vessels, and VOC regulations did permit them to be released onto the deck from time to time, under careful supervision. But the chief concern was that they might jump overboard to escape, rather than that they might mutiny, despite a mutiny by the slaves occurring on the VOC ship Drie Heuvelen in 1753. That mutiny was quickly suppressed, but clearly it could happen again, making Captain Muller's agreement to the kind of release that occurred on Meermin "appear all the more foolish".

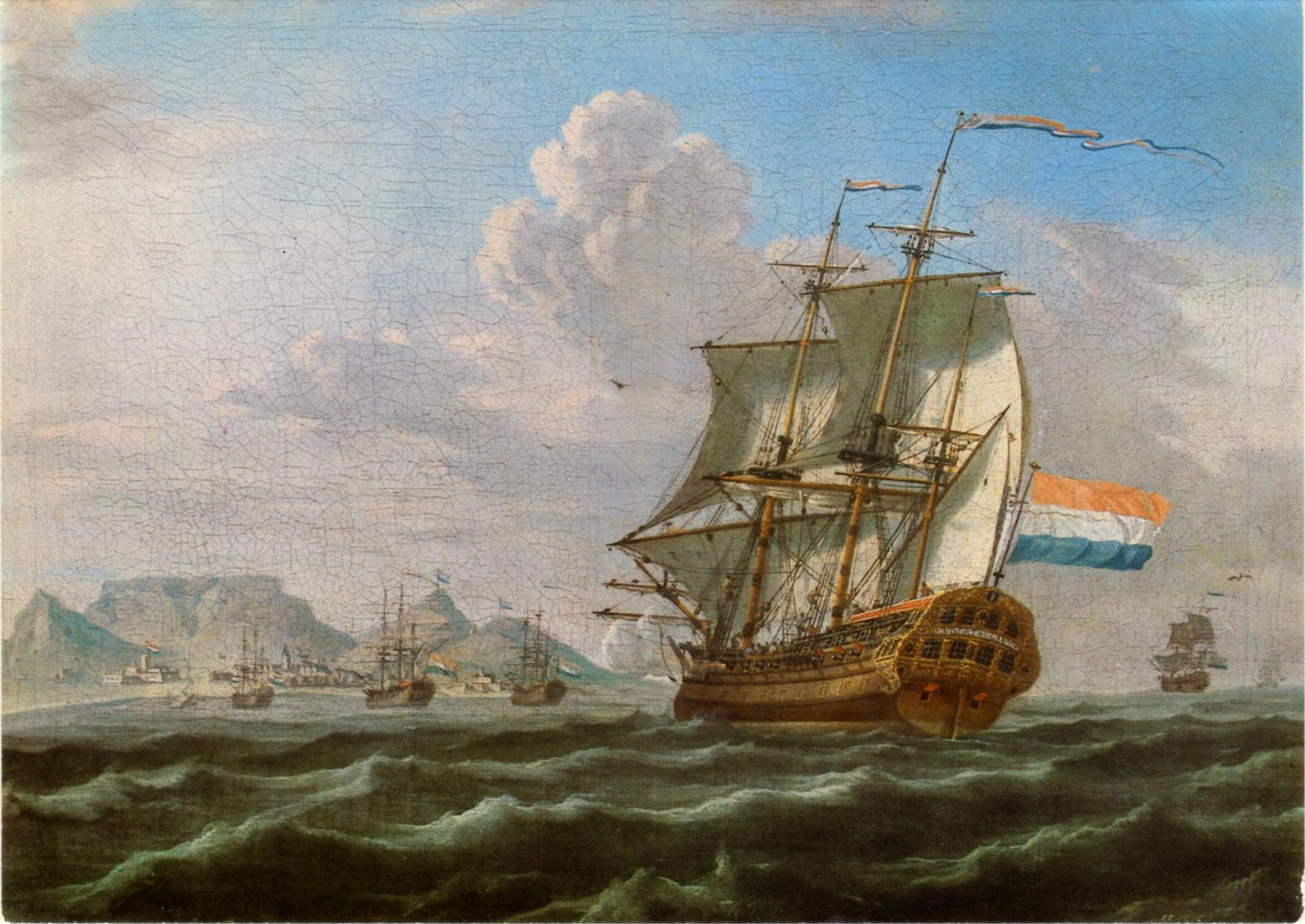
A square rigged VOC ship approaching the Cape Colony, with Table Mountain in the background, 1762

According to crew member Harmen Koops, on 18 February 1766, Krause ordered him to bring on deck some assegais (a type of African spear) and some swords for the Malagasy to clean. The assegais had been acquired on Madagascar along with the Malagasy, some of whom were experienced in the use of this weapon. (Note: The Malagasy "were provided with lethal weapons, the use of which they were highly familiar with".) Krause believed himself to be intellectually superior to the Malagasy, and is reported to have laughed when issuing his order, saying he was sure that others would doubt his wisdom; having set the task, he went below deck for a meal. When the Malagasy had cleaned the weapons and were ordered to return them, they attacked the ship's crew, killing all who were left on deck, including Krause, who had returned when the attack began. (Note: According to Massavana, they were given six assegais to clean, but attacked the crew with only four.) Also killed in this fight were two of the ship's mates, (Note: Several ranks of deck officer on merchant ships are known as "mates", e.g. Chief Mate, Second Mate and Third Mate.) Bender and Albert, leaving only Daniel Carel Gulik surviving of that rank. Some of the surviving crew climbed into the rigging, and others, including Gulik, Koops, Jan de Leeuw, and Krause's assistant Olof Leij, withdrew to the Constapelskamer, or gunroom, which was below decks at the stern of the ship, near the rudder. Captain Muller, who stated that he had been "gazing out over the sea" at the time of the attack, was taken by surprise and stabbed three times by Massavana. Muller escaped to his cabin and soon climbed down from a window, via the rudder, to join the others in the gunroom. Crew member Rijk Meyer, who had been thrown overboard with others from the rigging, managed to swim around the ship to a rope hanging from the gunroom window, and was pulled to safety by his shipmates. Although the crew who had climbed into the rigging threatened the Malagasy from the fore-mast with hand grenades, "only those that reached the safety of the barricaded [gunroom] ... escaped a brutal death." With Krause dead and Muller wounded, Olof Leij was left in charge of the remaining crew below deck. (Note: The shift in leadership of the crew from Muller to Leij has been ascribed to factors additional to Muller's wounding and Krause's death: "[Muller] was not in a fit frame of mind or body … [and] while Muller certainly stands out as a captain whose authoritative ineptitude created an atmosphere conducive to mutinous violence … one can reasonably assume that [Krause's] understanding of the [Malagasy's] mentality was minimal, and that he must have been a man of limited imagination … [Leij] had been employed in the capacity of slave purchase and management. He would thus have been already personally acquainted with the [Malagasy, and] he would have been the most capable candidate in the eyes of the [crew] to undertake complex … negotiations of this nature… The only possibility for obtaining life and liberty were thus secured in his hands".)

The mutiny began under the de facto leadership of three men: the primary leader's name is unknown, but the names of the others were recorded as Massavana and Koesaaij. Massavana, a man of 26, had been enslaved by "the king of Toulier", now Toliara, through an elaborate deception. Although Krause had presented the Malagasy with an opportunity to mutiny by allowing them on deck and handing them familiar weapons, the mutiny had been premeditated and organised by the Malagasy, who intended to kill all Europeans on board the ship, and to return to Madagascar. According to Massavana, the Malagasy had "planned for a long time to become masters of the ship [and their] aim was to go back to [their] own country". It may be that the Malagasy had originally intended to sail the ship themselves, as did the slaves involved in a later mutiny on the VOC ship De Zon, in 1775; (Note: The Malagasy on the Meermin had some experience of working the ship: in his testimony to the VOC Council of Justice, Massavana is reported to have said, "We were ordered to work on the ship. We often pulled ropes. We worked with the sails.") but they found that they could not control the ship, and the Meermin drifted for three days.

=== Truces and betrayal ===
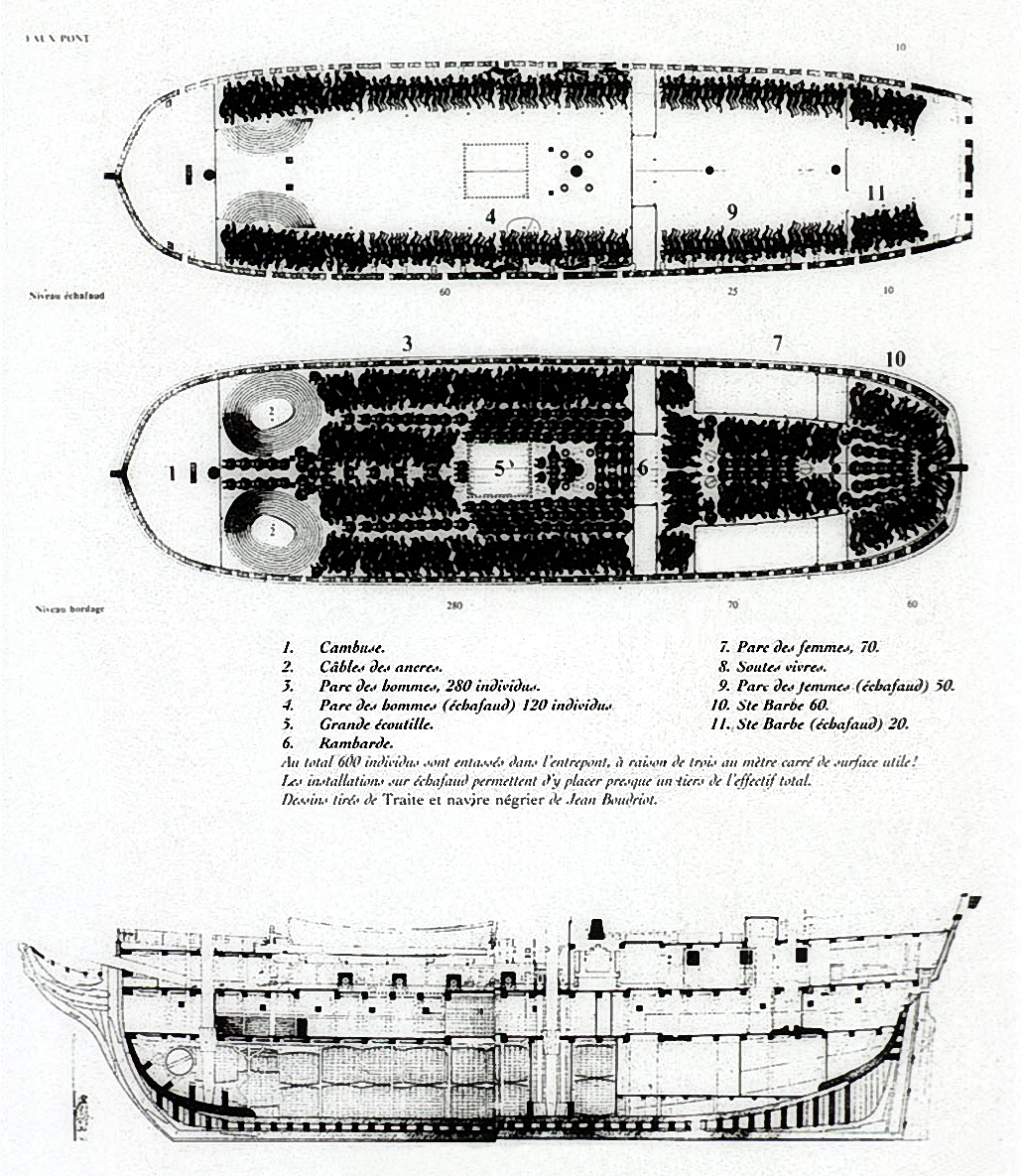
Conditions on a slave ship

The crew members on the fore-mast initially reached an agreement with the Malagasy: the crew's lives were to be spared on condition that they sailed Meermin back to Madagascar; but this truce broke down; the crewmen were killed and their bodies thrown overboard. The crew in the gunroom were short of food and drink; Muller decided that they should attempt to regain control of Meermin. (Note: The crew members in the gunroom "were forced to subsist on raw bacon and potatoes and a cask of arak".) Neither Muller nor Gulik took part in the attack, as both were wounded; command was instead transferred to boatswain Laurens Pieters; twelve crewmen armed themselves and exited the gunroom shooting as they went. Pieters and another man were surprised and killed as they stepped on deck; the rest retreated back to the gunroom, where another crewman, who had been severely wounded, later died.

On the third day, the survivors set off a small explosion just outside it, using gunpowder, in which Gulik was injured again. Their hope was to frighten the Malagasy into submission, and a Malagasy woman who had been taken hostage was instructed to tell the other Malagasy that, if they did not surrender, the crew would blow up the ship. The Malagasy correctly pointed out that doing so would kill the crew as well, and again demanded that they be returned to Madagascar. Leij agreed, but Captain Muller ordered the crew to sail the ship towards Cape Agulhas, the southernmost point of Africa. Muller's assessment was that the Malagasy had little skill in seafaring and navigation and therefore would be unlikely to notice the deception, which proved to be the case. After three or four days' sailing they sighted land, the VOC settlement of Struisbaai.

The leader of the mutineers was by now suspicious. The orientation of the sunrise, and birds the Malagasy had seen, did not match those of his homeland, which he pointed out to Leij, who spoke enough of the Malagasy language to tell him that the land they saw was a different part of Madagascar. They dropped anchor when the ship was "a mile (1.6 km) offshore", and the mutiny's leader, with more than 50 – perhaps as many as 70 – other Malagasy men and women set off for the shore in the ship's longboat and pinnace. They had promised their fellow Malagasy that they would light signal fires on the beach and send the boats back if it was safe for them to follow.

Dutch farmers had spotted the ship, and observing that she was flying no flags understood that to be a distress signal. On coming ashore, the Malagasy reached a farm belonging to Dutchman Matthijs Rostok and discovered that they had been deceived by the ship's crew. Local officials had ordered local Dutch farmers and burghers to form an impromptu militia; (Note: Reference by modern sources to these local Dutchmen as "burghers", or citizens, is somewhat anachronous, since the Cape Colony was VOC property at the time: a "burger" (sic) was "a vrijburger ["free citizen"], a person not in the service of the [VOC], who, with the consent of the [VOC], made use of company land. Usually ex-servants; in the 19th century [the term includes] descendants of these vrijburgers, in particular 'Dutch burghers'." Beginning in the 17th century, "so-called free burghers [were required to be farmers and] had to sow and plant what [the commander of the Cape Colony] prescribed ... They could sell their produce only to the [VOC], and it alone would set the prices ... [With] the reservation that this must always take place after communication with the government ... [the] first free burghers at the Cape received in full ownership as much land as they could bring under cultivation within three years ... [In the 1670s the VOC] decided to grant ownership of [loaned land] to the tenant farmers ... [but if VOC conditions were not met] their property rights would lapse ... [The VOC] still considered itself master of the grazing lands [and] temporary [concessions] could be arbitrarily revoked at any time ... [By] the end of the eighteenth century the vast majority of loan farm tenants were people who possessed no freehold land." The militia is described in the source as a "commando".) some of the Malagasy were shot dead and some were imprisoned at Wessels Wesselsen's property close by. On 27 February, a local official named Hentz wrote a letter describing events to Johannes Le Sueur, the VOC magistrate for Stellenbosch, about 146 kilometres (91 mi) to the north-west. Two days later Le Sueur arrived in Soetendaal's Valleij, a little more than six kilometres (4 mi) north-west of Struisbaai, and "installed himself" in the home of farmer Barend Geldenhuijs. Le Sueur then went to Wesselsen's property, where he interrogated 18 Malagasy men in an attempt to assess the situation on board Meermin.

On 3 March, he went from there to Matthijs Rostok's farm and began corresponding with the VOC's Cape Colony government, based in what is now the city of Cape Town. A crew member who had come ashore with the Malagasy and subsequently escaped was taken to Le Sueur, who sent him to report in person to the authorities at Cape Town. Meanwhile, local farmers and burghers were recapturing Malagasy in small groups. The authorities at Cape Town sent two hoekers, Neptunus and Snelheid, with a party of soldiers under two corporals and a sergeant, to assist in retaking Meermin, but the ships did not arrive until the action was over. (Note: The VOC ship Neptunus, which was sent to assist in 1766, was presumably the same ship with which supercargo Krause had been involved in 1760; the VOC owned only one ship of this name from 1757 to 1775.)

=== Final stages ===
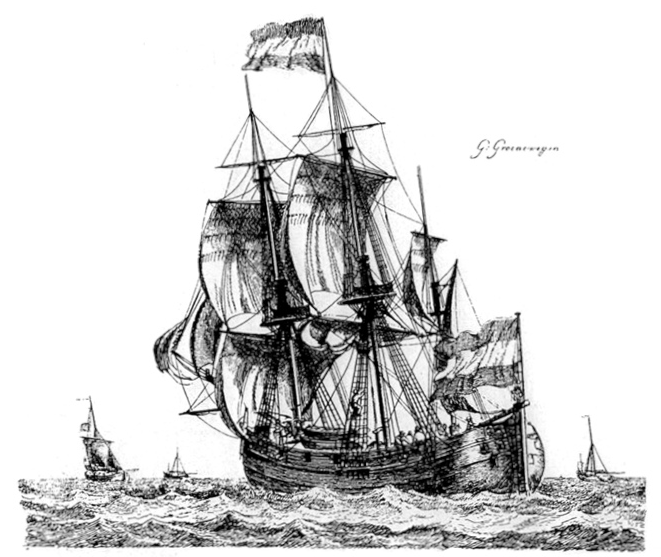
The three-masted hoeker Groenewegen in 1789

About 90 Malagasy remained on the ship throughout the following week, waiting for the promised signal fires and growing increasingly impatient. Some of the mutineers decided to build a raft to carry them to the shore in an effort to establish exactly where they were. In a stroke of luck for the crew, the mutineers encountered a black shepherd, but he ran away before they could speak to him; believing that they were indeed in Madagascar, they returned to the ship. Meanwhile, the surviving crew members were becoming desperate; having observed that the ocean current was setting onshore, and knowing of the arrangements for signal fires, they wrote messages asking for Dutchmen on land to light three fires on the shore to deceive the Malagasy on the ship into believing they were close to home rather than in a "Christian country", and to guard them "should the ship run aground".

Convinced they would be killed if the Malagasy discovered the truth while still on board ship, the crew sealed their messages in bottles and dropped them into the onshore current. The VOC authorities in Cape Town had sent their chief ship's carpenter, Philip van den Berg, with two other ship's carpenters, two pilots, a quartermaster and 20 sailors overland. Carpenters were needed since neither of Meermin's boats, now onshore, could be used: one was buried in the sand, and the other was in need of repair. The party from Cape Town had arrived by 6 March, and, while Johannes Le Sueur was overseeing the carpenters' examination of Meermin's boats, he was handed a bottle containing a message signed by Jan de Leeuw. A second bottle, containing a message signed by Olof Leij, was also found and handed to Le Sueur, and the fires were lit on 7 March. One of the messages is preserved in the Cape Archives Repository.

Extract from message

Although we trust in the Lord to save us we kindly request the finder of this letter to light three fires on the beach and stand guard at these behind the dunes, should the ship run aground, so that the slaves may not become aware that this is a Christian country. They will certainly kill us if they establish that we made them believe that this is their country.

— Olof Leij

The Malagasy on the ship, seeing the signal fires, cut the anchor cable, allowing Meermin to drift shorewards, where she grounded on a sandbank. Crew member Rijk Meyer, who had earlier been thrown overboard and swum around the ship to the safety of the gunroom, now swam from the ship to the shore and was brought to Le Sueur. He informed Le Sueur that the Malagasy on the ship had told him to find out whether the earlier landing party was there, but that he had secretly arranged with the other crew members that, if help was available on shore, he would signal back to the ship by waving a handkerchief above his head. Six Malagasy and another crew member also left Meermin in a canoe, but a unit of the militia immediately surrounded the party when they landed. One Malagasy was shot dead and three others taken prisoner; the dead Malagasy was later identified by one of the ship's crew as the mutiny's overall ringleader, but his name was not recorded. Of the remaining two, one swam away and the other was believed either to have swum back to the ship or drowned in the attempt. Enraged by the crew's deception, the Malagasy still on Meermin launched an attack on the crew which lasted for three hours, but the crew were able to defend themselves.

On 9 March the ship's carpenters from Cape Town completed repairs to one of Meermin's two boats, described as a schuit. The Malagasy saw how close they were to defeat; the ship was grounded and a force of Dutchmen on shore was preparing to go to the ship's assistance. Olof Leij persuaded the remaining Malagasy to surrender; he promised that, if they allowed themselves to be enslaved again, they would not be punished further. A second canoe, manned by Leij, Daniel Gulik and a ship's boy, went ashore to deliver news of the surrender.

The weather had begun to deteriorate, and it was decided that the schuit was not strong enough to bring the remaining Malagasy ashore. One end of a rope was anchored to the shore, and at low tide volunteers from the Dutch group on shore swam out to Meermin, bringing the other end of the rope with them and handing it up to the crew on the ship. The crew then helped the remaining fifty-three Malagasy climb down to the Dutch volunteers, who helped them to shore, some carrying children on their backs. The Dutch built a fire to warm the Malagasy after their immersion in the water, and fed them; three wagons took them to Cape Town on 12 March. Of the 140 or so Malagasy who had been taken on the ship originally, 112 reached the Cape Colony.

== Aftermath ==
The VOC authorities salvaged as much as possible from the beached Meermin. They recovered nearly 300 firearms, gunpowder and musket balls, compasses and five bayonets; they auctioned cables, ropes and other items from the ship on the shore. As it was judged too expensive to salvage the hull, Meermin was ultimately left to break up where she grounded.

On 30 October 1766 the VOC's Council of Justice found Captain Muller and the surviving ship's mate, Daniel Carel Gulik, guilty of culpable negligence and sentenced them to demotion and dismissal from the company; they lost their rank and their pay was docked. They were also ordered to pay the costs of the case and were sent home to Amsterdam, having to work their passage; Muller was banned from the Cape Colony and was banned for life from working for the VOC. Olof Leij was also dismissed from the VOC. The burghers of Struisbaai were considered to have played an "exemplary role" in assisting Le Sueur's efforts to terminate the mutiny.

Other rulings made in this case represented a "huge step in the recognition of oppressed people [such as slaves] as free-thinking individuals". The VOC's normal punishment for a slave who attacked an owner or overseer was "death by impalement", but none of the Malagasy were tried. For lack of sufficient evidence it was decided that the remaining mutiny leaders Massavana and Koesaaij should be "put on [Robben Island] until further instructions". The purpose of this was for observation of their behaviour, in the hope that Massavana and Koesaaij might shed further light on how the mutiny had arisen. Massavana died on Robben Island on 20 December 1769; Koesaaij survived there for another 20 years.

== Archaeology ==
On 24 September 1998 – South Africa's Heritage Day – the building housing the South Africa Cultural History Museum, a branch of Iziko Museums, was renamed the Old Slave Lodge, commemorating its accommodation of about 9,000 government-owned slaves between the 17th and early 19th centuries. (Note: The building also accommodated convicted criminals and the mentally ill; it was modified to serve as government offices in 1810.) In 2004 Iziko Museums started a maritime archaeology project, associated with the Old Slave Lodge museum, to find and salvage the wreck of Meermin; supporting historical and archaeological research was also commissioned, funded by the South African National Lottery.

Jaco Boshoff of Iziko Museums, who is in charge of the research, retrieved Meermin's plans from the Netherlands to help identify this wreck among the numerous ships reputed to have run aground in the Struisbaai area. In 2011 the Iziko Museums' travelling exhibition Finding Meermin included updates on the progress of Jaco Boshoff's work with the archaeological research team, but, as of 2013, the search for the Meermin continues.
