= 1780s in South Africa =

- 1760s 1770s « 1780s » 1790s 1800
- List of years in South Africa

The following lists events that happened during the 1780s in South Africa.

== Events ==
=== 1780 ===
- The Fish River is made the eastern boundary of the Cape Colony
- July - The Sultan of Mysore, India declares war on the British
- October - Joachim van Plettenberg, Governor of the Dutch Cape Colony appoints Adriaan van Jaarsveld, to be field commandant over the eastern front.
- 16 December - The Netherlands joins the League of Armed Neutrality that is formed by Catherine the Great of Russia to protest British interference with the shipping of neutral nations during the war. Russia, Sweden, Prussia, Denmark, Austria, Portugal and Italy all join
- 20 December - Britain declares war on the Netherlands
- French troops arrive at the Cape Colony to guard it against the English

=== 1781 ===
- 3 February - Scottish forces captured St Eustatius and neutralises all other Dutch outlets in the West Indies and in Surinam. French and German forces later recaptured the island for the Spanish.
- July - Field Commandant Adriaan van Jaarsveld declares the Zuurveld, a district between the Sundays and the Great Fish Rivers clear of the Xhosa tribes hereby ending the First Cape Frontier War
- 5 August - The Dutch fleet clash with the British Fleet at Dogger Bank in the English Channel
- 19 October - American and French soldiers and French naval forces force the surrender of Lord Cornwallis at Yorktown, Virginia, ending the American War of Independence

=== 1782 ===
- April - François Le Vaillant, French explorer, collector and ornithologist, arrives in the Cape Colony and travels until 1785
- 30 April - The paper rix dollars is issued for the first time in the Cape
- Grosvenor, wreck, Pondoland coast of South Africa
- British forces capture the French outpost of Cuddalore in the Indian Ocean, later recaptured
- The Dutch port of Trincomalee on Ceylon is captured by the British, later recaptured back by the French

=== 1783 ===
- 3 September - The Treaty of Paris is signed ending the war. The Dutch have lost the most from the war

=== 1785 ===
- 14 February - Cornelis Jacob van de Graaff is appointed Governor of the Cape
- 3 May - The Dutch East India Company ship, the Brederode, carrying a cargo of porcelain, tin and spices, runs aground near Cape Agulhas

=== 1786 ===
- The Dutch East India Company established a magistracy at Graaff Reinet

=== 1787 ===
- The Dutch East India Company passed a law subjecting the nomadic Khoikhoi in the colony to certain restrictions

=== 1789 ===
- The start of the French Revolution
- The Dutch East India Company, filled with corruption, becomes financially unstable
- Merino sheep is imported from the Netherlands
- Xhosa tribes started moving back into the Zuurveld, a district between the Sundays and the Great Fish Rivers and clashing with the frontiersmen which is known as the start of the Second Cape Frontier War.

== Births ==
- 12 November 1780 - Piet Retief, Voortrekker leader is born at Wagenmakersvallei, Cape Colony. (d. 1838)
- 10 August 1783 - Louis Tregardt, Voortrekker leader, is born at Kango, in the Swellendam District. (d. 1838)
- July 1787 - Shaka kaSenzangakhona, Zulu monarch, is born near present-day Melmoth, KwaZulu-Natal Province. (d. 1828)
- 1789 - Andries Waterboer, founder of the Waterboer dynasty of Griqualand West is born north of the Gariep river. (d. 1852)

== Deaths ==
- 23 July 1781 - Martin Melck, the founder of the Lutheran church in Strand Street, Cape Town
