= Trekboers =

Historical group of pastoralists in Southern Africa

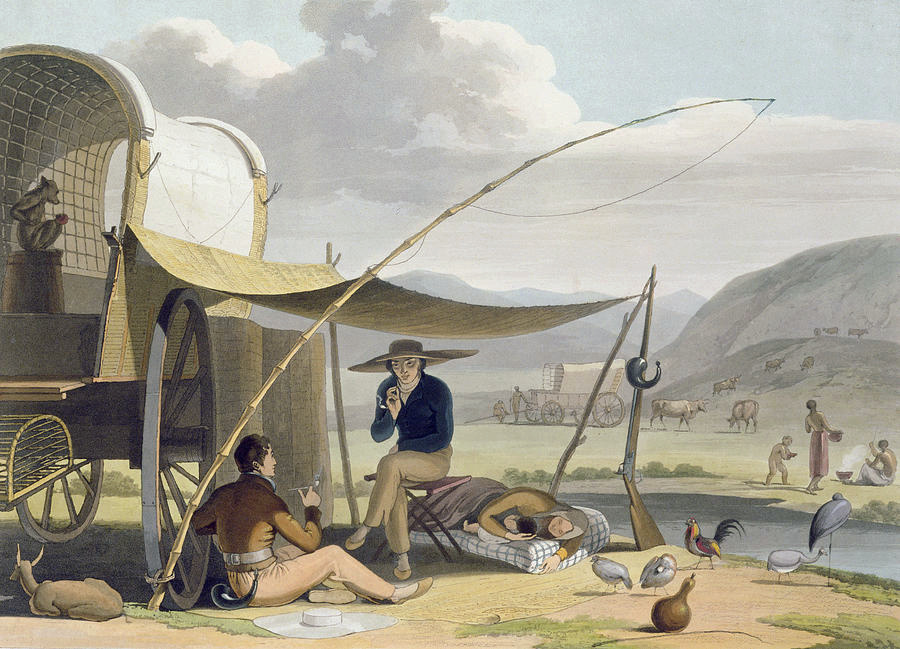
An aquatint by Samuel Daniell of Trekboers making camp. Depicted around 1804.

The Trekboers (/ˈtrɛkbʊərz/ Afrikaans: Trekboere) were nomadic or seminomadic pastoralists descended from mostly Dutch colonists on the frontiers of the Dutch Cape Colony in Southern Africa. The Trekboers began migrating into the interior from the areas surrounding what is now Cape Town, such as Paarl (settled from 1688), Stellenbosch (founded in 1679), and Franschhoek (settled from 1688), during the late 17th century and throughout the 18th century.

== Origins and identity ==
The Trekboers were seminomadic pastoralists, subsistence farmers who began trekking both northwards and eastwards into the interior to find better pastures/farmlands for their livestock to graze. To some extent they emerged out of the Cape's loan farm system, whereby the Dutch East India Company (or VOC) issued grazing rights to extensive but less fertile farms in exchange for a rental: this practice encouraged farmers to move around with their flocks in search of seasonally available grazing. In other cases, Trekboers sought to escape the autocratic rule of the Dutch East India Company (or VOC), which administered the Cape, which they believed was tainted with corruption and not concerned with the interests of the free burghers, the social class of most of the Trekboers.

Trekboers also traded with indigenous people, especially between 1699 and 1725, when the VOC temporarily lifted its ban on livestock trading. This materialised largely as stripping Khoikhoi pastoralists of their herds. The access to animals from indigenous breeds meant their herds were of hardy local stock. Trekboers formed a vital link between the pool of animals in the interior and the providers of shipping provisions at the Cape. While some had a loan farm as a base, which was sometimes shared by several families, the poorer Trekboers were nomadic, living in their wagons and rarely remaining in one location for an extended period of time. A number of Trekboers settled in the eastern Cape, where their descendants became known as Grensboere (Border Farmers).

Trekboers maintained a strong identity based on Christian faith, cultural practices derived from European customs, as well as militia-type practices.

== Expansion ==
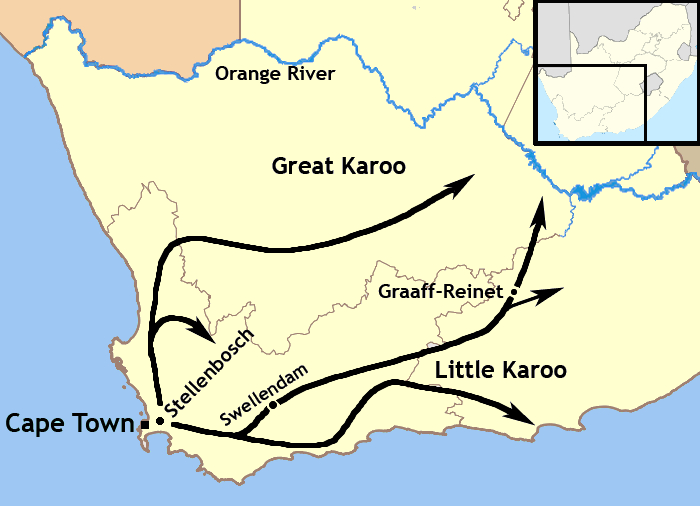
A map of the expansion of the Trekboers out of the Cape Colony between 1700 and 1800

Despite the VOC's attempts to prevent settler expansion beyond the western Cape, the frontier of the Colony remained open: the authorities in Cape Town lacked the means to police the Colony's borders. From 1700 onwards, they moved across the Berg River into the Tulbagh basin. In the early 1710s, they were spreading into the Olifants River valley and into the Bokkeveld. By the 1740s the Trekboers had entered the Little Karoo. By the 1760s they reached the deep interior of the Great Karoo.

The Trekboers' progress into the interior became increasingly threatening for the local populations. A large portion of the Khoikhoi pastoralists, having lost their livestock, stepped into the employ of Dutch-speaking farmers, with a status that deteriorated over time. San communities, who were traditionally hunter-gatherers, saw their livelihoods increasingly threatened by restricted access to water, the destruction of game through unsustainable hunting, overgrazing as well as farming techniques that reduced the carrying capacity of the soil. The response of the San and some of the Khoi to the expansion of the Trekboers was to resist through guerilla attacks, forcing Trekboers to pause their expansion after about 1770.

== Independent republics ==
Due to the collapse of the VOC (which went bankrupt in 1800) and inspired by the French Revolution (1789) and the American Revolution, groups of Boers rebelled against VOC rule. They set up independent republics in the town of Graaff-Reinet (1795), and four months later, in Swellendam (17 June 1795). A few months later, the newly established Batavian Republic nationalised the VOC (1 March 1796); the Netherlands came under the sway of the new post-revolution French government.

The British, who captured Cape Town in September 1795 in the course of the French Revolutionary Wars and took over the administration of Cape Colony, increased the level of government oversight the Trekboers were subject to. Tensions between the Trekboers and the British colonial administration would culminate in the Slachter's Nek Rebellion of 1815, which was rapidly suppressed and the leaders of the rebellion executed. Eventually, due to a combination of dissatisfaction with the British administration, constant frontier wars with the Xhosa to the east, and growing shortages of land, the Trekboers eventually went on the Great Trek.

== Legacy ==
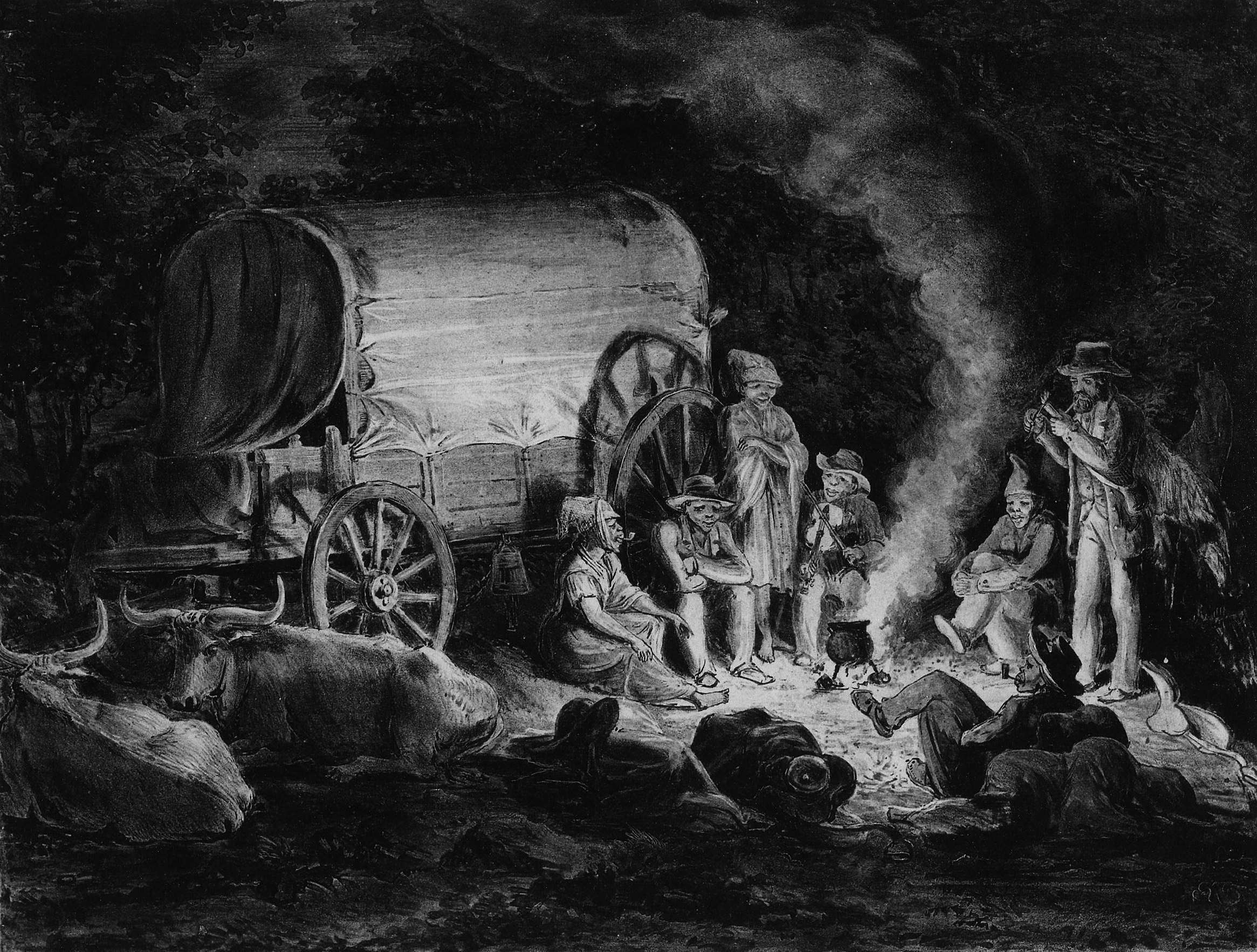
Mixed-race "Afrikander" Trekboer nomads in the Cape Colony, ancestral to the Baster people.

Numerous Trekboers settled down to become border farmers for a few generations and later voortrekkers. But many of the group continued well into the 19th century as an economic class of nomadic pastoralists.

Many Trekboers crossed the Orange River decades before the Voortrekkers did. Voortrekkers often encountered Trekboers in Transorangia during their Great Trek of the 1830s and 1840s. In 1815, a Trekboer/trader named Coenraad (Du) Buys (a surname of French Huguenot origin) was accused of cattle theft and fled from the British. He settled in the (western) Transvaal. He allegedly contracted polygamous marriages with hundreds of indigenous women, with his descendants' populating the town of Buysplaas in the Gourits River valley. He continued having numerous wives after leaving the colony. Descendants of his second series of marriages still live in the small town of Buysdorp, near the mission station of Mara, 20 km to the west of Louis Trichardt in the modern Limpopo province. Buys eventually disappeared while traveling along the Limpopo River.

By the late 17th century, both the Trekboers and the Voortrekkers were collectively called Boers.

== Language ==
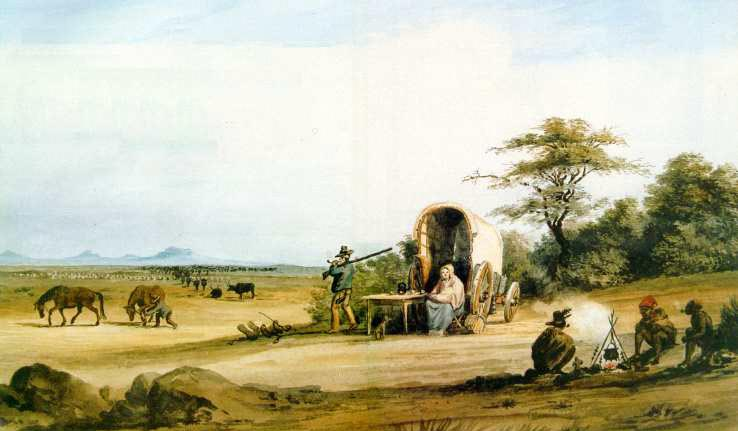
"Karoo Trekboer," by Charles Davidson Bell

The Trekboers spoke a variety of Dutch which they called die taal (lit. 'the language'), which evolved into the modern-day dialect Eastern Border Afrikaans, also known as East Cape Afrikaans. The Afrikaans language as a whole generally originated from 17th- and 18th-century Dutch dialects. Over time it incorporated numerous words and expressions from French, German, Portuguese, Malay, Khoi, and later also English. Still, roughly 90% of the vocabulary is of Dutch origin and it is closer linguistically to Standard Dutch than many Dutch dialects. If Afrikaans had not been defined a separate language during the 20th century, its various dialects would have been considered dialects of Dutch.

== See also ==
- Afrikaner Calvinism
- Afrikaner nationalism
- Boer
- Boer republics
- History of Cape Colony Pre-1806
