= 1740s in South Africa =

- 1720s 1730s « 1740s » 1750s 1760s
- List of years in South Africa

The following lists events that happened during the 1740s in South Africa.

== Events ==
=== 1741 ===
Flag of the Dutch East India Company.

- Henri Guillaume Bossau, founder of the Boshoff family in South Africa and great-grandfather of Jacobus Nicolaas Boshoff, 2nd state president of the Orange Free State, arrives in Cape Town from Bayonne, France as a locksmith in the service of the Dutch East India Company.

=== 1742 ===
- 25 January — Adriaan Valckenier, Governor-General of the Dutch East India Company, is arrested in Cape Town on sundry charges.

=== 1743 ===
- The Governor-General of the Dutch East India Company, Von Imhoff visits Cape Town.
- Simon's Bay is chosen to be used as a harbour between mid-May and mid-August because of the damage caused by the winter storms in Table Bay.
- A Dutch Reformed Church is established in Roodezand, today known as Tulbagh.

=== 1744 ===
- 5 March — Georg Schmidt, the first Protestant missionary in South Africa, who worked with the Khoikhoi, returns to Europe.

=== 1745 ===
- The Dutch East India Company established a magistracy at Swellendam.
- The Dutch Reformed Church establish a congregation in the Swartland, Malmesbury.

=== 1747 ===
- 22 February — A day of prayer and fasting is held for the elimination of the locust plague from Table Valley.
- 26 October — Swellendam is founded.

== Births ==
- 17 December 1747 — Petrus Johannes Truter, explorer and official in the East India Company, is born in Cape Town
- 28 August 1748 — Tjaart van der Walt, farmer and field commandant in the Third Cape Frontier War is born in the Roggeveld district of Sutherland, Cape Colony.

== Deaths ==
- 1743 — Jan de la Fontaine, Governor of the Cape Colony.
