= Meermin =

Hoeker of the Dutch East India Company

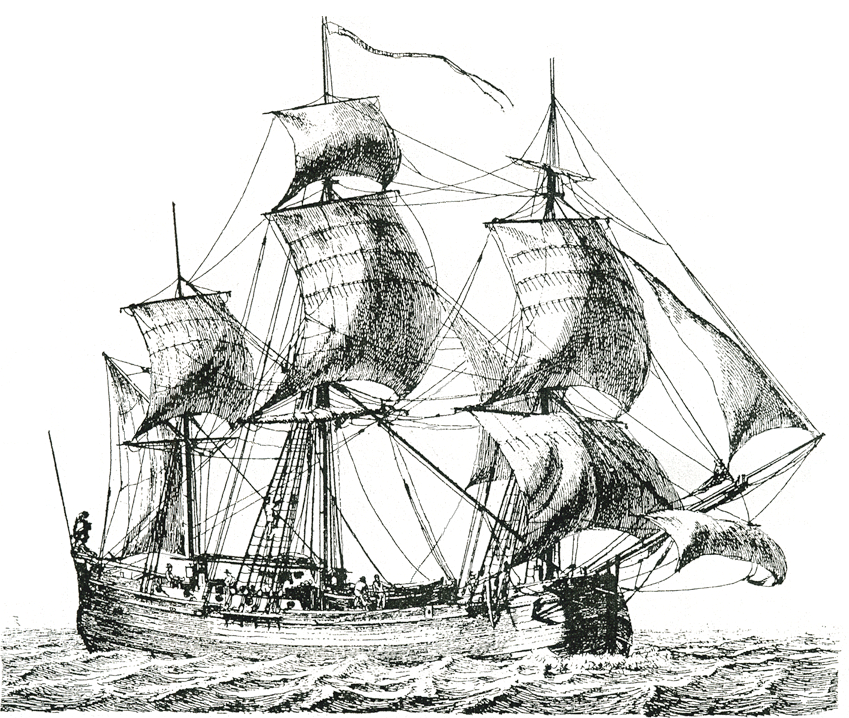
- An 18th-century Dutch hoeker similar to Meermin

History

Dutch Republic
- Name: Meermin
- Namesake: Dutch word for "mermaid"
- Owner: Dutch East India Company; Chamber of Amsterdam
- Builder: Dutch East India Company
- Laid down: 1759
- Commissioned: 1761
- Maiden voyage: Texel–Cape Colony
- Fate: Grounded off Struisbaai, southern Africa, 1766; broke up in situ

General characteristics (Note: Different sources describe the Meermin as a two-masted or single-masted ship of 450 tons, but, having examined the ship's plans, archaeologist Jaco Boshoff confirmed that she was one of the rarer, and heavier, oak-built three-masters. The ship's plans are held at the Nederlands Scheepvaartmuseum in Amsterdam, and are available to view online in low resolution. The ship type hoeker was named after its original purpose, using baited hooks to catch fish, and distinctive features of a hoeker are the "apple cheeks" of the bow. This ship's name, Meermin, is Dutch for "mermaid".)
- Type: Hoeker
- Tonnage: 480
- Length: 102 ft 2 in (31.14 m) (Note: Meermin is listed as 110 voet in length and had a keel to beam ratio of 10:3; one Amsterdam voet is approximately 11.15 inches (28.3 centimetres).)
- Beam: 29 ft 9 in (9.07 m)
- Draught: 11 ft 9 in (3.58 m)
- Sail plan: Full-rigged

Meermin (Dutch pronunciation: [ˈmeːrmɪn]) was a hoeker of the Dutch East India Company. She was laid down in 1759 and fitted out as a slave ship before her maiden voyage in 1761, and her career was cut short by a mutiny of her cargo of Malagasy people. They had been sold to Dutch East India Company officials on Madagascar, to be used as company slaves in its Cape Colony in southern Africa. Half her crew and almost 30 Malagasy lost their lives in the mutiny; the mutineers deliberately allowed the ship to drift aground off Struisbaai, now in South Africa, in March 1766, and she broke up in situ. As of 2013, archaeologists are searching for the Meermin's remains.

== Construction and use ==
Meermin was laid down in 1759 in a shipyard belonging to the Dutch East India Company (Vereenigde Oost-Indische Compagnie, abbreviated to "VOC") in the port of Amsterdam in the Netherlands. Meermin was a 480-ton Dutch hoeker, square rigged with three masts.

The hoeker originated in the 15th century as a type of fishing vessel with one or two masts in response to the growing Dutch trade in herring, and was known in English as a hoy. Equipped with guns, hoekers were employed as defensive escorts for fishing fleets, or Buisconvoyers, in the Second Anglo-Dutch War of the 1660s. They came to be used more widely in trade with the Dutch East Indies via the Cape of Good Hope in southern Africa, as their rounded sterns proved to be more resistant to warping and springing than square sterns, which were prone to "catastrophic leaking when exposed to strong sun." Larger than most hoekers, the Meermin was unusual for her type in that she was built of oak and had a beakhead, a feature not normally present in smaller merchant vessels.

Meermin was built for use as a slave ship in the VOC's African trade; between 1658 and 1799 the VOC acquired and transported 63,000 slaves to its Cape Colony, now part of South Africa. The ship began her maiden voyage at Texel, an island off the coast of what is now the Netherlands, on 21 January 1761, with a crew of 62 under the command of Captain Hendrik Worms; she arrived at the Cape of Good Hope on 15 June. Although fitted out as a slave ship, vessels such as the Meermin routinely carried other goods when not transporting slaves.

== Mutiny and destruction ==
From December 1765, Meermin was working the coastline of Madagascar, collecting Malagasy men, women and children for use as slaves in the Cape Colony, under Captain Gerrit Muller and a crew of 56. (Note: The sources use various 18th-century Dutch terms, not all of which are easily translated into modern English: Captain Muller's rank is given as "Gesaghebber"; the magistrate from Stellenbosch was a "Landdrost".) Carrying about 140 Malagasy, she set sail from the north-western coast of Madagascar on 20 January 1766. (Note: The exact number of Malagasy on Meermin is unknown, since officers on VOC ships carried out their own, undeclared trade, to the extent that this is how "most slaves actually got to the Cape [Colony]"; it was also a cause of severe over-crowding on slave ships. Some of the Malagasy gave their number as 150.)

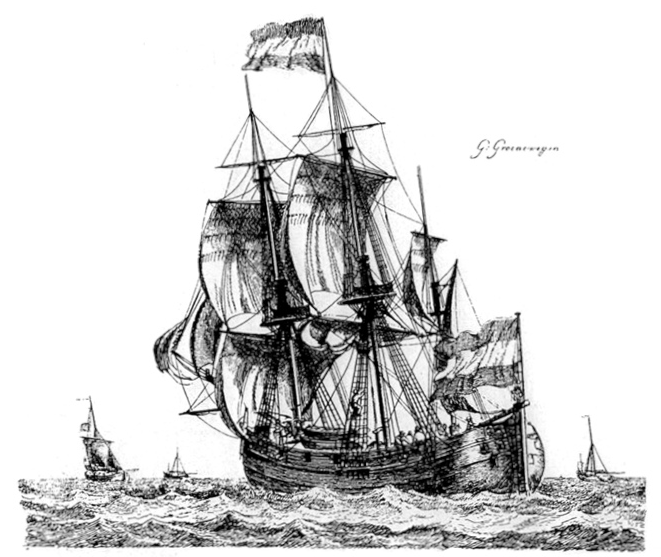
Three-masted, square rigged hoeker: Groenewegen, 1789

Two days into the voyage a "large party of [Malagasy]" was allowed on deck, the men to assist the crew, and the women to provide entertainment by dancing and singing. This was to prevent death and disease among the Malagasy, so avoiding loss of profit.

On 18 February 1766, the ship's supercargo ordered some assegais, or African spears, and some swords, to be brought on deck for the Malagasy to clean. When the weapons were clean and the Malagasy were ordered to return them, they attacked the ship's crew, and took control of the ship. A truce ensued, the terms of which were that if the Malagasy would spare the lives of the remaining crew the ship would be sailed back to Madagascar, but taking advantage of the Malagasy's lack of navigational skills, the crew instead set sail for the coast of southern Africa.

On sighting land, the crew persuaded the Malagasy that what they saw was a part of Madagascar the mutineers were unfamiliar with: after further subterfuge by the crew, the Malagasy set Meermin to drift towards the shore at Struisbaai. But the sea was rough, and one of the ship's masts was cut down to improve her balance. Meermin eventually grounded on a sandbank, by which time a militia consisting of local farmers and burghers had been formed onshore, who had observed that the ship was flying no flags, which they recognised as a distress signal. The militia killed or captured those of the Malagasy who ventured ashore, and then organised the removal into custody of all Malagasy remaining on the ship, under the command of a magistrate from Stellenbosch. Meermin was assessed as beyond recovery, and left to break up where she grounded.

== Salvage and archaeology ==
Iron fastenings were used extensively in wooden ships. This combined with the possible presence of anchors and cannon give fairly good signatures.

— Jaco Boshoff

The VOC authorities salvaged as much as possible from Meermin, recovering 286 muskets, 12 pistols, 5 bayonets, gunpowder, musket balls and compasses; cables, ropes and other items from the ship were auctioned on the shore. The ship's logbook has not survived. In 2004, Iziko Museums started a maritime archaeology project to find and recover the wreck of Meermin, with supporting historical and archaeological research funded by the South African National Lottery.

Jaco Boshoff of Iziko Museums, who is in charge of the research, retrieved Meermin's plans from the Netherlands, to help identify this wreck among the numerous ships reputed to have run aground in the Struisbaai area. The search for Meermin has employed an airborne magnetometer survey, as a marine magnetometer survey proved to be impractical owing to the shallowness of the waters. Magnetometer surveys can readily pick out wreck sites, as iron items from the ships can be detected by their recognisable signatures.

Of 22 new, possible wrecks identified, 11 were identified as candidates for the wreck of Meermin. Six are on what is now land, but have been ruled out as they are wrecks of pine-built ships, whereas Meermin was built of oak. In 2011, the Iziko Museums' travelling exhibition "Finding Meermin" included updates on the progress of Jaco Boshoff's work with the archaeological research team. In November 2013 it was reported that, while the ship had not yet been found, lack of funding was holding up completion of the search, with four target areas remaining to be examined.
