= Pieter Gysbert Noodt =

South African ruler

5th Governor of the Dutch Cape Colony
- In office 25 February 1727 – 23 April 1729
- Preceded by: Jan de la Fontaine (acting)
- Succeeded by: Jan de la Fontaine

Personal details
- Born: 4 April 1681 Nijmegen, Netherlands
- Died: 23 April 1729 (aged 48) Cape Town
- Spouse: Johanna Drabbe

Pieter Gysbert Noodt (1681-1729) was the Dutch governor of the Cape of Good Hope from 1727 to 1729. He was first employed by the United East India Company as director of fortifications in India, and visited the Cape of Good Hope for the first time in 1718, where he remained for nearly a year. He was a combative character, but it was not until his return to the Cape in 1727 as governor that it became clear exactly how unfit he was for office. He has explored some forests in the interior, but his name is mainly associated with the barbaric treatment of a number of soldiers, driven to obscurity by his actions.

His unexpected death, while still sitting in his chair, was then seen as divine intervention.

Noodt was buried in the Groote Kerk, Cape Town in April 1729.
