= Adriaan van Kervel =

Governor of the Cape Colony

7th Governor of the Dutch Cape Colony
- In office 31 August 1737 – 19 September 1737
- Preceded by: Jan de la Fontaine
- Succeeded by: Daniël van den Henghel (acting)

Personal details
- Born: c. 1681 The Hague
- Died: 19 September 1737 Cape Town
- Spouse: Aletta Corsenaar

Adriaan van Kervel (c. 1681 – 19 September 1737) was the governor of the Dutch Cape Colony from 31 August 1737 to 19 September 1737. After only three weeks of serving as the Governor he died and Daniël van den Henghel was appointed in an acting capacity.

== Career ==
Van Kervel arrived at the Cape on 3 February 1708, where he became an assistant in the secretariat of the Council of Policy. He was a member of the Council of Justice and in 1717 he was appointed secretary to the Council of Policy. In 1725 he succeeded Cornelis van Beaumont as fiscal and was promoted to the rank of secunde (second in command or deputy governor). From 1726 to 1727, he was the chairman of the orphan chamber and again from 1730 to 1737.

When Governor Jan de la Fontaine retired from office in 1737, the Lords XVII (Heren XVII) appointed Van Kervel as his successor. He took office on 31 August 1737 but died less than three weeks, after a brief illness.

== Personal ==
Van Kervel was the third child of Johannes van Kervel and his wife Anna Koene and was baptized at The Hague on 23 July 1681. His eldest brother, Gerard, was the Governor of the East Coast of Java. Van Kervel married Aletta Corsenaar on 14 June 1716 at the Cape and they had five children.

== See also ==
- 1730s in South Africa
