= Daniël van den Henghel =

Acting Governor of the Dutch Cape Colony
- In office 19 September 1737 – 14 April 1739
- Preceded by: Adriaan van Kervel
- Succeeded by: Hendrik Swellengrebel

Personal details
- Born: c. 1699 Utrecht
- Spouse: Alida de Leeuw

Daniël van den Henghel (born c. 1699) was a VOC official, fiscal and acting governor at the Cape.

== Career at the Cape Colony ==
Van den Henghel arrived at the Cape in March 1731 from Ceylon. The day after the death of Adriaan van Kervel, the Council of Policy at the Cape met for the purpose of electing an acting head. Van den Henghel and the secunde, Hendrik Swellengrebel, made themselves available for the position. Van den Henghel, claimed the appointment, on the ground that he had been a senior merchant longer than Swellengrebel and had been in the colony since 1731. As the council reached a stalemate with the election it was decided to determine the appointment by drawing lots, with the result going in favour of Van den Henghel.

When the Lords XVII (Heren XVII) received report of the arrangements made at the Cape for carrying on the government, they expressed their disapproval, because they considered the secunde the proper person to assume authority upon the death of a governor. They then sent out instructions that Van den Henghel should return to his office of fiscal and that Swellengrebel should take the place of governor, with Ryk Tulbagh as secunde. These changes took effect on 14 April 1739. Van den Henghel remained in the colony as fiscal until the 18th of September 1741, when he was relieved by Pieter van Reede van Oudtshoorn, whereafter Van den Henghel returned to the Netherlands in 1742.

== Personal ==
Van den Henghel was the son of Carel van den Henghel and Maria van Baarle. He was born in Utrecht and was baptized there on 15 August 1699. He married Alida de Leeuw.

== See also ==
- 1730s in South Africa
