= El Nuevo Constante =

El Nuevo Constante was a Spanish merchant ship that was run aground on the coast of Louisiana, U.S., after serious leaks had been incurred during a hurricane in September 1766. Much of the cargo was salvaged at the time by the Spanish working into November after burning the part of the ship that was above the water line, but then the wreck was abandoned and forgotten. It was rediscovered in 1979, making it the first historic shipwreck found off that state's coast. Excavation of the wreck and its well-preserved artifacts has revealed details of the construction of this British-made vessel, and of life aboard ship and of the cargo carried. These details have been augmented by considerable documentary material such as the ship's manifest and cargo list. The excavation of the ship was concluded in 1981.

The ship's construction and configuration has been presented using contemporary records from 1774 and 1776 and examination of the lower part of the ship's hull in situ. According to the records of the time, it was a ship of some 470 tons. The craft was about 121 feet (documents of March 1764) or 127.5 feet (archaeological measurement) long. The oak frame was held together with both iron and wooden nails.

While most of the cargo was either salvaged or ruined by the elements at the time of the grounding, fragmentary remains were missed, only to be found over two centuries later. Among these were Mexican ceramics such as miniature shoes, animals and musical instruments as well as Guadalajara ware. The ship also carried various dye stuffs, including leather bags containing more than 10,000 pounds of cochineal. Archaeologists recovered some of these dye containers. In addition to silver coins, cacao and vanilla beans were valuable items in the cargo that were salvaged right after the storm. Exotic lading included two kimono that were also rescued by the Spanish. Although all the silver coins listed on the manifest were recovered immediately after the storm, no silver or gold ingots were listed as being on board or as having been recovered; however, archaeologists recovered some gold and over eighty pounds of silver ingots. It is concluded that these unmarked pieces were contraband not originally recovered because they were not very accessible and the owners did not want to make a fuss over them lest the government salvage officials find out they had been smuggling strenuously controlled goods.

In addition, items used by the crew were recovered by the archaeologists in the late twentieth century. These include porcelain, glassware, olive jars, grindstones, and the remains of bones from various animals. All recovered artifacts are in the possession of the state government.

The lower structure was not removed, and lies in the Gulf of Mexico at coordinates 29°34.837′N 92°39.299′W.
