= Jan de la Fontaine =

Dutch colonial governor

Acting Governor of the Dutch Cape Colony
- In office 8 September 1724 – 25 February 1727
- Preceded by: Maurits Pasques de Chavonnes
- Succeeded by: Pieter Gysbert Noodt

6th Governor of the Dutch Cape Colony
- In office acting from 23 April 1729 and Governor from 8 March 1730 – 31 August 1737
- Preceded by: Pieter Gysbert Noodt
- Succeeded by: Adriaan van Kervel

Personal details
- Born: c. 1684 Amsterdam, Dutch Republic
- Died: 6 May 1743 Wijk aan Zee, Dutch Republic
- Spouse: Maria Elisabeth de Man

Jan de la Fontaine (c. 1684 – 6 May 1743) was governor of the Cape from 1729 to 1737, after also acting as governor in 1724 to 1727.

== Career ==
De la Fontaine started his career with the Dutch East India Company (VOC) in 1708 when he was sent to Batavia. In 1710 he was re-employed in the Dutch Cape Colony and arrived at the Cape in March 1710. At the Cape he was appointed assistant and junior merchant and progressed through the ranks to member of the council of policy in 1713 and in 1717, was given the rank of merchant.

On the death of governor, Maurits Pasques de Chavonnes on 8 September 1724, De la Fontaine was appointed acting governor. He served in this capacity until 25 February 1727, when the new governor, Pieter Gysbert Noodt, assumed office. De la Fontaine then applied for discharge from the service of the VOC, but his request was rejected, and the company gave him a promotion to senior merchant and increased his salary substantially. When Noodt died in 1729, De la Fontaine was again appointed acting governor on 24 April 1729 and on 8 March 1730 the Lords XVII (Heren XVII) confirmed his appointment as governor and he took the oath on 21 March 1731.

During his administration, De la Fontaine endeavoured to expand the Cape settlement into the interior. In July 1734, he travelled to the vicinity of Mossel Bay and although he thought little of the harbour, he claimed the bay for the VOC and proclaimed the Great Brak River as the eastern boundary of the Cape. New outposts were also established in 1734, at Riviersonderend, at Rietvlei on the Buffeljags River, and at St Helena Bay.

In 1736 De la Fontaine again asked to be released, in part because he wanted to ensure good education for his children. His request was granted and in August 1737 he handed his duties to his successor, Adriaan van Kervel.

== Personal life ==
De la Fontaine was the eldest of the four children of Jacques (Jacob) de la Fontaine and Barbara van der Burgh and was baptized in Amsterdam on 23 April 1684. At the Cape he married Maria Elisabeth de Man on 10 May 1711, who was born and died at the Cape and they had a son and a daughter. In February 1738, De la Fontaine and his family sailed for Holland, where he bought Westerhout, a farmstead at Wijk aan Zee and lived there until his death.

== See also ==
- 1720s in South Africa
- 1730s in South Africa
