= Struisbaai =

Coastal town in Western Cape, South Africa

- Town
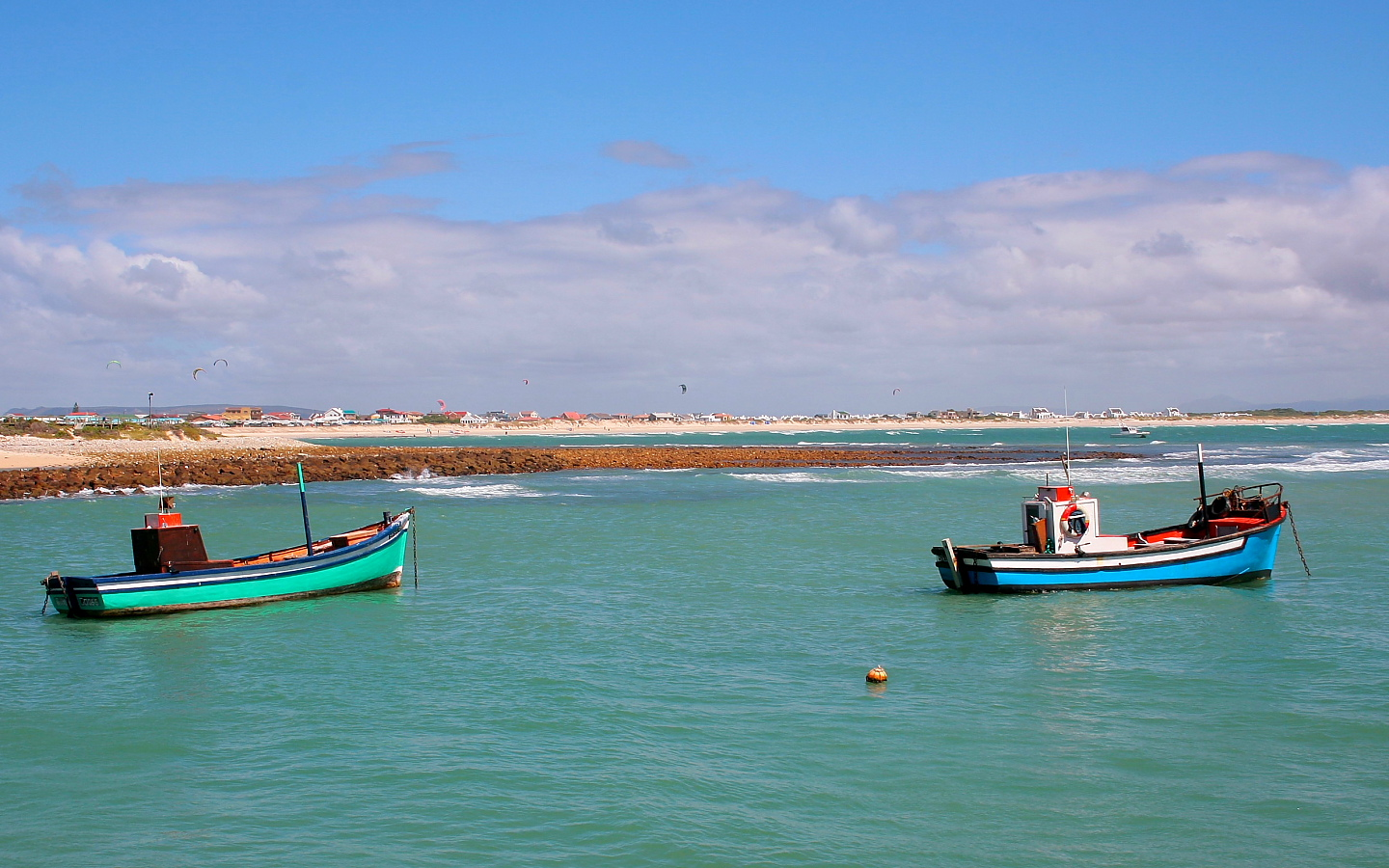
- Struisbaai Harbour

- Location within Western Cape Location within South Africa Location within Africa
- Coordinates: 34°48′16″S 20°03′27″E
- Country: South Africa
- Province: Western Cape
- District: Overberg
- Municipality: Cape Agulhas

Area
  - Total: 14.34 km^{2} (5.54 sq mi)

Population (2011)
  - Total: 3,877
  - Density: 270.4/km^{2} (700.2/sq mi)

Racial makeup (2011)
  - Black African: 12.6%
  - Coloured: 50.3%
  - Indian/Asian: 0.4%
  - White: 35.5%
  - Other: 1.2%

First languages (2011)
  - Afrikaans: 85.2%
  - English: 9.0%
  - Xhosa: 2.6%
  - Other: 3.2%
- Time zone: UTC+2 (SAST)
- Postal code (street): 7280
- PO box: 7280
- Area code: 028

Struisbaai (/ˈstreɪsbaɪ/ STRAYSS-by) is a coastal town in the Overberg region of South Africa's Western Cape province. The town is in the Cape Agulhas Local Municipality in the Overberg District, about two hundred kilometres south east of Cape Town, and four kilometres from Cape Agulhas, which is the southernmost point of the African continent.

The town is an old fishing village which for many years sported a beautiful natural harbour. Some development has taken place since then but Struisbaai is still relatively untouched by the rigours of over-development. Many fishermen still reside in this settlement but it is now known better for its leisure activities, which include fishing, horseriding, hiking, paintball, quadbiking and diving.

== History ==
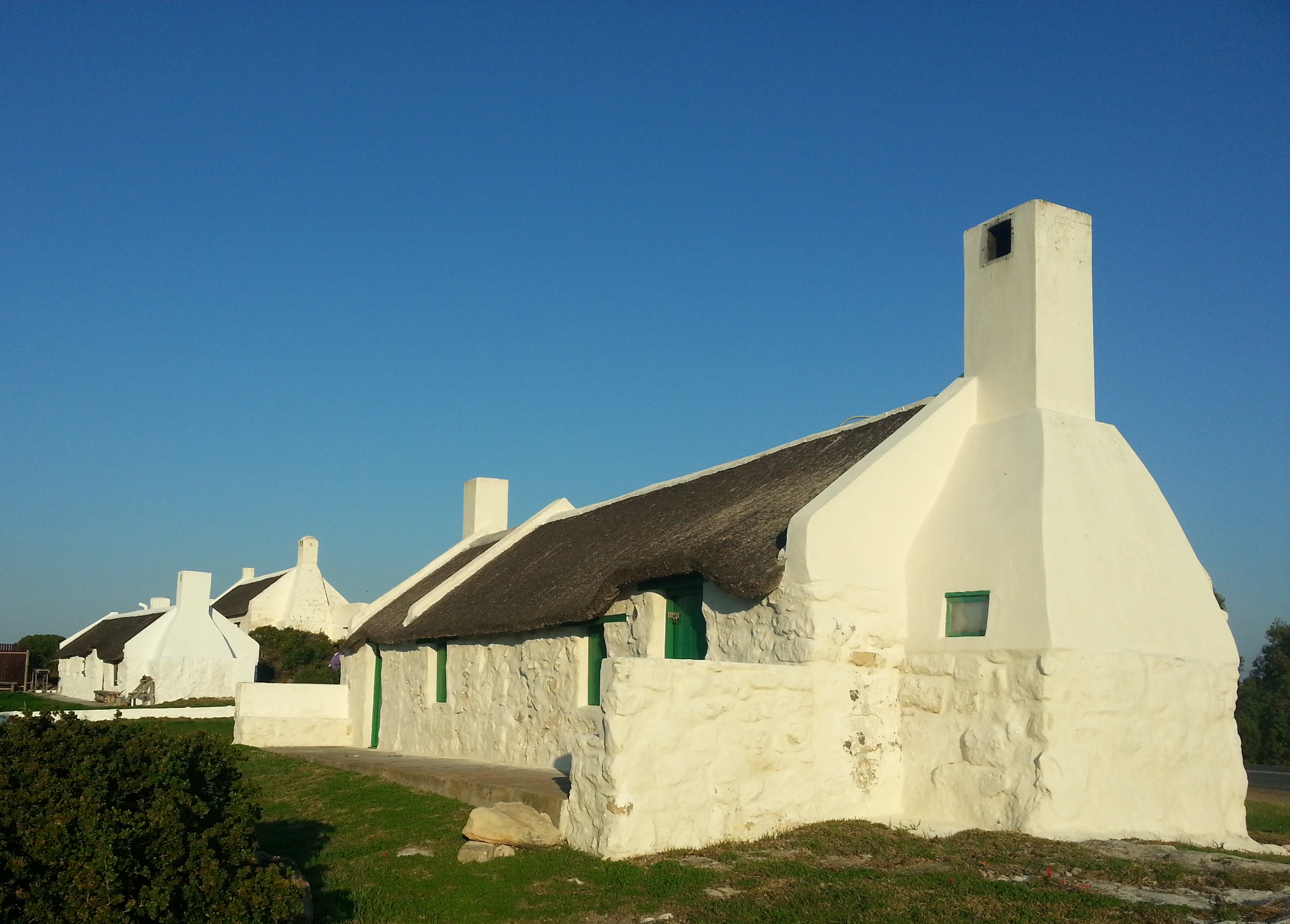
Fisherman's cottages, Hotagterklip

The exact origins of the name of Struisbaai is uncertain. The various historical stories uncover 3 different origins for the name of the town. The first being accredited to the thatch or straw (strooi in Afrikaans) roofs of the fisherman cottages scattered along the coast. Another is the ostriches ("struisvogel" in Dutch) that used to call this area their home, while others believe the name was derived from an old Dutch word meaning "huge" given due to the long stretches of beach. The last origin seems more plausible as Struisbaai holds the longest beach in the Southern Hemisphere which stretches for a total of 14 kilometres.

Struisbaai also hosts the annual Geelstertfees (Yellowtail festival) which revolves around foodstalls, artists and musical performers. Other Top Attractions in the town include the colourful, bustling Struisbaai Harbour where visitors can see the traditional fisherman bring in their daily catch and buy fresh fish. Also not to be missed, is the resident stingray Parrie making an appearance.

The waters off Struisbaai have traditionally been treacherous for shipping, with at least 30 vessels that have run aground since 1673. One of them was the Meermin that stranded in 1766 after a mutiny by the Malagasy slaves she was carrying, while another was the French ship Jardinière, which sank 28 years later.

Prior to apartheid, Struisbaai was racially mixed. After the passing of the Group Areas Act, the apartheid government began evicting colored residents and demolishing their homes. Families were promised R48,000 compensation but only ever received half. Some families were put in houses in Rondomskrik, today known as Struisbaai Noord. Other families were forced to live in shacks with dozens of people occupying the same quarters. Colored fishermen who had previously lived near the harbor were forced to walk over three kilometers to their boats and were restricted from being in the white part of town after 6:00 PM. The legacy of apartheid remains visible today with the Struisbaai Noord remaining largely colored while the main part of town near the harbor is predominantly white.

== Climate ==
Climate data for Cape Agulhas (1991–2020 normals)
| Month | Jan | Feb | Mar | Apr | May | Jun | Jul | Aug | Sep | Oct | Nov | Dec | Year |
|---|---|---|---|---|---|---|---|---|---|---|---|---|---|
| Record high °C (°F) | 28.9 (84.0) | 36.1 (97.0) | 35.0 (95.0) | 35.6 (96.1) | 33.9 (93.0) | 30.0 (86.0) | 29.4 (84.9) | 31.7 (89.1) | 32.2 (90.0) | 26.1 (79.0) | 30.6 (87.1) | 30.6 (87.1) | 36.1 (97.0) |
| Mean daily maximum °C (°F) | 24.6 (76.3) | 24.6 (76.3) | 23.3 (73.9) | 21.1 (70.0) | 19.8 (67.6) | 18.5 (65.3) | 17.9 (64.2) | 18.0 (64.4) | 18.7 (65.7) | 20.2 (68.4) | 21.7 (71.1) | 23.7 (74.7) | 21.0 (69.8) |
| Daily mean °C (°F) | 21.4 (70.5) | 21.5 (70.7) | 20.3 (68.5) | 18.1 (64.6) | 16.7 (62.1) | 15.1 (59.2) | 14.5 (58.1) | 14.7 (58.5) | 15.5 (59.9) | 17.3 (63.1) | 18.5 (65.3) | 20.6 (69.1) | 17.9 (64.1) |
| Mean daily minimum °C (°F) | 18.2 (64.8) | 18.5 (65.3) | 17.3 (63.1) | 15.2 (59.4) | 13.6 (56.5) | 11.8 (53.2) | 11.1 (52.0) | 11.3 (52.3) | 12.4 (54.3) | 14.3 (57.7) | 15.4 (59.7) | 17.5 (63.5) | 14.7 (58.5) |
| Record low °C (°F) | 8.3 (46.9) | 8.9 (48.0) | 9.4 (48.9) | 5.0 (41.0) | 4.4 (39.9) | 5.6 (42.1) | 3.9 (39.0) | 4.4 (39.9) | 4.4 (39.9) | 5.0 (41.0) | 5.0 (41.0) | 5.0 (41.0) | 3.9 (39.0) |
| Average precipitation mm (inches) | 20.3 (0.80) | 17.8 (0.70) | 33.0 (1.30) | 38.1 (1.50) | 50.8 (2.00) | 58.4 (2.30) | 53.3 (2.10) | 48.3 (1.90) | 40.6 (1.60) | 38.1 (1.50) | 27.9 (1.10) | 17.8 (0.70) | 444.4 (17.50) |
| Average precipitation days | 1 | 1 | 3 | 3 | 4 | 4 | 4 | 3 | 3 | 2 | 2 | 1 | 31 |
| Average relative humidity (%) | 77 | 79 | 83 | 84 | 81 | 80 | 80 | 82 | 81 | 79 | 79 | 77 | 80 |
Source 1: Sistema de Clasificación Bioclimática Mundial (precipitation and humidity 1961–1990) Starlings Roost Weather
Source 2: Weatherbase
