= Ryk Tulbagh =

Dutch Governor of the Cape Colony

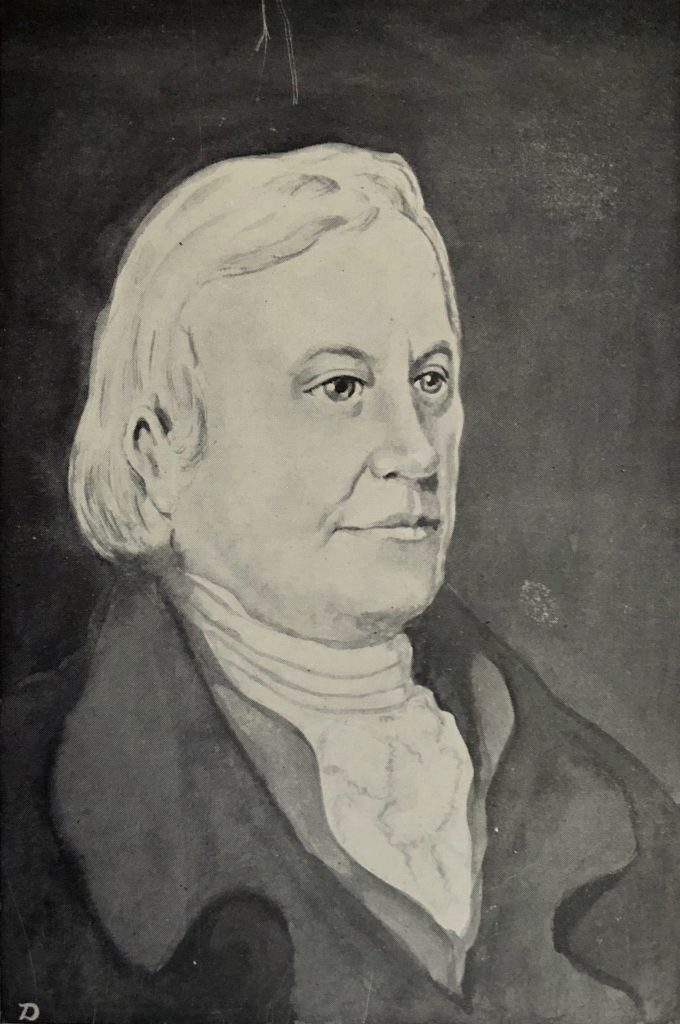

9th Governor of the Dutch Cape Colony
- In office 27 February 1751 – 11 August 1771
- Preceded by: Hendrik Swellengrebel
- Succeeded by: Joachim van Plettenberg (acting)

Personal details
- Born: 14 May 1699 Utrecht, Netherlands
- Died: 11 August 1771 (aged 72) Cape Town, Dutch Cape Colony
- Resting place: Groote Kerk, Cape Town
- Spouse: Elizabeth Swellengrebel

Ryk Tulbagh (14 May 1699, Utrecht – 11 August 1771, Cape Town) was Governor of the Dutch Cape Colony from 27 February 1751 to 11 August 1771 under the Dutch East India Company (VOC).

Tulbagh was the son of Dirk Tulbagh and Catharina Cattepoel, who moved their family to Bergen op Zoom when Rijk was still an infant. There he attended the Latin school. As a 16-year-old he enlisted with the Dutch East India Company and in 1716 sailed as a cadet on the ship Huys Terhorst to South Africa. His career with the Company advanced rapidly. He was appointed a temporary assistant to the Council of Policy in 1716 and he received a full appointment in 1718. In 1723 he became chief clerk and later in the same year book-keeper. In 1725 he rose to become secretary to the Council of Policy and in 1726 to Junior Merchant. In 1732 he became a merchant. In 1739 he became Secunde (the second highest administrative post) and 27 February 1751 he was appointed Governor.

In 1725 Tulbagh married Elizabeth Swellengrebel, the sister of Hendrik Swellengrebel, Governor of the Cape Colony at the time. She died in 1753. Tulbagh himself died in 1771 and was buried in the Groote Kerk in the grave of his wife and father-in-law.

Tulbagh was known for importing from Batavia 124-provision sumptuary law restricting extravagance. The 1755 Cape law, promulgated at the request of Batavia Governor-General Jacob Mossel, declared that only he could decorate his carriage with the colonial coat of arms and that he and the Council alone could dress their coaches in livery. Lower officials and their wives were prohibited from carrying umbrellas (called kiepersol or parasols and a major status symbol), and all women were banned from lining dresses with silk or velvet. The then-current fashion of gowns with a train was verboten, as were any frippery at funerals. He also codified the Tulbagh Code of colonial slave law, published in 1754. This loosened restrictions somewhat, only imposing the death penalty on those who killed their masters versus forced labor for lesser offences, allowing them to practice a trade to support themselves and buy their freedom as well as others', and placing said free blacks (called Fryswartes) on an equal legal footing with white settlers.

Nicknamed "Father Tulbagh" for introducing road maintenance, firefighting, and police among other civil services, Tulbagh did much to temper the smallpox epidemics of 1755 and 1767, which wiped out almost the entire Khoekhoe population of the area. The first was the worst to hit the white population, bringing it down from 6,110 to 5,123 in spite of high birth rates, and also killed over 500 slaves. The second one killed more than 500 people and was not eliminated until 1770.

In 1761, he built the first library in the Cape to house books donated by Joachim Nikolaus von Dessin, secretary of the orphan chamber and therefore guardian of estates. Tulbagh was of an intellectual and benevolent disposition. He wrote Latin and French and enjoyed the company of several foreign intellectuals who visited the Cape during his governorship. These included the astronomers Nicolas-Louis de La Caille, Charles Mason and Jeremiah Dixon and the French writer Bernardin de Saint-Pierre. Over a long period Tulbagh corresponded with several botanists including Carl Linnaeus and sent him more than 200 specimens of local plants. Linnaeus named the plant Tulbaghia in his honour.

An expedition sent northeast in 1752 was the largest since that of Simon van der Stel in 1685 and traveled through the lands of the Thembu and Xhosa by the Qora River, returning 8 months later. Later, Captain Hendrik Hop journeyed north of the Orange River, in part to determine how far inland cattle farmers had settled. In 1770, Tulbagh declared the Gamtoos River the eastern border of the Swellendam district and the Swartberg mountains the northern one, but was unable to defend them.

The Western Cape town of Tulbagh is named after him in 1804.

== Sources ==
- Büttner, H.D. (1980). Kennis : die eerste Afrikaanse ensiklopedie in kleur, vol 4, p. 681. Cape Town: Human & Rousseau. ISBN 0 7981 0826 6
- De Kock, W.J., and Krüger, D.W. (eds.) (1972). Dictionary of South African Biography, vol. II. Cape Town: Human Sciences Resource Council/Tafelberg, 1972
- Gledhill, D. (6 March 2008). The Names of Plants. Cambridge University Press. ISBN 978-0-521-86645-3.
- Spilhaus, Margaret Whiting (1973). Company's Men. J. Malherbe. ISBN 978-0-86966-052-2.
- Theal, George McCall (1888). History of South Africa 1691-1795. S. Sonnenschein & Company. pp. 137-183.
- 1982. Wêreldspektrum, vol. 27, p. 166-167. Roodepoort: Ensiklopedie Afrikana. ISBN 0908409680
