= History of the Cape Colony before 1806 =

History of South African region

The written history of the Cape Colony in what is now South Africa began when Portuguese navigator Bartolomeu Dias became the first modern European to round the Cape of Good Hope in 1488. In 1497, Vasco da Gama sailed along the whole coast of South Africa on his way to India, landed at St Helena Bay for 8 days, and made a detailed description of the area. The Portuguese, attracted by the riches of Asia, made no permanent settlement at the Cape Colony. However, the Dutch East India Company (VOC) settled the area as a location where vessels could restock water and provisions.

== First settlement ==
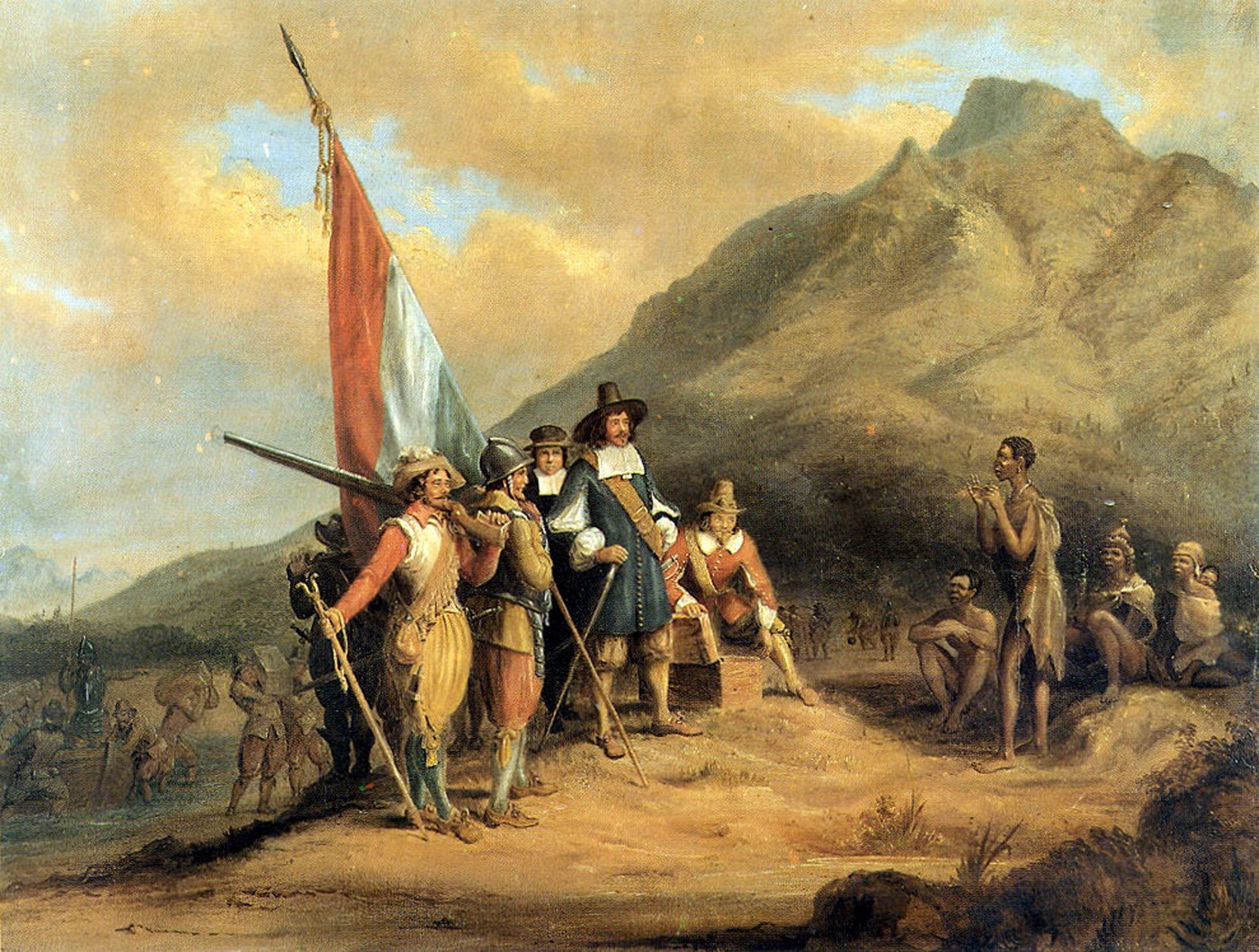
A romanticised depiction of the arrival of Jan van Riebeeck in Table Bay (by Charles Bell)

The Dutch East India Company settlement in the area began in March 1647 with the shipwreck of the Dutch ship Nieuwe Haarlem. The shipwreck victims built a small fort that they named the "Sand Fort of the Cape of Good Hope." They stayed for nearly a year, until they were rescued by a fleet of 12 ships under the command of W. G. de Jong.

After their return to Holland, some of the shipwrecked crew tried to persuade the Dutch East India Company to open a trading center at the Cape.

A Dutch East India Company expedition of 90 Calvinist settlers, under the command of Jan van Riebeeck, founded the first permanent settlement near the Cape of Good Hope in 1652. Jan van Riebeeck was on one of the ships that had come to rescue the shipwrecked sailors, and upon seeing the land, he decided to come back. They arrived in the harbour of modern-day Cape Town on 6 April 1652 with five ships:

- Dromedaris
- Goede Hoop
- Oliphant
- Reijger
- Walvisch

The settlers initially built a clay and timber fort. It was replaced between 1666 and 1679 by the Castle of Good Hope, which is now the oldest building in South Africa. The Colony began properly in 1671 with the first purchase of land from the Khoikhoi (called "Hottentots" by the settlers) beyond the original limits of the fort built by Van Riebeeck.

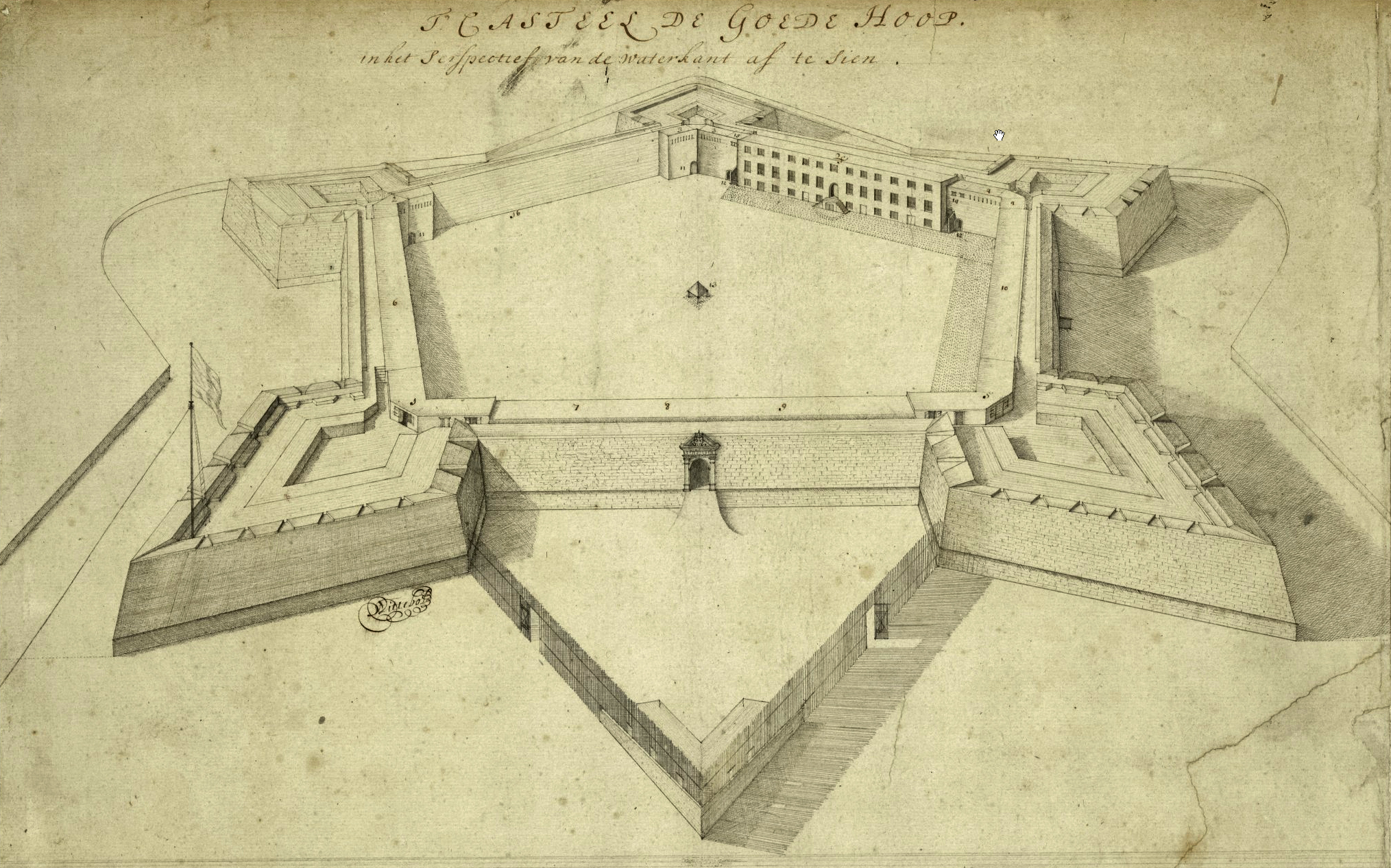
Sketch of Castle of Good Hope Courtyard in 1680

A long-term policy of the VOC was to limit the growth of the colony to a small, clearly defined area. Initially the VOC had hoped to employ a small number of servants and employees to produce food close to the fortress whilst obtaining cattle from the local Khoikhoi. However repeated crop failures convinced company officials to release nine servants to become semi-independent burgers who would produce food on freehold farms. Land grants were limited until the arrival of the colony's new commander Simon van der Stel in 1679.

Van der Stel pursued an expansionist agricultural policy which was continued by his son William, increasing the number of farms in the colony to 258 by 1705. The number of freehold farms almost doubled by 1731 to 435 farms. Income inequality increased rapidly in the early years of the colony's development and by 1731 only 7% of the colony's small free settler population controlled over half of all the private property in the colony.

The earliest colonists were, for the most part, from the lower working class and displayed an indifferent attitude towards developing the colony, but after a commissioner was sent out in 1685 to attract more settlers, a more dedicated group of immigrants began to arrive. French refugees began to arrive in the Cape after the revocation of the Edict of Nantes. This small body of immigrants had a marked influence on the character of the Dutch settlers. Owing to the policy of the Dutch East India Company instituted in 1701 which dictated that schools should teach exclusively in Dutch and applied strict laws of assembly, the Huguenots ceased by the middle of the 18th century to maintain a distinct identity, and the knowledge of French disappeared. By the late 1700s the Cape Colony was one of the best developed European settlements outside Europe or the Americas.

== Economy ==
The two pillars of the Cape Colony's economy for almost the entirety of its history were shipping and agriculture. Its strategic position meant that prior to the opening of the Suez Canal in 1869 almost every ship sailing between Europe and Asia stopped off at the colony's capital Cape Town. The supplying of these ships with fresh provisions, fruit, and wine provided a very large market for the surplus produce of the colony.

== Further expansion ==
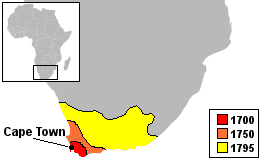
Expansion of the Dutch Cape Colony.

The Cape colonists gradually acquired all of the land of the Khoikhoi to the north and east of their base at Cape Town. Besides those who died in warfare, whole tribes of Khoikhoi were severely disrupted by smallpox epidemics in 1713 and 1755. A few remaining tribes maintained their independence, but the majority of the Khoikhoi took jobs with the colonists as herdsmen. The Dutch East India Company government passed a law in 1787 subjecting the remaining nomadic Khoikhoi to certain restrictions. The direct effect of this law was to make the Khoikhoi even more dependent upon the farmers, or to compel them to migrate northward beyond the colonial border. Those who chose the latter encountered the hostility of their old foes, the San, who inhabited the plains from the Nieuwveld and Sneeuwberg mountains to the Orange River.

== Conflicts with the Dutch East India Company ==
Neither the hostility of the natives, nor the struggle to make agriculture profitable on Karoo or veld, slowed the progress made by the colonists as much as the narrow and tyrannical policy adopted by the Dutch East India Company. The Company stopped the colony's policy of open immigration, monopolised trade, combined the administrative, legislative and judicial powers into one body, told the farmers what crops to grow, demanded a large percentage of every farmer's harvest, and harassed them. This tended to discourage further development of industry and enterprise. From these roots sprung a dislike of orderly government, and libertarian view-point that has characterised the "boers" or Dutch farmers for many generations. Seeking largely to escape the oppression of the Dutch East India Company, the farmers trekked farther and farther from the seat of government. The company, to control these emigrants, established a magistracy at Swellendam in 1745 and another at Graaff Reinet in 1786. The authorities declared the Gamtoos River as the eastern frontier of the colony, but the trekkers soon crossed it. To avoid collision with the bantu tribes advancing south and west from east central Africa, the Dutch agreed in 1780 to make the Great Fish River the boundary of the colony. In 1795 the heavily taxed boers of the frontier districts, who received no protection against the Africans, expelled the officials of the Dutch East India Company, and established independent governments at Swellendam and at Graaff-Reinet.

The Netherlands fell to the French army under the leadership of Napoléon Bonaparte in 1795. Reacting to the weakness of the Dutch East India Company holdings, a British force under Sir James Henry Craig set out for Cape Town to secure the colony for the Stadtholder Prince William V of Orange against the French. The governor of Cape Town refused at first to obey any instructions from the prince, but after Craig threatened to use force, he capitulated. The boers of Graaff Reinet did not surrender until an army had been sent against them, and in 1799 and again in 1801 they rose in revolt. In February 1803, as a result of the Peace of Amiens, the colony came under the control of the Batavian Republic.

== See also ==
- Cape Town history and timeline
- History of South African wine
