= Hendrik Swellengrebel =

8th Governor of the Dutch Cape Colony
- In office 14 April 1739 – 27 February 1751
- Preceded by: Daniël van den Henghel (acting)
- Succeeded by: Ryk Tulbagh

Personal details
- Born: 20 September 1700 Cape Town
- Died: 26 December 1760 (aged 60) Utrecht, Netherlands
- Spouse(s): Helena Wilhelmina ten Damme; Helena van Ruyven

Hendrik Swellengrebel (Cape Town, 20 September 1700 – Utrecht, 26 December 1760) was the first and only Dutch East India Company governor of the Dutch Cape Colony who was born in the Cape.

== Life ==
Swellengrebel was governor from 14 April 1739 to 27 February 1751. In his time, new districts were added to the colony. The town of Swellendam in the Western Cape is named after him and his wife Helena Wilhelmina ten Damme.

In 1751 he was succeeded as governor by Ryk Tulbagh. Upon return to the Netherlands, he bought the land now known as the Kaapse Bossen (Cape Forests) in Utrecht.
