= Kosie =

Kosie is a South African male given name. It is a hypocorism of Jacobus. Notable people with the name include:

- Kosie Marais (1900–1963), South African brandy maker
- Kosie Pretorius (1935–2017), Namibian politician
- Kosie Venter (born 1969), South African cricket player
