= Abraham van der Weijden =

Dutch ship's captain

Personal details
- Born: 1743 Delft, Dutch Republic
- Died: 1773 (aged 29–30) Cape Town, Dutch Cape Colony
- Spouse: Johanna Slegge
- Known for: Ship's captain in The Dutch East India Company and Freemasonry

Abraham van der Weijden, a Dutch citizen, was a ship's captain and the initiator of Freemasony in the Dutch Cape Colony an area now part of South Africa.

== Personal life ==
Van der Weijden was born in Delft, The Netherlands in 1743. He married Johanna Slegge on 29 July 1764. He died in South Africa on 31 January 1773.

== Career ==
He was trained as ship's captain. He started in the service of The Dutch East India Company (DEIC) on 2 October 1768. He joined from the Delft division of the DEIC. Van der Weijden was in charge of the shipped called "Pauw". This was a 140 feet long ship used by the DEIC from 1768 to 1784. The Pauw departed for Batavia on 5 December 1771 and stopped over in Cape Town, South Africa on 24 April 1772. Cape Town was a refreshment station between Europe and Asia, specifically for the ships from the DEIC. On 4 July 1772 the ship reached Batavia.

== Connection with South Africa ==
When van der Weijden arrived in 1772, he stayed over for a few weeks. He had contact with the other personnel of the DEIC stationed at Cape Town. Being a freemason and a member of the Grand Lodge in the Netherlands he set up a meeting to establish a Lodge in South Africa. This meeting took place on 2 May 1772.

== Freemasonry ==
At that meeting in 1772 Lodge de Goede Hoop was established with the first members being, Jacobus Alexander le Febre, Christoffel Brand, Jan Adriaan van Schoor, Abraham Chiron, Johann Conrad Gie, Pieter Soermans, Petrus Johannes de Witt and Olof Godlieb de Wet. Chiron was elected Grand Master. It was established under The Grand Lodge from the Netherlands. Van der Weijden issued a provisional warrant of authority, which was subject to the Netherlands' approval. It was approved by the Grand Master of the Netherlands. In July 1772 van der Weijden established the Lodge La Fidele Sinceritie in Batavia.

== Death ==
In January 1773 van der Weijden and other Ship Captains we invited for lunch by Governor Joachim van Plettenberg. Van der Weijden had a difference of opinion with Carl Phillip Cassel, also a ship's captain. Cassel stabbed him to death and fled to France. He was the recipient of the first Masonic funeral in South Africa.
