= François Renier Duminy =

French mariner, navigator and cartographer

François Duminy

Grand Master of Lodge de Goede Hoop (South African Freemasons)
- In office 1784–1799
- Preceded by: Chiron, A.
- Succeeded by: Truter, J.A.

Personal details
- Born: François Renier Duminy; October 4, 1747 Lorient, France
- Died: May 26, 1811 (aged 63) Cape Town, South Africa
- Spouse: Johanna Margaretha Nöthling
- Children: 5
- Known for: Freemasonry, mariner, navigator, cartographer and pioneer work

François Renier Duminy (Lorient, 4 October 1747 – Cape Town, 26 May 1811) was a French mariner, navigator, cartographer and South African pioneer.

== Birth and French Origins ==
Born in Lorient, France, Duminy was an illegitimate child. According to French naval records, his father was Antoine Duminy, a long-serving member of the French army (born in Tarascon as Antoine Lebre, he adopted the surname Duminy as a nom-de-guerre, became commander of the citadel of Port-Louis, Morbihan and died in Bayonne in 1768 while commanding the citadel there). According to one document, his mother was Anne le Goff, about whom nothing is known.

== Life ==
After a career in the French East India Company, during which he obtained training as a member of the Company's elite officer corps, François Renier Duminy traded independently in the Indian Ocean and, after settling at the Cape, entered the service of the Dutch East India Company (VOC), on whose behalf he completed several voyages to Ceylon (Sri Lanka), India, Madagascar and Delagoa Bay. In 1781 he was sent on a special mission to Europe to report on the VOC's losses during the American War of Independence and, after the capture of his ship by the British, returned as captain of the Meermin, on which during the next 10 years he carried out important survey work of the southern African coastline. He played a leading role in the establishment of Freemasonry in South Africa.

== Early life ==
After a voyage as a supernumeraire on the Vengeur, he was pilot (second ensign) on the Dromadaire (500 tons) which sailed for Mauritius (Ile de France) in 1759. He was again pilot as a junior officer on the Comte de Argenson (1,000 tons) which sailed to Pondichéry (India) in April 1765 and on the Duc de Penthièvre (900 tons), which sailed to Canton (China) in December 1767. His employment as pilot reflects his lasting interest in navigation and his skill in calculating longitude using lunar distances, the method devised by Jean-Baptiste d’Apres de Mannevillette, the Company's cartographer. His journals record his daily calculation of the ship's latitude and longitude.

== The French Marine ==
On his return to Lorient in mid-1769, Duminy left the service of the French East India Company after the French government had allowed private French traders to send ships to the East. He was second-lieutenant on the Gerion (250 tons, 5 cannons), chartered by a group of speculators and commanded by family relative Mathieu Lunel Duminy. It sailed from Lorient for Mauritius in October 1769, returning in May 1771. He was then first-lieutenant on the Ceres (1,000 tons, 3 cannon) on its voyage to Pondichéry (December 1771 - May 1774). His qualification as captain in the French Marine in July 1774 created many lucrative opportunities, not least because ship's captains could carry cargo and sell it for their own profit. He was at first only second captain of the Salomon, of 350 tons and 8 cannon, commanded by Jacques Pierre Bourdé de la Villehuet, an experienced captain who had also left the French East India Company. After conveying passengers to Mauritius and hunting whales off the east coast of Madagascar, a group of uncharted islands was discovered. They are still known as the ‘Salomon Islands’ and are part of the Chagos Group. Duminy left the Salomon to obtain provisions from Reunion in the yacht Heureux and on 22 August assumed command of the Belle Artur, a privately owned snow that sailed from Port Louis (Mauritius) on 15 September 1776. He intended to trade for slaves at Madagascar but, when these were unobtainable, agreed to convey Baron Maurice Benyokswy to Cape Town. Benyowsky was returning to France to defend his ambitious plan to exploit the resources of Madagascar for the French King. His entourage included his wife, his sister-in-law, and thirty slaves; the slaves were sold in Cape Town.

== East African trade ==
On 2 February 1777 Duminy married Johanna, the daughter of Benjamin and Johanna Nöthling, the proprietors of a guest house in the Heerengraght (now Adderley Street) where he had stayed on his return to France on the Ceres four years previously. He intended to continue his trading activities, using Cape Town as his base, and at the end of the year undertook a slaving expedition in the Deodat, a small 130-ton ship, to Ibo Island, where the Portuguese authorities had begun to allow foreigners to trade. In the following year, he undertook a similar expedition on the Sainte Therese (230 tons), which had sailed to Cape Town from Lorient under the command of Bourdé de la Villehuet. He acquired 160 slaves on the first voyage and 257 on the second.

== In the Service of the Dutch East India Company ==
Duminy's trading activities from Cape Town were interrupted by the outbreak of the American War of Independence in mid-1778 because France entered the war in support of the American rebels, with the result that armed conflict soon extended to the Indian Ocean. At the end of 1780, the Dutch Republic also declared war on Britain and Duminy was given the command of the Betsy, a British brig that had escaped the destruction of the British fleet at Yorktown and had been renamed the Postillon, to convey the news to the Company's authorities in India and Ceylon (Sri Lanka). The decision to enter the war proved extremely costly for the Dutch, for they lost most of their shipping and trading bases in the Indian Ocean and, after the arrival of a stricken fleet had brought news of further disasters to Cape Town, it was decided that Duminy would sail to Europe in the Postillon to convey this news to the Dutch East India Company's authorities. The Postillon was however intercepted by a British fleet and Duminy was taken to the West Indies as a prisoner of war after he had thrown his despatches into the sea. Fortunately for him, a truce had just been signed so that he was able to sail to Holland via England as a passenger. In Holland, he was given the command of the Meermin, a newly built frigate (500 tons, 26 guns) and given the task of escorting six company vessels transporting the de Meuron Regiment which was to bolster the Dutch forces in Ceylon.

== The Order of St. Philippe ==
Duminy was admitted to The Order of St Philippe as a Knight Commander and Chevalier Grand Cross when he visited Europe in 1783. This Order had been established in 1768 by Philip Ferdinand, Count of Limburg-Styrum, to raise money to pay for his extravagant lifestyle. It was awarded to prominent individuals, usually after the payment of a fee. Holders of the Chevalier Grand Cross had to prove 20 years of service in the army or navy. It is not known why Duminy should have sought this award or how much he paid for the honour. During his visit to Holland he had in fact declared his inability to repay an earlier debt.

== Slaving in De Meermin ==
The Meermin was to remain at Cape Town for the next 12 years, most of it under Duminy's command. His first instructions from the VOC authorities were to make two visits to Madagascar and Mozambique to purchase slaves during 1784 and 1785. On the first, he obtained 316, 105 of whom died on the return journey, and on the second 345, 50 of whom died. These were the last slaving expeditions conducted from Cape Town by the VOC. It was also Duminy's last involvement in slaving, despite the opportunities that were offered by privatisation at the end of 1792. He was asked to provide guidelines for future expeditions and this he did in December 1786, followed by another document dealing with the mortality of slaves in which he ascribed most of the deaths to diseases which had been contracted before transit.

== Equipage Master and Captain of the Port ==
In March 1786 Duminy was appointed Equipage Master by Governor van de Graaff. In this position he was responsible for provisioning all Dutch East India Company ships and for supervising all shipping activities along the Cape coast. His duties included serving on a commission to report on the export of grain from Mossel Bay and of timber from Plettenberg Bay, as well as charting of the southern Cape coastline which had not been surveyed since Mannevillette's 1752 survey. The appointment was disallowed by the directors of the VOC, supposedly on the grounds that Duminy was French, but Duminy continued his duties of Captain of the Port and also with the survey of the coastline. The brig Duifje (400 tons) was better suited for survey work and coastal sailing and, also captained by Duminy, was stationed at the Cape between 1788 and 1791 to assist in this work. In August 1788 he called at Plettenberg Bay to load the first consignment of timber.

== Charting the Cape Coastline ==
Duminy appears to have produced his first charts of the coastline in 1782 and drew several improved versions during the next 8 years. In 1790 a map showing the coastline as well as a section of the interior was presented to van de Graaff, following a land survey carried out by J.N.Friderici and Josephus Jones. In 1791 Duminy then explored the west coast north of Saldanha Bay to assess the suitability of St Helena Bay as a harbour and, between 1791 and 1792, was sent to Mauritius on board the Meermin to sell a consignment of wheat and obtain coffee and timber. The voyage turned out to be nightmarish, for it ran into a cyclone and smallpox broke out amongst the crew.

== Expedition to Walvis Bay ==
Duminy's last assignment for the Dutch East India Company before his retirement from the sea was to lead an expedition up the West coast as far as Walvis Bay, where it was hoped to link up with an overland expedition led by Willem van Reenen. Surveying the coastline as best he could, he anchored to the north of the island which he named ‘Possession Island’ (the nearby coastline he named ‘Elisabeth Bay’). Proceeding northwards, he visited the bay known by the Portuguese as Angra Pequena, which he renamed ‘Beschermer’s Bay’ (now known as Luderitz) and, after anchoring and going ashore in a bay which he named ‘Rhenius Bay’ (now known as Stormvogelbucht), he sailed on to Walvis Bay. Five beacons were erected at these places to indicate possession by the VOC. Duminy Point, a position of navigational importance, between Saldanha Bay and Cape Columbine, is named after him.

== Last Years ==
After retiring from a life at sea, Duminy looked forward to profiting from farming, taking advantage of the VOC administration's decision to privatise grain and meat production. He built a substantial homestead at Bokkerivier (a quitrent property at Riviersonderend) and acquired Blaauweklip (Kykoedie) and Compagniesdam (a freehold property at Blouberg). These properties were well-suited for timber, fruit-growing and stock and grain farming. In Cape Town he built a large house (le Jardin) on a 2.5-hectare (6.2-acre) plot in Table Valley. His expectations were not to be realised however and the last years of his life were characterised by financial worries and declining health. The main reason for this decline in fortune was the end of the VOC's administration (followed by its bankruptcy) and the occupation of the Cape in 1795 by Britain, following the outbreak of the French Revolutionary Wars. The British occupation put an end to the profitable liaison with Company officials which Duminy and others had enjoyed. Although his fortunes improved during the Batavian administration (1803-6), when he was appointed Harbour Master of Simonstown, he was dismissed after the second British administration.

== Personal life ==
After their marriage in 1777, the family lived in a rented house on Kerkplein, on which the National Mutual Building now stands. During his extended periods at sea, his wife appears to have lived with her mother in the family house on the Heerengracht. Their daughter Jeanne Francoise was born in 1779, followed by one son, Francois Antoine Benjamin (1785) a second daughter Margaretha Victoire (1787) died in infancy . A third daughter, Reinette Wilhelmina, was born in 1789 and a second son Benjamin Jacob Wilhelm (1793). Following his residence at Simonstown between 1803 and 1806, Johanna died of depression in 1807 and Duminy lived in rented properties in Cape Town, visiting his daughter Jeanne who farmed at Bokkerevier and the mineral springs at Caledon, which were believed to provide relief for his gout and arteriosclerosis. He died in Cape Town on 26 May 1811 and was buried in the old Somerset Road cemetery (cleared in 1909 to make way for street development).

== Freemasonry ==
The Freemasonry movement grew prodigiously in France during the eighteenth century. Influenced by the ideas of the Enlightenment, in which Duminy was well-read, many of its members were vociferous champions of republicanism and opponents of the ‘superstition’ which was seen to characterise Western religion. When visiting Europe in 1783, he was confirmed as a Grand Inspector of the Chapter of the Grand Orient and raised to the Rose Croix and Kadosh degrees. On his return to Cape Town, he issued a warrant for the establishment of the Lodge St André d’Afrique, after which the Lodge de Goede Hoop was revived (it had been established in 1772 by a member of the Dutch Masonic movement). Duminy was installed as Grand Master, a position he held until 1799, when he declined re-election. The Lodge de Goede Hoop prospered to the extent that by 1802 an impressive Lodge was built on Stalplein, designed by Louis Thibault, a fellow-Frenchman and freemason. The South African Masonic movement and Duminy's involvement in it was however drastically affected by the British occupation. Admiral Elphinstone and Major-General Craig were both invited to attend the Lodge's meetings but this did not prevent the establishment of a separate English-speaking lodge. A further blow occurred when the Batavian Commissioner J.A. de Mist arrived in 1803. He was the Deputy Grand Master of the Dutch Grand Lodge. Determined to assert his authority, he terminated Duminy's appointment as Inspector-General. After the second British occupation, the Lodge de Goede Hoop was increasingly influenced by the English Masonic movement and became more concerned with social respectability than with the political radicalism that had inspired the American and French Revolutions.

== Introduction of keratolytic winter erythema in South Africa ==
François Renier Duminy introduced keratolytic winter erythema, a rare genetic disease, in South Africa. Even nowadays, its prevalence is much higher among Afrikaaners than any other world population.
