= Cape Dutch =

Historical socioeconomic group of Afrikaners in the Western Cape

Kaapsche Hollanders (Dutch)
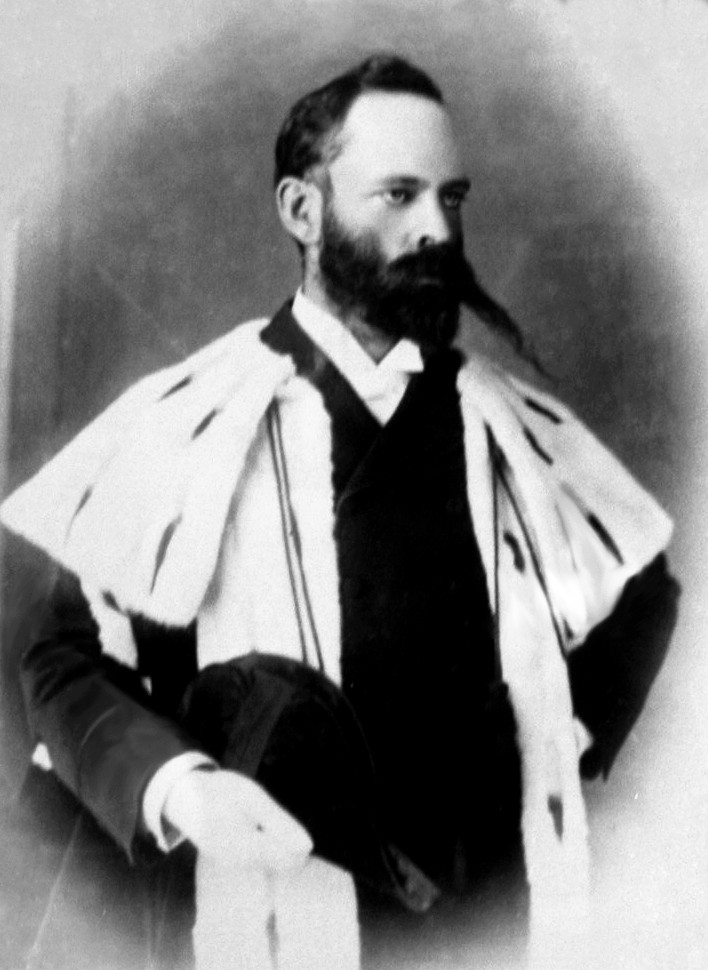
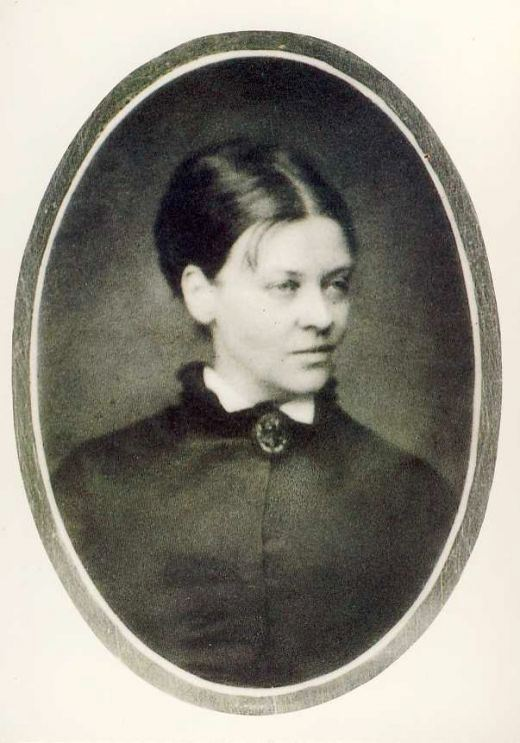
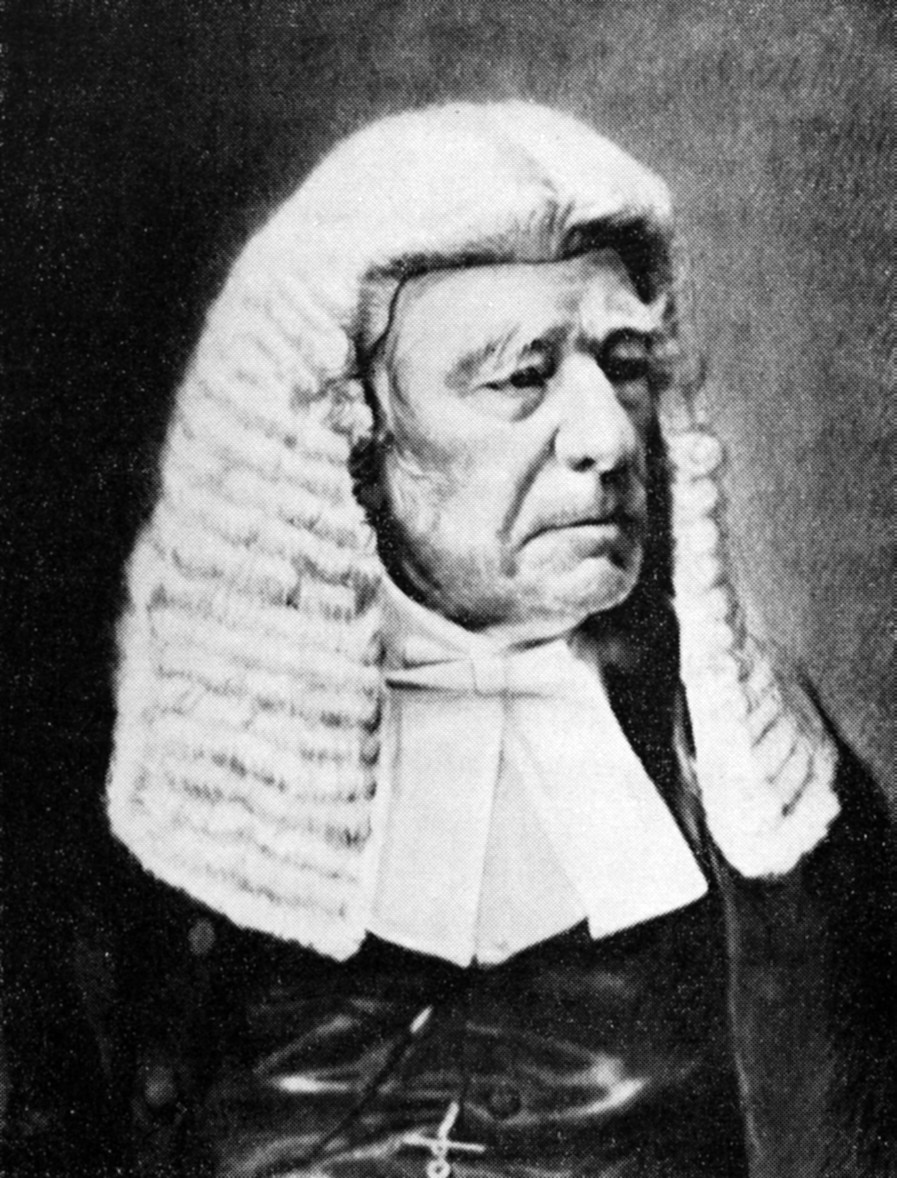
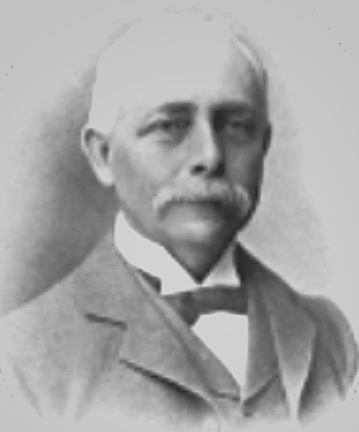
- Left to right: David Graaff, Marie Koopmans-de Wet, Christoffel Brand, John Gilbert Kotzé were all prominent Cape Dutch figures.

Regions with significant populations
- Western Cape: ~250,000 (1899 estimate)

Languages
- Dutch, Afrikaans

Religion
- Calvinism (see Afrikaner Calvinism)

Related ethnic groups
- Boers, Cape Coloureds, Basters, Griquas, Dutch

Cape Dutch, also commonly known as Cape Afrikaners, were a historic socioeconomic class of Afrikaners who lived in the Western Cape during the eighteenth and nineteenth centuries. The terms have been evoked to describe an affluent, educated section of the Cape Colony's Afrikaner population which did not participate in the Great Trek or the subsequent founding of the Boer republics. Today, the Cape Dutch are credited with helping shape and promote a unique Afrikaner cultural identity through their formation of civic associations such as the Afrikaner Bond, and promotion of the Afrikaans language.

== Nomenclature ==
At the onset of British rule in the Cape Colony, the preexisting population of European origin settled during the Dutch era was universally classified by the new colonial government as "Hollanders" or "Dutch". In 1805, a relative majority still represented old Dutch families brought to the Cape during the late seventeenth and early eighteenth centuries; however, close to one-fourth of this demographic group was of German origin and one-sixth, of French Huguenot descent. Nevertheless, to the British authorities they represented a rather homogeneous bloc which could be easily distinguished by their common use of the Dutch language and shared adherence to the Dutch Reformed Church. Among the colonists themselves there had developed a notion of a Boer people; although the term could denote any Dutch-speaking white settler it was usually only the impoverished pastoral farmers on the colony's frontier who applied this concept to themselves and formed a unique subgroup accordingly. In response, British immigrants and officials adopted the informal moniker "Cape Dutch" to distinguish between the better educated, wealthier Dutch speakers concentrated in the Western Cape and the self-styled "Boers", whom they considered ignorant, illiterate, and uncouth. "Cape Dutch" may thus be regarded correctly as an English description rather than any sense of self-concept. When first introduced, the term was not actually used by Dutch-speaking whites in the Western Cape to describe themselves, and the idea of a unique Cape Dutch identity did not find widespread expression until the 1870s. The term's explicit connotation to the Netherlands, and the indiscriminate manner in which it was applied by English speakers, also sparked a revival of interest among colonists of German or French origin in their ancestral roots.

== History ==
Following the establishment of the Dutch East India Company's initial settlement at the Cape of Good Hope in 1652, it became home to a large population of vrijlieden, also known as Free Burghers vrijburgers (free citizens). The earliest free burghers were Company employees who applied for grants of land and permission to retire in South Africa as independent farmers. Most were married Dutch citizens who committed to spend at least twenty years on the African continent. In exchange they received plots of thirteen and a half morgen apiece, a twelve-year exemption from property taxes, and loans of seeds and agricultural implements. Reflecting the multi-national character of the company's workforce and overseas settlements, smaller numbers of German and French Huguenot immigrants were also allowed to settle in South Africa, and by 1691 over a quarter of the Cape's European population was not ethnically Dutch. Nevertheless, there was a degree of cultural assimilation due to intermarriage, and the almost universal adoption of the Dutch language. Cleavages were likelier to occur along socioeconomic rather than ethnic lines; broadly speaking, the Cape colonists were delineated into Boers, poor farmers who settled directly on the frontier, and the more affluent, predominantly urbanised Cape Dutch.

Differences between the Boers and the Cape Dutch increased as a result of the end of Dutch rule and the Great Trek. The Netherlands formally ceded its South African colony to Great Britain around 1815. While most of the Cape Dutch community accepted British rule and embraced the status of British subjects, the Boers remained fiercely independent and felt alienated by the new colonial administration. This culminated in the Great Trek, a mass migration of between 12,000 and 15,000 Boers deep into South Africa's interior to escape British rule. Four-fifths of the Cape Colony's Dutch-speaking white population at the time did not participate in the trek. The Dutch Reformed Church, to which most of the Cape Dutch and Boers belonged, explicitly refused to endorse the Great Trek as well.

Many Cape Dutch regarded the subsequent founding of the Boer republics with suspicion, as they perceived the cause of Boer republican nationalism to be retrogressive. Nevertheless, the Cape Dutch went on to develop their own nationalist movement in the late nineteenth century, which initially promoted cooperation and political alliances with the British. This policy began to dissolve after 1895, when local political leaders sought to distance themselves from Britain's imperial agenda and what they perceived as unwanted interference by English capitalists such as Cecil Rhodes in the legal and constitutional traditions of the colony. Popular affectation for British imperial traditions, culture, and patriotism among the Cape Dutch was rapidly replaced by a more exclusive commitment to a greater Afrikaner nationalism. For his part Rhodes regarded the growth of pan-Afrikaner nationalism as an imminent threat, since a political union between the Boers and Cape Dutch would threaten British primacy in South Africa. He helped perpetuate preexisting rivalries between the two groups to circumvent this possibility.

The outbreak of hostilities between the British government and the Boer republics during the Second Boer War deeply split Cape Dutch society. Boer victories intensified patriotic pan-Afrikaner sentiments among the Cape Dutch. While many fought on the side of the British, an unknown number also defected to the Boer republics. As the Cape Dutch controlled over half the colonial legislature in the Cape Colony at the time, the perceived proliferation of pro-Boer sentiments led to unsuccessful attempts by Governor Lord Milner to disenfranchise them. Milner believed that most Cape Dutch secretly supported the Boer cause, and sought to ensure the local English-speaking population achieved political dominance through excessive gerrymandering. Many of the troops among the enlisted and officer ranks in the British Army shared Milner's suspicions, with one soldier writing a letter explicitly detailing the British soldiers' animosity towards Afrikaners at large: "The Cape Dutch and Boers are a dirty treacherous lot and as soon as the Transvaal is subdued and the beggars trek farther out of our way the better. We do hate them down here like poison." Relatively few returning Cape Dutch fighters were disenfranchised as a result of joining the Boer war effort.

Prior to the Second Boer War, the narrow principles of Boer republicanism and the political alignment many Cape Dutch still held with the British Empire undercut any hopes for pan-Afrikaner unity. However, following the dismantling of the Boer republics, the exodus of many impoverished Boers to the cities, and the subsequent establishment of the Union of South Africa, the Cape Dutch and Boers increasingly formed a unified political bloc and socioeconomic differences between the two groups gradually diminished. The single most decisive factor in encouraging Cape Dutch and Boer unity in the postwar period appears to have been the preservation and promotion of the Afrikaans language.

== Society and politics ==
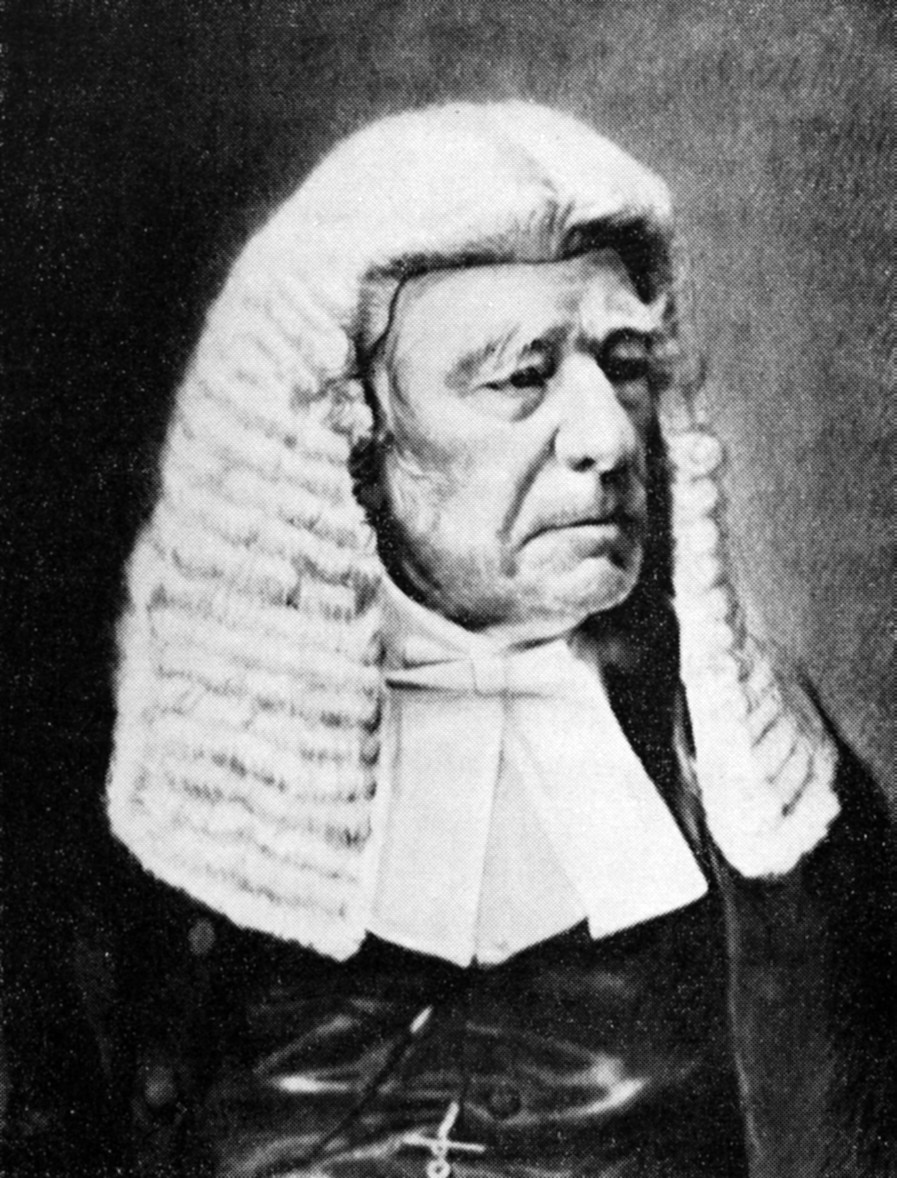
Christoffel Brand, proponent for a Cape Dutch ethnic consciousness

The creation of a distinct Cape Dutch society was closely linked to the evolution of Cape Dutch group identities and Afrikaner nationalism. During the 1830s a small group of professionals in Cape Town made the first concerted attempt to simulate a sense of cultural identity among white Dutch speakers in the Western Cape, based on a shared language and history. This led to the formation of the first true Cape Dutch social institutions, namely the first Dutch university in the colony, the Zuid-Afrikaansche Athenaeum, and periodicals and societies aimed at Dutch speakers. In 1824, a Dutch periodical, the Nederduitsch Zuid-Afrikaansch Tijdschrift, appeared. A society for the promotion of the community's history and the arts was also established, the Maatschappij ter uitbreiding van Beschaving en Letterkunde. Christoffel Brand, son of a former Dutch colonial official and first Speaker of the Parliament of the Cape of Good Hope, was one of the most outspoken proponents for a unique Afrikaner ethnic consciousness. Brand argued that "England has taken from the old colonists of the Cape everything that was dear to them: their country, their laws, their customs, their slaves, their money, yes even their mother tongue...[they] had done everything to prove that they wanted to be British, while their conquerors had continually worked to remind them they were Hollanders". In 1830, De Zuid-Afrikaan was started as a Dutch-language newspaper to counter the dominant influence of English journalism in the Western Cape.

In sharp contrast with the independently minded Boers, the Cape Dutch had no initial objection to the imposition of British rule for several decades, or even with the political domination of British colonists at the Cape. They hoped that the British government could grant preferential tariffs on Cape exports and were grateful for the latter's decision to impose local tariffs on imported wine and other products. For its part the Cape Dutch elite stressed its loyalty to the British Empire and indeed looked for common cause with British immigrants as part of a wider white South African nationality rather than focusing on a narrow Cape colonial identity. Despite this, heavy-handed attempts to assimilate the Cape Dutch into the British way of life, including the adoption of the English language and British customs, aroused resentment. As the Cape Dutch began to embrace their position as a distinct society, concerns mounted that they were becoming estranged from their language and heritage. Opposition mounted toward the perceived campaign to make English the sole official language and give the colony an essentially British identity. The imposition of English in the Cape commerce, judiciary, and its political affairs made English a prerequisite for most professional careers. However, the Cape Dutch made no significant moves to resist until the British abolished the use of Dutch in public education, around 1865. This provoked a storm of outrage by Cape Dutch journalists, teachers, and clergy and alienated the Dutch-speaking intelligentsia. Shortly afterwards the Cape Dutch began to articulate widespread ethnic sentiments for the first time, and explore political strategies based on ethnic mobilisation. This may be regarded as the beginning of militant Afrikaner nationalism in the Cape, as the previously apolitical community began to form movements to defend its traditional values and dogma from anglicisation. Among these was the Genootskap van Regte Afrikaners, established with a sworn determination to stand for "our language, our nation, and our people". This coincided the beginning of a new trend as the Cape Dutch embraced the Afrikaans language for the first time as a symbol of their ethnic and national pride; for example, in 1876, Cape Dutch civic leaders sponsored the publication of the first Afrikaans language newspaper, Die Afrikaanse Patriot. Previously, most Cape Dutch were actually bilingual in both Netherlands Dutch and Afrikaans, although they preferred the former. Afrikaans was seen as a language of servants, illiterate Boers, and nonwhites. The wholehearted embrace and promotion of Afrikaans during the late nineteenth century marked a reversal in this respect, although it did meet some resistance. The Dutch Reformed Church continued to uphold Netherlands Dutch as the language of worship, and Cape intellectuals also ridiculed what they saw as an attempt to elevate the status of a "crude patois".

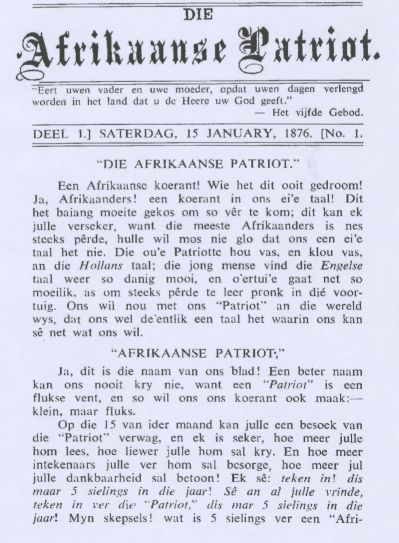
Front page of an issue of the Afrikaanse Patriot

In 1880 Stephanus Jacobus du Toit founded the Afrikaner Bond political party to coordinate activities between the Genootskap van Regte Afrikaners and other civic associations. One of the goals of the Afrikaner Bond was to challenge the preponderance of English-speaking settlers in commerce by establishing their own banks, which then set up education funds for the Afrikaner community and helped Afrikaans-speaking entrepreneurs secure loans. With the renewed Cape Dutch interest in political affairs, their representation in parliament reached parity with English speakers and the Afrikaner Bond's influence grew. Most of the parliamentarians were merchants or financial middlemen, who won their seats not only on the votes of the Cape Dutch, but also Boers in their outlying constituencies who felt indebted to them. Over the next decade, the Afrikaner Bond successfully lobbied for equal recognition of the Dutch language in courts and schools.

The Bond's rhetoric of economic empowerment attracted widespread support from the small but wealthy Cape Dutch landowning gentry, which felt threatened by the growing influence Anglophone farmers were acquiring over aspects of state policy pertaining to agriculture and land use. However, as time went on it focused less on immediate practical concerns such as opposing Anglophone agendas and adopted pan-Afrikaner nationalism and the eventual unification of South Africa under a unitary state as its core principles. The Bond did succeed in unifying Cape Dutch and Boer political agendas when it became amalgamated with Het Volk and the Oranje Unie, the leading parties in the Transvaal and former Orange Free State, respectively, to form the South African Party in 1910. This became the first ruling party of the Union of South Africa and retained power until 1924.

== Demographics ==
The Cape Dutch population was predominantly urban and concentrated around Cape Town and various settlements in the Western Cape's interior. Cape Dutch settlement and migration patterns in the nineteenth century tended to reflect those of British colonists. Unlike the Boers, Cape Dutch emigrants were most likely to settle in other British territories in southern Africa, namely Southern Rhodesia and the Colony of Natal. During the late 1800s smaller numbers found employment in one of the Boer republics, the Orange Free State, where they were in high demand due to their education and technical skills. At one point all the civil servants and teachers residing in the Orange Free State were Dutch expatriates or Cape Dutch. Not all the Boer leaders were receptive to the idea of employing Cape Dutch, whom they regarded as foreigners; for example, Paul Kruger discouraged Cape Dutch immigration to the Transvaal Republic, because he feared they would compete with the Boers for jobs.

Since the Cape Colony's census never differentiated between individual segments of the Dutch- or Afrikaans-speaking white population, the historic size of the Cape Dutch community is almost impossible to accurately calculate. It was estimated at 250,000 people in 1899.
