= Johannes Neethling =

Former Judge of the South African Freemasons

"Lord" Johannes Neethling

Grand Master of Lodge de Goede Hoop (South African Freemasons)
- In office 1813–1831
- Preceded by: de Mist, J.A.U.
- Succeeded by: van Breda, M.

Personal details
- Born: Johannes Henoch Neethling; 1 August 1770
- Died: 4 June 1838 (aged 67)
- Spouse: Anna Catharina Smuts
- Children: None
- Parent(s): Christiaan Ludolph Neethling & Maria Magdalena (Storm) Neethling
- Education: Leiden University
- Known for: Supreme Court judge and Freemasonry

Johannes Henoch Neethling (1770–1838) was a South African Cape Supreme Court Judge and Grand Master of the Freemasons in South Africa.

== Roots and education ==
Neethling was born on 1 August 1770 in Cape Colony. He was the son of Christiaan Ludolph Neethling and Maria Magdalena Neethling Storm. He married Anna Catharina Smuts, daughter of Johannes Coenraad Smuts and Magdalena Elizabeth Wernich. His brother's grandson was named after him. This grandson was a pastor in the Dutch Reformed Church and founder of Paul Roos Gymnasium. His school education was in the Netherlands as his father sent him there for a Christian education. He obtained a PhD in law in 1791 at Leiden University.

== Career in law ==
He practised as an advocate. Neethling was a Judge, firstly of the Court of Justice in 1825. Richard Plasket, the Cape Colonial Secretary in 1825, was not satisfied with the existing Court. A commission of inquiry were set up, which was led by J. T. Bigge and W. M. G. Colebrooke. They suggested a new court system. A Supreme Court was established out of the commission’s recommendations in January 1828. As they were looking for academically well qualified judges, Neethling, who had a PhD in law, was appointed as one of the Supreme Court judges.

== Other activities ==
Apart from practising law, he was joined by D. G. Reitz and C. J. Brand in founding a newspaper, De Zuid-Afrikaan. He was a merchant and a member of the Council of Justice for the Batavian Republic from 1803 to 1806.

== Freemason ==
He started a Lodge called de Hoop named after his father's farm. He was interested in British Freemasonry. He was Grand Master of Lodge de Goede Hoop from 1813 to 1831. He succeeded J. A. U. de Mist as Grand Master, and Michael van Breda succeeded him in 1831.
