= Marie Koopmans-de Wet =

South African Philanthropist

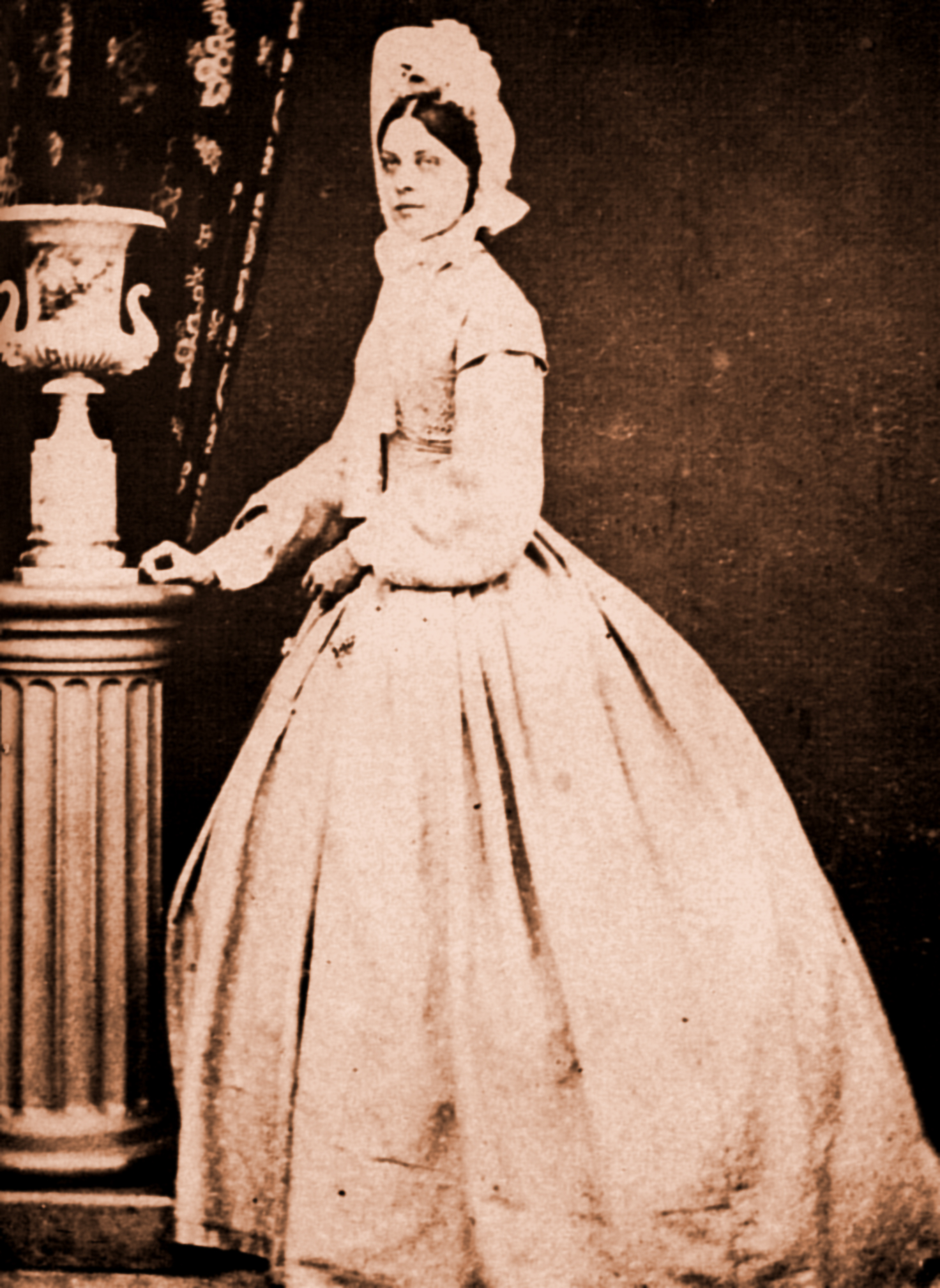
- Born: Maria Margaretha de Wet; 18 March 1834; Koopmans-de Wet House, Cape Town, Cape Colony
- Died: 2 August 1906 (aged 72); Cape Town, Cape Province
- Burial place: Wynberg, Cape Town
- Spouse: Johan Christoffel Koopmans (m. 1864; died 1880)
- Parents: Johannes Augustus de Wet (father); Adriana Dorothea Horak (mother)

Maria Margaretha Koopmans-de Wet (locally /ˈkʊərpmʌnz də ˈvɛt/ KOORP-munz də VET, Afrikaans: [ˈkuəpmans də ˈvɛt]; née de Wet; 18 March 1834 – 2 August 1906) was a campaigner for Afrikaner rights, cultural leader, patriotic benefactor, renowned Cape hostess, patron of the arts and South African philanthropist.

She was the daughter of Johannes de Wet and Adriana Horak and married Johan Christoffel Koopmans. She was an influential member of the Cape Dutch elite in Cape Town. Her house was a center of the colony's high society, frequented by the British governor.

She is known as an activist in favor of the preservation of the Afrikaans language and culture during the period of the British Empire in South Africa.

During the Second Boer War, she worked to improve the conditions of the Boer women and children who had been interned by the British. She attracted the attention of Queen Victoria to the issue, and was herself placed under house arrest because of it.

Her house became the Koopmans-de Wet House Museum.

== Early life ==
She and her sister, Margaretha Jacoba, received an excellent education as children from their father, adv. Johannes de Wet. He also grew up in the now famous storey house at 23 Strand Street, the so-called Koopmans-de Wet House. The land on which the house stands was awarded to Reynier Smedinga in the time of Willem Adriaan van der Stel and the house was erected in 1701. According to tradition, it was a ship captain who built the house and brought the building materials with him on his last voyage from Europe. There is no evidence in the available sources that the famous architect Louis Thibault or sculptor Anton Anreith built the front of the house in its current form around 1795. It is nevertheless a striking example of the strict classical style adapted to the Dutch tradition. After the death of Hendrik Justinus de Wet (her grandfather), his widow bought this house in 1809. The eldest of her three sons, Johannes, later became a lawyer. He was a member of the Cape Legislative Assembly for 15 years after earning a PhD in Roman and French law at the University of Leiden and was active in education, politics and many other spheres of public life in the Cape, such as the struggle for press freedom and the founding of the Zuid-Afrikaansch Athenaeum. Among the many important visitors to 23 Strand Street were people like dr. Abraham Faure (from 1822 to 1867 pastor of the NG congregation in Cape Town), Andries Stockenström (lieutenant-governor of the Eastern Province), John Fairbairn (campaign for freedom of the press, educationalist, financier and politician) and William Porter (attorney-general of the Cape Colony) from 1839 to 1866, after whom Porterville was named). Adv. De Wet's sister was married to Sir John Truter, the first chief justice of the Cape Colony and founder of the NG commune Wynberg. Her mother was Adriana Horak, a granddaughter of Martin Melck, the progenitor of the Melck family in South Africa. As a child, she saw her grandmother Melck being carried with her litter to the front of the Lutheran church, also in Strandstraat, and the whole congregation standing up while the daughter of Martin Melck walked majestically to her place of honor in the church, preceded by a servant who carrying her foot cloth and followed by another who brings her church books. Marie inherited this genteel eminence from her grandmother and it was one of her most enduring characteristics, although her mental gifts were equally exceptional. She also had an exceptionally strong will and decisiveness of action. Her judgment was exceptionally clear and she always had a warm heart for people's affairs.

After she, from the age of seven, attended Johannes Spijker's Dutch school and was taught at home for a time, in her 13th year Marie went to the English private school of Mrs. Midgley went to Bree street and was taught there for about a year and a half, mainly with the aim of learning English. Her father attached great value to the knowledge of foreign languages and later she and her sister were taught German and French at home by a private tutor. Eventually she also learned Italian. At a ripe old age she once translated an article into Dutch that appeared in an Italian news paper about president Paul Kruger. It was published in the local newspaper Ons Land (according to the consulted source, but probably meaning De Zuid-Afrikaan united with Ons Land). All these languages also served her well during her two visits to Europe. She also received instruction in music, painting and needlework, skills that were in vogue at the time as part of a young lady's education. As a young girl she was beautiful and attractive and the portraits show that she had a particularly fine sense of the fashion of the time. But her inner beauty, which radiated from her soft blue eyes and kind smile, testified to her endearing nature.

The Anti-Bandit Movement was a dominant event of her childhood. It was a spontaneous protest in 1849 against the British government's intention to use the Cape as a penal colony for a shipload of convicted criminals, who would be released after serving their sentences. Her biographer and personal friend, sen. F.S. Malan, writes that this movement to save the Cape from the fate of a penal colony "probably contributed more than anything else to the awakening of a feeling of patriotism in the heart of Marie". From an early age she followed her father's leading role in all his activities, for example the movement to obtain a parliamentary Constitution for the Cape Colony. This was especially so because their residence was the center of numerous gatherings on important country matters. She also followed with interest the fortunes of the Voortrekkers and the recognition of the independence of the Transvaal Boers in 1852 and the Orange Free State in 1854. This brought about a national awareness in the mind of the young girl with a powerful personality and in time she became known for her strong patriotic insights. In later years she would sacrifice her health to a self-imposed task of mercy to repackage and send the gifts and comforts that poured into the country for the benefit of the women and children in the concentration camps during the Anglo-Boer War as well as the prisoners of war at St. Helena, Ceylon and elsewhere, when Marie was already elderly.

== Marriage ==
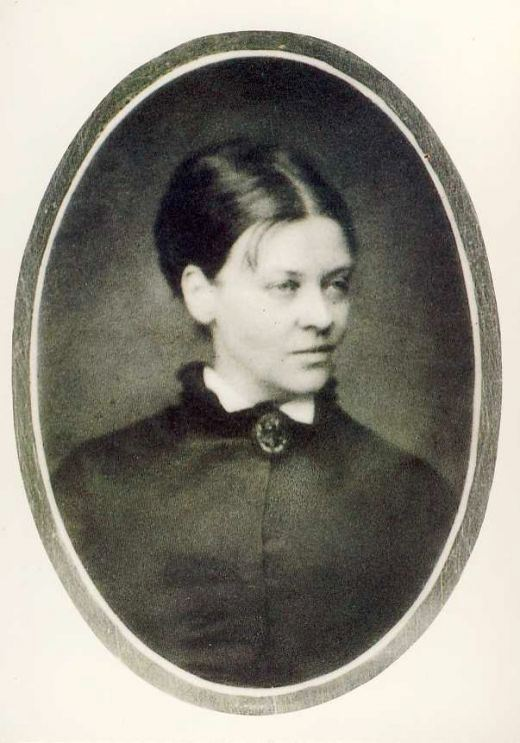
Marie circa 1865.

On 15 March 1864 she married Johan Christoffel Koopmans, a Dutchman by birth and initially an officer in the British-German Legion under the command of Baron Richard von Stutterheim (after whom the Eastern Cape town of Stutterheim was named) on the eastern border of the colony. He came with a letter of recommendation from a friend of adv. De Wet in Holland arrived at the storey residence in Strand street. He had offensive manners, a sociable disposition and a nimbleness of action. The governor, Sir George Grey, offered him the position of foreign correspondent clerk in the head post office because he was fluent in six European languages, and the young couple went to live in Waal Street, but when Koopmans' post was cut as an austerity measure during the depression of 1867 abolished, they returned to her parents' home. It was also because they were childless and Marie's mother's health began to decline. After eight months, however, he was appointed as official guard (Carrier of the Black Rod) in the Cape Legislative Assembly. Soon after, Marie's mother died, after which the care of the household passed to the unmarried Margaretha; and on 15 June 1875 also her father. Only four years later, in 1879, her beloved husband also died (of kidney disease), a blow she never quite got over, as evidenced by the fact that she never took off her mourning clothes again. She and her sister continued to live in their parents' house in Strand Street and, although not wealthy, were able to maintain their social status. In 1881, they undertook a trip to several European countries and got to know the relatives of her late husband, among whom the later editor of Die Volkstem dr. Frans Engelenburg. On this trip she moved in prominent circles and was even received at the court of King Willem III of the Netherlands. When he died a few years later, she wrote a personal letter of condolence to Queen Emma and sent a beautiful wreath. Their trip to Europe brought great inner renewal to the sisters, because upon their return to the Cape, the two sisters adjusted their way of life more generously. After a second visit to Europe, it became clear to them that they must end their isolated existence and once again, like in the old days, welcome guests into their home. With time, their home became known as the Strand street saloon because of the charm and sparkling mental abilities of the hostess. She collected art objects and aimed to honor the Cape Dutch traditions in a stately way. That is precisely why she received strangers, especially Englishmen, to make it clear that magnanimity is an inherent character trait of her people. In the area of culture, she created an opportunity in their home for young people of both English and Dutch descent to organize a series of chamber performances with music.

== Known Friends ==
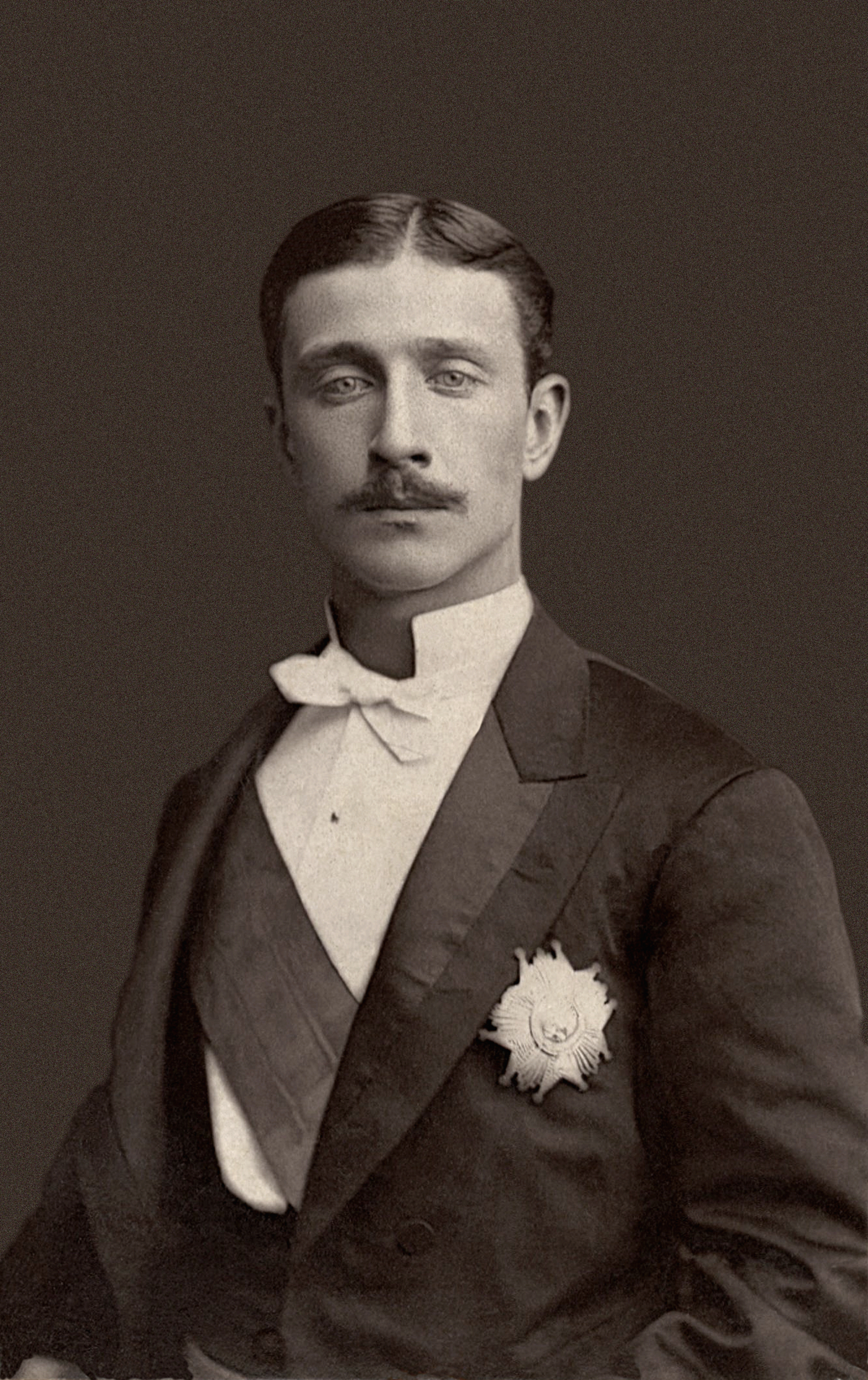
The Prince, shortly before visiting the Koopmans at the Cape Colony.

In her parents' home, she was constantly in contact with prominent Cape figures, such as Sir John Truter, her uncle. Louis-Napoléon, Prince Imperial, son of Napoleon III and Empress Eugenie, stayed with Marie during his short visit at the Cape on his way to Zululand. When he died so suddenly, Marie sent a touching letter to the empress on behalf of the women and mothers of the Cape to express their condolences to her. In the political field, she knew statesmen such as Sir Henry Bartle Frere and Cecil John Rhodes. The latter once said of her: "I fear her more than the entire Afrikanerbond". However, the events in the Transvaal during the Jameson invasion put an end to the visits of Rhodes to the Koopmans-de Wet house. Through friends he tried to get an opportunity to give her an account of the invasion, but she replied, "Let Mr. Rhodes make the account he wants to give me on a public platform." Jan Hendrik Hofmeyr was a personal friend of the sisters, as were the Boer presidents Johannes Brand, F.W. Reitz, Paul Kruger and M.T. Steyn. Later also comes. F.S. Malan, Marie's biographer, at the time. In time, her house was referred to as the lobby of the Afrikanerbond. She also advocated the establishment of the Afrikaans Christian Women's Association (A.C.V.V.), but later withdrew from it because her wish that all women should be involved, including Roman Catholic women, was not accepted. Her stance testified to magnanimity: "Christianity does not exclude, but includes. No matter how far we go through formulas or human explanations, in the Bible we are united again."

== Preservation ==
Marie did much for the preservation of South African antiquities and historic buildings and carried out a task of the same nature as was later carried out by the Historical Monuments Commission and the Council for National Monuments. She campaigned for public ownership, encouraged tree planting and encouraged the protection of native flora and the preservation of antiquities and historical documents. When the Castle of Good Hope was threatened with demolition in 1886 and with violation in 1888, she stepped into the breach for it. Marie and others immediately protested against the former scheme and she even contacted influential friends in England and enlisted their help. The latter scheme was set in motion to supposedly improve and beautify the Castle. Cecil John Rhodes, who was prime minister at the time, sent a copy of the scheme to Marie to get her opinion on the matter. In her reply she stated unequivocally that the beautification would deface the Castle. Another time Rhodes was about to approach her over the Castle, when the authorities wanted to take away a point for the sake of the route of an electric tram. He sent his secretary to her and she (the secretary) received the following answer, "Tell Mr. Rhodes his nose is also just a tip of his face. Let him cut it off and then look in the mirror." That answer had the desired effect.

== Promotion of the Dutch Language ==
One of her greatest interests was the promotion of the Dutch language which, after it had been shut out of public life for about half a century thanks to Governor Lord Charles Somerset's policy, was again allowed alongside English in parliamentary debates in 1882. In 1883 she offered a book prize for Dutch at the South African College and also for successful candidates in the language bondexams. With the founding of the Zuid-Afrikaansche language bond in 1890, she became a member of the executive board. Before the Language Monument was unveiled in Burgersdorp in 1893, she embroidered on a banner the words "Long live our language" and sent a gold medal with the words "De Hollandsche taal in Zuid-Afrika, 1806–1893. Ik worstel maar bezwijk niet". In 1903 she was one of the founders of the monthly magazine De Goede Hoop, for which she came up with the name. She also had a generous heart for education and together with her sister founded the De Wetfonds for the education of two godsons and another for the training of young girls, always so that they will devote themselves to a thorough knowledge of Dutch. There were also the De Wet donations from which the Victoria College in Stellenbosch and the South African College in Cape Town would benefit.

== The Anglo-Boer War ==
Koopmans-de Wet's greatest and most important work was in the interests of the women and children in the concentration camps of the Anglo-Boer War and on behalf of the Boer republics as a whole. She was constantly up-to-date on matters concerning the Republics and at the time was the deputation of President Paul Kruger and received General Piet Joubert at her home on his way to England. When Olive Schreiner published her pamphlet with the passionate appeal for justice and peace, Marie sent a copy of it to a friend in London with the request that she send it to Queen Victoria. Deep was her indignation when she learned that only the responsible minister could bring publications of a political nature to the queen's attention. After this, Marie took the lead in protesting about the conditions in the Boer republics and also regarding the Boer prisoners of war. She drew up a peace petition with 16,750 signatures to be presented to Queen Victoria, requesting that a peaceful solution between Britain and the Zuid-Afrikaansche Republiek be found. In 1900, two large women's meetings were held to protest against the burning down of Boer dwellings and other damage caused during the War. She also had petitions signed to request that Boer War prisoners would not be sent away, but without success. At that time, committees all over Europe got to work to send clothes and food for the women and prisoners of war. Until 1904, more than two thousand boxes of goods from all directions mostly arrived at the Koopmans-de Wet House. She and her sister received all these donations to their front house, opened them and then sent the contents off to different camps. The large sum of money that Marie received, she administered and kept track of herself. She also handled the correspondence related to this work herself. During this time, her freedom of movement was restricted, but later the ban, which amounted to house arrest, was lifted again. In any case, she was so busy that she hardly noticed. But her health, which was never the best, weakened under these multiple activities and she died in August 1906. Margaretha, her sister, died in 1911.

== Death ==
On 13 November 1905, as she already realized that her death was near, she requested that no tributes be paid at her grave and no flowers or wreaths be placed on her grave. “God alleen weet hoe gering mijn beste pogingen waren … Mijn volk heb ik lief gehad en getracht voor te leven.” Two days after Marie's death, on 4 August 1906, she was solemnly discharged from the death house, where professor Adriaan Moorrees gave the speech, brought to the Wynberg churchyard where she was buried next to her parents and her husband. Her funeral was a special event. Former President M.T. Steyn delivered the eulogy at the funeral service, led by professor Adriaan Moorrees from the Seminary in Stellenbosch, while the speech at the grave by prof. J.I. Marais was delivered. F.S. Malan referred to her as "Vorstin haar volks". Olive Schreiner described her as “a woman of exceptional intellectual ability, one who knew no fear or distress, even during the painful oppression of war. She will be remembered now and in the future by all political groups and all races for her fearless personality." General Louis Botha honored her "for her deeds, from which philanthropy and patriotism speak warmly and deeply", and general Jan Smuts labeled her as "an inspiring figure in Afrikaans in the Cape Colony". In a telegram to her nephew, Dr. Frans Engelenburg, Smuts testified about her as follows: “Wie die haar gekent heeft, kan haar nooit vergeten! – De tedere sympathie in alle leed, dit milde hand in alle nooddrift, zo wel bekend aan Transvaalsche weduween en wezen, dat warme hart voor al wat schoon en edel was, die hartstochtelijke liefde het Afrikaansche volk, die heldenmoed, welke in dagen van storm en gevaar – toe zelfs rotzen wankelden – de Afrikaanssche vlag omhoog hielt aan Tafelbergs voet.”
