= Speaker of the National Assembly of South Africa =

Presiding officer of the lower house of the Parliament of South Africa

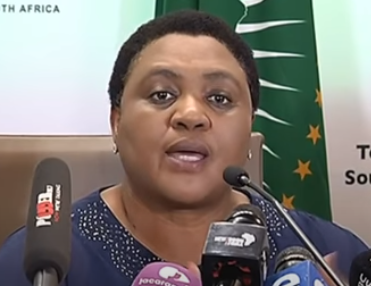
- Incumbent; Thoko Didiza since 14 June 2024
- National Assembly of South Africa
- Style: Honorable Speaker
- Type: Presiding officer of one chamber in a bicameral legislature
- Residence: Cape Town
- Appointer: Elected by members of the National Assembly
- Formation: 1854
- First holder: Christoffel Brand
- Deputy: Deputy Speaker of the National Assembly; Annelie Lotriet
- Salary: R3,164‚654.00 a year
- Website: Official website

The speaker of the National Assembly presides over the National Assembly of South Africa, the lower house of the Parliament of South Africa.

The office of speaker of the National Assembly was preceded by the offices of speaker of the House of Assembly (1910–1984) under the 1909 and 1961 constitutions and speaker of Parliament under the Tricameral Parliament (1984–1994).

== Background ==
The speaker is chosen from among the members of the Assembly at its first sitting following a general election and whenever the office is vacant. The speaker acts as a "referee", taking charge of debates to make sure that the MPs can participate freely while keeping to the rules. The speaker also has managerial duties to ensure that Parliament runs smoothly. Each political party in the Assembly elects a chief whip to run its affairs. The presiding officers, the chief whips, and the leader of government business (the person appointed by the Cabinet to liaise with Parliament) together decide on the programme of work.

=== Selection ===
The speaker of the National Assembly is elected to and removed from office in terms of S52 of the Constitution. In terms of this section the:

- House must elect the speaker from its members during the first House sitting
- The house may remove the speaker by resolution
- The house must fill the position when it becomes vacant during term
- Chief Justice must preside over the election of the speaker

=== Mandate ===
The speaker's mandate is twofold. It is constitutional and institutional. This mandate is furthermore dual at the National Assembly and Parliamentary level. In both situations, it involves interacting with the following sectors of the global community:

- International
- Continental
- Regional
- National

== List of speakers (1854–present) ==
=== Cape House of Assembly (1854–1910) ===
No.	Name (Birth–Death)	Portrait	Term of office
1	Sir Christoffel Brand (1797–1875)		1854–1873
2	Sir David Tennant (1829–1905)		1874–1895
3	Sir Henry Juta (1875–1930)		1896–1898
4	Sir Bisset Berry (1839–1922)		1899–1907
5	James Tennant Molteno (1865–1936)		1907–1910

=== House of Assembly (1910–1994) ===
No.	Portrait	Name (Birth–Death)	Term of office			Political party
No.	Portrait	Name (Birth–Death)	Took office	Left office	Time in office	Political party
1		Sir James Tennant Molteno (1865–1936)	1 November 1910	18 November 1915	5 years, 17 days	South African Party
2		Joel Krige (1866–1933)	19 November 1915	24 July 1924	8 years, 248 days	South African Party
3		Ernest George Jansen (1881–1959)	25 July 1924	19 June 1929	4 years, 329 days	National Party
4		Jan Hendrik Hofmeyr de Waal (1871–1937)	19 July 1929	25 May 1933	3 years, 310 days	National Party
(3)		Ernest George Jansen (1881–1959)	26 May 1933	21 January 1944	10 years, 240 days	National Party (until 1934)
		Ernest George Jansen (1881–1959)	26 May 1933	21 January 1944	10 years, 240 days	United Party (from 1934)
5		Clifford Meyer van Coller (1876–1977)	22 January 1944	5 August 1948	4 years, 196 days	United Party
6		Jozua François Naudé (1889–1969)	6 August 1948	7 November 1950	2 years, 93 days	National Party
7		Johannes Conradie (1897–1966)	19 January 1951	31 December 1960	9 years, 347 days	National Party
8		Henning Johannes Klopper (1895–1985)	20 January 1961	1 August 1974	13 years, 193 days	National Party
9		Alwyn Schlebusch (1917–2008)	2 August 1974	25 January 1976	1 year, 176 days	National Party
10		Jannie Loots (1914–1998)	26 January 1976	30 July 1981	5 years, 186 days	National Party
11		J. P. du Toit	31 July 1981	13 February 1983	1 year, 197 days	National Party
12		Johan Greeff (1921–2004)	14 February 1983	31 December 1986	3 years, 320 days	National Party
13		Louis le Grange (1928–1991)	1 January 1987	25 October 1991 (Died in office)	4 years, 297 days	National Party
14		Gene Louw (1931–2015)	14 November 1991	9 May 1994	2 years, 176 days	National Party

=== National Assembly (1994–present) ===
No.	Portrait	Name (Birth–Death)	Term of office			Political party
No.	Portrait	Name (Birth–Death)	Took office	Left office	Time in office	Political party
1		Frene Ginwala (1932–2023)	9 May 1994	12 July 2004	10 years, 64 days	African National Congress
2		Baleka Mbete (born 1949)	12 July 2004	25 September 2008	4 years, 75 days	African National Congress
3		Gwen Mahlangu-Nkabinde (born 1955)	25 September 2008	6 May 2009	223 days	African National Congress
4		Max Sisulu (born 1945)	6 May 2009	21 May 2014	5 years, 15 days	African National Congress
(2)		Baleka Mbete (born 1949)	21 May 2014	22 May 2019	5 years, 1 day	African National Congress
5		Thandi Modise (born 1959)	22 May 2019	5 August 2021	2 years, 75 days	African National Congress
6		Nosiviwe Mapisa-Nqakula (born 1956)	19 August 2021	3 April 2024	2 years, 228 days	African National Congress
7		Thoko Didiza (born 1965)	14 June 2024	Incumbent	2 years, 86 days	African National Congress

== See also ==
- Parliament of the Cape of Good Hope
- House of Assembly (South Africa)
- Tricameral Parliament
- National Assembly (South Africa)
