= Freemasonry in South Africa =

Freemasonry was brought to South Africa by members of the Grand Orient of the Netherlands in 1772. Today there are lodges chartered under the United Grand Lodge of England, the Grand Lodge of Scotland, the Grand Lodge of Ireland, the Grand Lodge of South Africa, as well as Le Droit Humain.

== Early colonial period ==
On 24 April 1772, Abraham van der Weijden, Deputy Grandmaster Abroad under the Grand Orient of the Netherlands, arrived in the Cape of Good Hope. He issued a warrant allowing for the founding of a lodge, "De Goede Hoop", ten days after arriving, which was ratified by the Grand Orient on 1 September 1772. The founding members of Lodge de Goede Hoop were Abraham Chiron, Jacobus le Febre, Johann Gie, Pieter Soermans, Christoffel Brand, Jan van Schoor, Olof de Wet, and Petrus de Wit.

While in 1774 the first two native-born candidates were initiated into freemasonry, the lodge failed to gain a foothold among the local population, and was dependent on visitors, which led to the Lodge becoming dormant in 1781 until it was revived in 1794, when more local residents were attracted to the fraternity, such as J. A. Truter, who was Chief Justice.

In 1795, the British occupied the Cape, bringing with them military Lodges, but no new lodges were established in Cape colony during this time.

== British rule ==
Another lodge was formed in 1800 by the Dutch called "De Goede Trouw" Lodge, and in 1802 Jacob de Mist arrived from the Netherlands and was installed as the first Deputy Grand Master National in South Africa.

The Napoleonic Wars brought a second British invasion of South Africa. With the beginning of British rule over the region, Dutch lodges saw an increase in members of English origin. Tensions arose between the British masons and their Dutch speaking counterparts, leading the English masons to form their own lodge in the Cape under the Moderns' Grand Lodge of England in 1811, "British" Lodge. The Antients established a rival lodge, "Cape of Good Hope", the following year in 1812.

The British and Dutch freemasons started to work together and became one. The advocate CJ Brand (He was a grandson of one of the founders of freemasonry in South Africa), the first Mayor of Cape Town, M. van Breda and the Master of the Supreme Court, J.H. Hofmeyer, were some of the prominent Grand Masters through the early years. C.C. Silberbauer was Grand Master in the times when the organization in South Africa, had financial problems. T.N. Cranstoun-Day (from the British side) was adamant that lodge stayed pure English. Cranstown-Day could not speak Afrikaans.

== Grand Lodge of South Africa ==
It was formed independently from the Netherlands and the UK. Under Colonel C.G. Botha it was established on 22 April 1961. Botha was named Grand Master. The motto of the Southern Africa Grand Lodge is: "Deo et Collegio". It is Latin for "God and Order" In November 1977, the Lodge admitted non-white members for the first time, as the South African Freemasons, previously were exclusively a white organization.

== The International Order of Freemasonry for Men and Women Le Droit Humain South African Federation ==
Le Droit Humain first lodge in South Africa was founded in 1914 in Durban. South African Lodges were administered by the British Federation of the order until 1995 when the South Africa Federation was founded.

== Grand Masters ==
Year term started	Year term ended	Surname	Name(s)	Date of birth	Date of death	Reference
1804	1813	de Mist	Jacobus Abraham Uitenhage	20 April 1747	3 August 1823	
1813	1831	Neethling	Johannes Henoch	1 August 1770	4 June 1838	
1831	1837	van Breda	Michiel	12 August 1775	12 August 1847	
1837	1874	Brand	Christoffel Joseph	24 June 1797	19 May 1875	
1874	1893	Hofmeyr	Jan Hendrik	19 December 1818	25 April 1893	
1893	1897	Faure	David Pieter	11 November 1842	17 August 1916	
1897	1903	Lewis	Charles Edwardes	5 December 1855	13 January 1945	
1903	1944	Silberbauer	Conrad Christian	23 September 1863	21 July 1944	
1944	1957	Rose	John George	11 January 1876	18 February 1973	
1957	1966	Botha	Colin Graham	15 August 1883	1 February 1973	
1966	1973	Conradie	Eddie			
1973	1983	Gasson	Sydney Richard	16 December 1927	20 March 2013	
1983	1991	Groenewald	Cornelius Botha	24 June 1922	30 May 2009	
1991	1997	Bauser	Reunert Sidney	25 December 1928	28 December 2017	
1997	2003	Lindeque	Barend Gerhardus	5 November 1940	10 April 2015	
2003	2008	Bowen	John Thomas	7 November 1935	26 November 2013	
2008	2014	Watson	Armiston	26 November 1944	12 October 2014	
2014	2017	Edwards	Geoffrey Robert	1945		
2017	2020	Duncan	David James	30 September 1944		
2020	2023	Smith	John Ewald Henry	14 November 1955		
2023	present	Place	Godfrey Stuart	25 June 1957		

Note: Until 1961 the Grand Masters were called Deputy Grand Masters, because it was either part of the Netherlands Lodge. There was close cooperation with Thomas Nathaniel Cranstoun-Day from the British Freemasons during the years up to 1961.

== Notable South African Freemasons ==
- P.J. Blignaut - Government Secretary of the Orange Free State
- J.H. Brand - 4th State President of the Orange Free State
- L. Botha - 1st Prime Minister of South Africa
- T.F. Burgers - 4th President of the South African Republic
- P.A. Cronje - South African General
- P.J. Joubert - South African General
- J.C. Laas - Organizer of the Ossewabrandwag
- C.J. Langenhoven - South African poet
- J.P. Marais - Founder and maker of Klipdrift Brandy
- G.L.P. Moerdijk - Afrikaans architect, best known for the Voortrekker Monument
- H.F. Oppenheimer - South African businessman
- M.W. Pretorius - First president of the South African Republic
- G.S. Preller - South African journalist
- F.W. Reitz - 5th State President of the Orange Free State
- T.J.deV. Roos - South African politician
- W.P. Steenkamp - Clergyman that erected churches in Namakwaland
- D.J.S. Theron - Boer Army military leader
- J.H. de Villiers - First Chief Justice of the Union of South Africa
- A.G. Visser - Afrikaans poet
