= De Zuid-Afrikaan =

Newspaper in the Cape Colony published 1830-1930

- Type: Changed over time
- Founder: Christoffel Brand
- Founded: April 9, 1830
- Ceased publication: 1930
- Political alignment: Afrikaner Bond
- Language: Dutch
- Headquarters: Cape Town

De Zuid-Afrikaan was a nineteenth-century Dutch language newspaper based in Cape Town that circulated throughout the Cape Colony, published between 1830 and 1930.

The paper was founded by the advocate Christoffel Johan Brand on 9 April 1830 and played a major role in providing a mouthpiece for the more educated sections of the Cape Dutch community. Carl Juta, founder of Juta publishers in Cape Town, and brother-in-law of Karl Marx, printed De Zuid Afrikaan. Marx wrote begging letters to Juta and in return Juta asked him to write articles for De Zuid Afrikaan. These letters are to be seen in the history files of Juta and Co. In 1930 the paper finally succumbed to falling circulation figures resulting from the popularity of the Afrikaans language paper, Die Burger.

== Context ==
The Dutch established a settlement in the Cape Colony in 1652. By the start of the Napoleonic Wars the colony was about twice the size of the current South African province of the Western Cape with a white population of some 15,500 and a slave population of 17,000. The descendants of the slave population, mainly of Malay extraction, are today part of the Cape Coloured community. During the first century of the European settlement, migration eastwards into what is today the South African province of the Eastern Cape progressed relatively unhindered. Towards the end of the eighteenth century European migration eastwards met with a south-western migration of the Bantu peoples, notably the Xhosa. Friction between the two groups resulted in what has become known as the Xhosa wars, a series of nine wars from 1779 to 1879.

During the Napoleonic Wars the colony was captured by Britain, and British control was confirmed in 1815 by the Congress of Vienna at the Treaty of Paris. After the Napoleonic Wars, large numbers of British settlers arrived in the Cape, amongst others the 1820 Settlers who, numbering some 5,000 people, were settled in the eastern parts of the colony to provide better protection against the Xhosa. Shortly after the newspaper's foundation many Dutch farmers, especially from the eastern part of the colony, dissatisfied with British rule, trekked into the interior where they set up their own republics - the Orange Free State and the South African Republic. Friction between the British authorities and the Boer republics (as they were called) escalated into the First Boer War of 1880-1881 and the Second Boer War of 1899-1902.

== Establishment ==
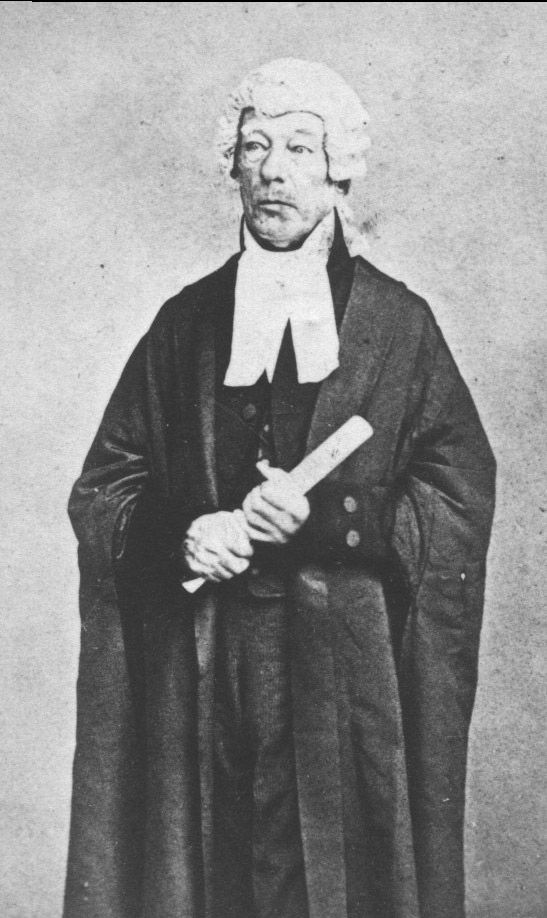
Christoffel Johan Brand, first owner and second editor of De Zuid-Afrikaan

With the arrival of the 1820 settlers, Thomas Pringle and Abraham Faure were granted permission to produce a monthly newspaper, alternately in English and in Dutch. Pringle was outspoken about the harsh conditions of the 1820 settlers and the governor, Lord Charles Somerset effectively expelled the printer Grieg from the colony. The case was taken to the British Government and in 1828 the Colonial Secretary, Sir George Murray granted the Cape Colony the same freedom of the press as existed in England.

The newly won freedom of the press resulted in a number of newssheets being published. On 9 April 1830, an advocate Christoffel Johan Brand together with DG Reitz and JH Neethling established De Zuid-Afrikaan to promote the interests of the Cape Dutch community. The first editor was Charles Etienne Boniface, whose family had fled France during the French Revolution and who, as a sea cadet, had arrived in the Cape Colony on board a British warship.

Brand himself became editor of De Zuid-Afrikaan in 1839. Through his columns, he first opposed the emancipation of slavery on account of the large numbers of loans, estimated at £400,000 that has been taken out by white farmers who used slaves as collateral. Once the abolition laws had been passed, the paper campaigned for appropriate compensation to enable former slave-owners to pay their debts.

Although the paper lobbied against British colonial policies its editors noted had little support, including for example warning the colonial government not to introduce unpopular taxes, it nevertheless saw British rule as "synonymous with civilized progress and order". The paper also played a large role in ensuring that common law on South Africa was based on Roman-Dutch Law rather than English Law. The newspaper lobbied for parliamentary representation within the colony and in 1853 Brand later became the first speaker in the Cape Parliament.

== Mid-century ==
During the middle of the nineteenth century De Zuid-Afrikaan continued to play a central role in the affairs of the Cape-Dutch. The differences between De Zuid-Afrikaan and its English-language rival, The South African Commercial Advertiser were highlighted during the 200th anniversary of the landing of van Riebeeck at the Cape (6 April 1852). While an editorial in the Advertiser extolled the variety of races and creeds in the Cape, all of whom acknowledged the authority of a common [British] Sovereign, De Zuid-Afrikaan merely commended Faure's sermon in which he gave thanksgiving for the sanctioning of a Christian [Reformed] Church in South Africa.

== Hofmeyr ==
In 1871 Jan Hendrik Hofmeyr, who had been editor of De Volksvriend became editor of De Zuid-Afrikaan, a post that he held until 1904. One of Hofmeyr's first acts was to merge the two publications into one.

During the early 1870s, Arnoldus Pannevis and CP Hoogenhout, via letters to De Zuid-Afrikaan argued the need to translate the Bible into Afrikaans for the benefit of the coloured community and the poorer section of the Cape Dutch community who spoke a local patois rather than Dutch. In 1875 SJ du Toit used these sentiments to launch the Genootskap van Regte Afrikaners (GRA) (Association of True Afrikaners) and his Afrikaans language newspaper Die Patriot. Hofmeyr allowed the presses of De Zuid-Afrikaan to be used for the early editions of Die Patriot even though De Zuid-Afrikaaner, being the voice of the better-educated, dismissed Die Patriot as a "common enemy of civilization".

== The final years ==
In common with other Dutch and Afrikaans newspapers, Ons Land supported the former Boer general Botha who became prime minister of the newly formed Union of South Africa in 1910. When Hertzog broke with Botha in 1912 and in January 1914 formed the National Party the Dutch and Afrikaans press remained loyal to Botha. In 1915 three new pro-Hertzog Dutch language newspapers were established in South Africa - De Burger under the editorship of DF Malan in Cape Town, Die Volksbald in Bloemfontein and Die Vaderland in Pretoria. The Tweede Taalbeweging (second language movement) had started almost as soon as Hofmeyr stepped down as editor and in 1922 De Burger adopted the Afrikaans name Die Burger.

By 1930 Ons Land, which faced strong competition for Die Burger was no longer financially viable—its last issue appeared on 9 April of that year. Die Burger, in an editorial, declared that the demise of One Land was due to the paper slavishly following the line of its party leaders and neglecting the culture and language of the Afrikaner people.

== Editors ==
1834	–1834	Charles Etienne Boniface
1834	–1834	JR Stapleton
?	–1839	PA Brand
1839	– ?	Christoffel Johan Brand
1870	–1904	Jan Hendrik Hofmeyr
?	–1930	JPL Volsteedt
