= Jan Willem Janssens =

Dutch military officer, colonial administrator and statesman (1762–1838)

Jonkheer Jan Willem Janssens GCMWO
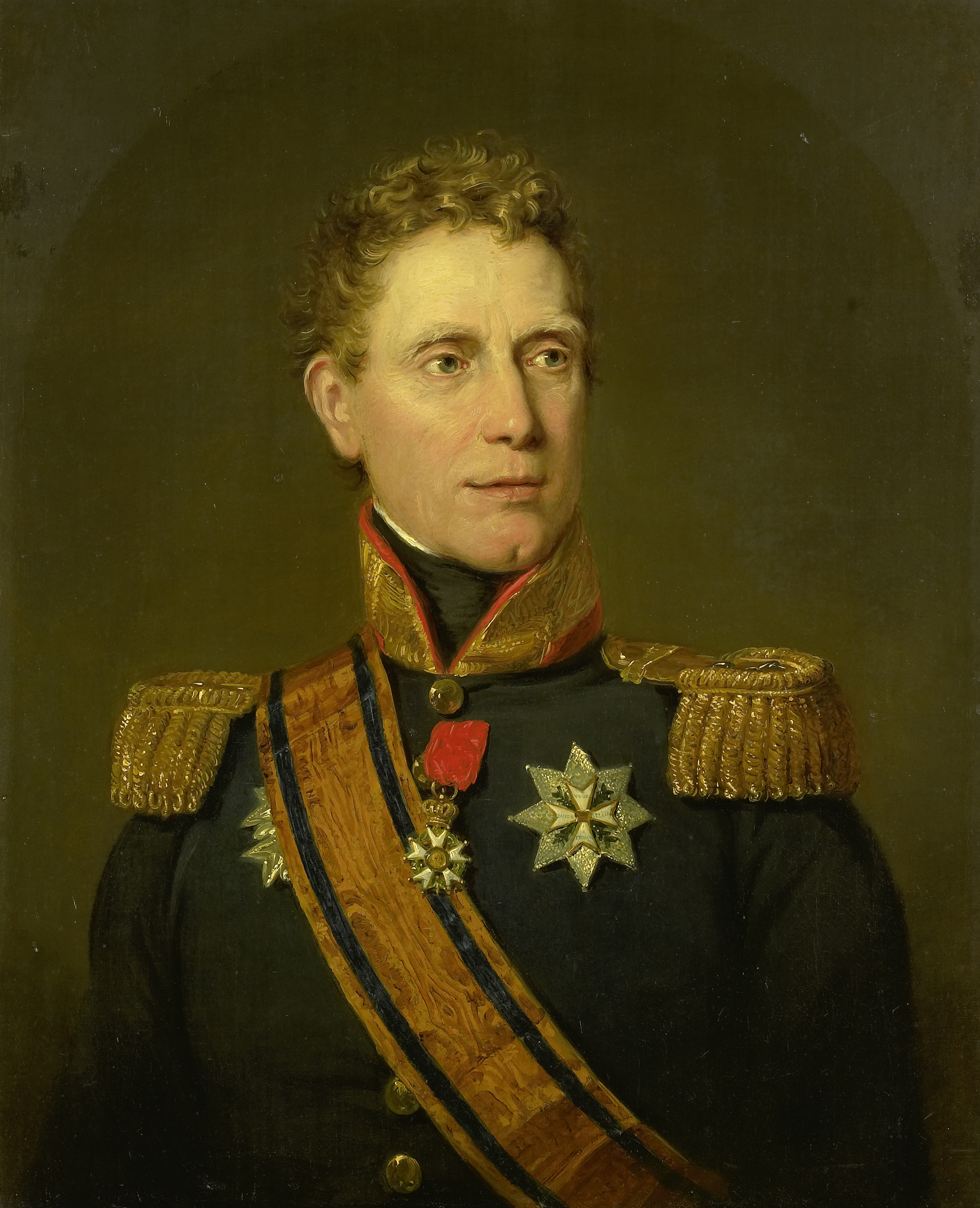
- Portrait by Jan Pieneman, c. 1815–1838

Governor-General of the Dutch East Indies
- In office 15 May 1811 – 18 September 1811
- Monarch: Napoleon Bonaparte
- Preceded by: Herman Willem Daendels
- Succeeded by: Robert Rollo Gillespie (as Lieutenant-Governor under British administration)

Governor of the Dutch Cape Colony
- In office 1 March 1803 – 18 January 1806
- Appointed by: Batavian Republic
- Preceded by: Jacob Abraham Uitenhage de Mist
- Succeeded by: David Baird (British administration)

Personal details
- Born: 12 October 1762 Nijmegen, Dutch Republic
- Died: 23 May 1838 (aged 75) The Hague, Netherlands
- Spouses: Anna Barbara Balneavis (m. 1786; died 1801) Sara Hartsen (m. 1822)
- Children: 5
- Parents: Johan Janssens (father); Adriana Rees (mother)

Military service
- Allegiance: French First Republic; First French Empire; Batavian Republic; Kingdom of Holland; Netherlands
- Branch/service: French Imperial Army; Batavian Army
- Years of service: 1774–1815
- Rank: Divisional general
- Commands: Infantry Division
- Battles/wars: French Revolutionary Wars; War of the Third Coalition; Battle of Blaauwberg; War of the Fifth Coalition; British conquest of Java; War of the Sixth Coalition; Battle of Arcis-sur-Aube
- Awards: Order of the Union; Legion of Honour; Military William Order

Jonkheer Jan Willem Janssens GCMWO (12 October 1762 – 23 May 1838) was a Dutch military officer, colonial administrator and statesman who served both as the governor of the Dutch Cape Colony and governor-general of the Dutch East Indies.

== Early life ==
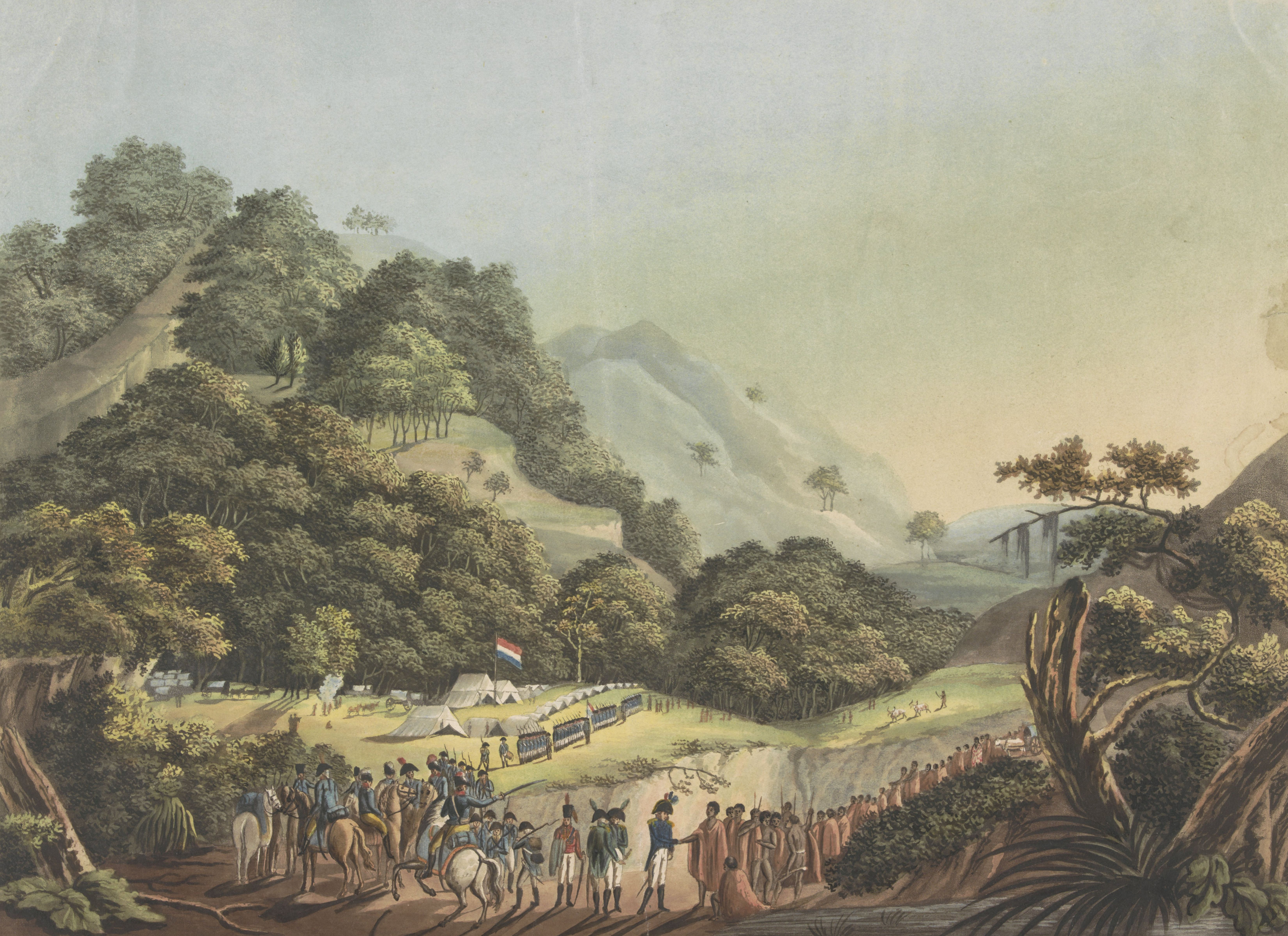
Janssens meeting the Xhosa chief Gaika in 1803

Born in Nijmegen, his military career began at the age of nine when he became a cadet in the Dutch army. He rose through the ranks and by 1793, at the start of the French Revolutionary Wars, he held the rank of colonel, and was wounded in the campaign.

== Batavian Republic ==
The Dutch surrender in 1795 made way for the mostly peaceful establishment of the Batavian Republic, a satellite state of the French First Republic. From 1795 to 1802, Colonel Janssens served mostly as an administrator within the new Batavian Army. He was appointed governor of the Cape Colony upon its return to the Dutch by the British under the terms of the Treaty of Amiens in 1802. Arriving in early 1803, he attempted to strengthen the defences of the colony, but found resources lacking, having few trained troops at his disposal and the political situation tenuous at best. During this time, he was promoted to Lieutenant-General.

The start of the War of the Third Coalition marked another British invasion of the Cape Colony. Janssens was under no impression that he had the ability to defeat the British force, led by Lieutenant-General Sir David Baird, yet he mobilized his forces and engaged the British on 8 January 1806, at the Battle of Blaauwberg, near Cape Town. His force was routed and the Cape Colony was surrendered to the British for the last time on 18 January. Under the terms of the surrender, Janssens was transported back to the Netherlands, arriving at the Hague on 8 June 1806.

By the time Janssens surrendered to the British, the war in Europe had ended with the Peace of Pressburg. When he returned to the Netherlands, Napoleon had already installed his brother Louis Bonaparte as the king of the newly formed Kingdom of Holland.

== Kingdom of Holland and the French Empire ==
Louis Bonaparte named Janssens Secretary-General of the Department of War upon his return. He held a series of high-ranking administrative posts within the kingdom until the abdication of Louis Napoleon and the annexation of the Netherlands by France in 1810. On 11 November 1810, he was appointed governor-general of the territory known, before the annexation, as the Dutch East Indies, replacing Herman Willem Daendels. He arrived in Batavia, Java on 15 May 1811 and immediately involved himself in efforts to strengthen the colony's defenses. Java benefited from a larger amount of both Dutch and French troops, as well as better defenses, compared to the Cape Colony. However, the British invasion fleet arrived shortly thereafter, on 30 July, led by Sir Samuel Auchmuty.

Janssens mounted a defense that centered around the existing fortifications, namely Meester Cornelis. However, the French soldiers under his command lacked well-trained officers and as the British laid siege to the fortress, Janssens personally led a futile defense and was forced to retreat to Buitenzorg (later the place of residence of the British governor-general, Sir Stamford Raffles. A large number of French soldiers were captured during the retreat and ensuing pursuit and Janssens was forced to surrender on 18 September 1811. He was imprisoned in Britain until 12 November 1812, when he was repatriated to the Netherlands.

In mid-March 1814, Janssens collected 3,600 French soldiers from various garrisons and successfully marched through Allied-held territory to join Napoleon at Reims. At the Battle of Arcis-sur-Aube, his division was assigned to the corps commanded by Marshal Michel Ney. On 21 March 1814, his division was embroiled in a terrific struggle for the village of Grand-Torcy during which he was wounded.

He resigned his post in the French Army on 9 April 1814.

== Post-Napoleonic War career ==
Janssens was involved with the nascent Kingdom of the Netherlands as the provisional commissary-general of war, but he resigned his post after his request to be posted once again as the governor-general of the Dutch East Indies was denied. He resigned from active duty on 22 May 1815.

He died as a highly decorated veteran in The Hague on 23 May 1838, aged 75.

== Decorations and medals ==
- Commander of the Order of the Union, 25 November 1807
- Grand Cross of the Order of the Union, 3 February 1808
- Grand Officer of the Legion of Honour, 16 May 1811
- Grand Cross of the Order of the Reunion, 22 February 1812
- Grand Cross of the Military William Order (KB No.16, 8 July 1815)
- Grand Cross of the Order of the Netherlands Lion

== Notes ==
Political offices
Preceded by Herman Willem Daendels	Governor-General of the Dutch East Indies; 1811	Succeeded by Robert Rollo Gillespie as British Lieutenant-Governor (acting, British rule)
Preceded by Jacob Abraham Uitenhage de Mist	Governor of the Dutch Cape Colony; 1803–1806	Succeeded by David Baird as Governor of the Cape Colony (acting, British rule)
