= Jacob Abraham de Mist =

Dutch statesman

Jacob de Mist
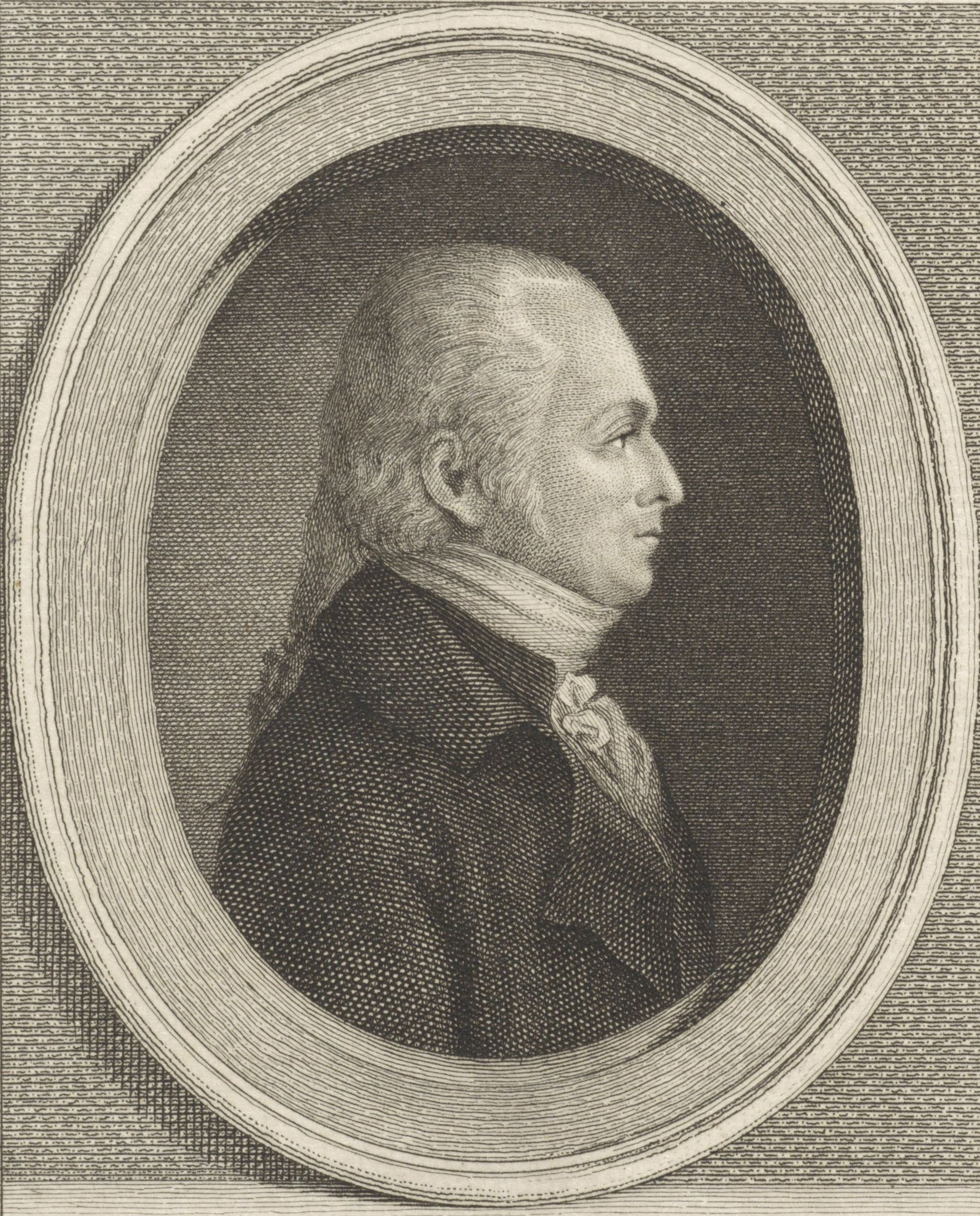

President of the National Assembly of the Batavian Republic
- In office 17 April 1797 – 1 May 1797
- Preceded by: Couperus, J
- Succeeded by: Bicker, J.A.

Grand Master of Lodge de Goede Hoop (South African Freemasons)
- In office 1804–1813
- Preceded by: Truter, J.A.
- Succeeded by: Neethling, J.H

Personal details
- Born: Jacob Abraham Uitenhage de Mist; 11 October 1763 Zaltbommel, Netherlands
- Died: 5 June 1845 (aged 81) Voorburg, Netherlands
- Spouse(s): Amalia Elisabeth Wilhelmina Strubberg van Cleve, Magdalena de Jonge and Elisabeth Margaretha Morré
- Children: 3
- Education: Leiden University
- Known for: Being a statesman and Freemasonry

Jacob Abraham Uitenhage de Mist (20 April 1749 – 3 August 1823) was a Dutch statesman. He was the Head of State of the National Assembly of the Batavian Republic from 17 April 1797 – 1 May 1797, and Commissioner-General of the Cape Colony during the Interregnum from 21 February 1803 – 25 September 1804, in accordance with the short-lived Treaty of Amiens. The Cape Colony had been under Dutch control from 1652.

In 1795 it was occupied by the British following the Battle of Muizenberg but, under the final terms of peace in 1802 among Great Britain, France and the Netherlands (then known as the Batavian Republic), the colony was restored to the Batavian Republic.

== Education and career ==
Born in Zaltbommel on 20 April 1749, de Mist was the son of a clergyman, Arnoldus de Mist, and his wife Geertruida Verstrinck. For advanced schooling, he studied Roman Dutch law at the University of Leiden, from 17 September 1766 to 1 July 1768. He practised law in Kampen from 1768 to 1769.

After that he entered political life, holding the following positions:

- Chief Administrative Officer of Leiden from 1769 to 1795.
- Member of the Council for Regional Representation for the People of Overijssel, from 1795 to October 1795.
- Member of the Committee for the Affairs and Possessions of the Batavian Republic in America and on the Coast of Guinea, from October 1795 to May 1796.
- Member of the First National Assembly of the Batavian Republic for the district of Deventer, from 17 May 1796 to 1 September 1797.
- Chairman of the First National Assembly, from 17 April 1797 to 1 May 1797
- Member of the Second National Assembly for the district of Deventer, from 1 September 1797 to 22 January 1798
- Imprisonment in The Hague, from 22 January 1798 to July 1798, after the January 1798 coup d'état, because of his political allegiance.
- Member of the Department of Justice for Amstel, from 6 April 1799 to 1 April 1802.
- Member of the Board of Asiatic Possessions and Establishments, from August 1800 to 1802.
- Commissioner-General for the Cape of Good Hope, Cape Town from 1802 to 1804.
- Member of the Board for Asiatic Possessions and Establishments, from 23 March 1804 to 1806.
- Secretary-General of the Ministry of Commerce and the Colonies, from 1806 to 1807.
- Member of the State Board for Foreign Service, in the Department of Commerce and the Colonies, from 16 July 1806 tot 14 February 1807.
- Member of the State Board for Commerce and the Colonies, from 14 February 1807 to 4 December 1807.
- Landdrost of Maasland, from 8 May 1807 to 2 December 1807.
- Member of the State Board for Foreign Service, president of the department for commerce and the colonies, from 4 December 1807 to 1 January 1809.
- First president of the Court of Accounts for the Kingdom of Holland, from 27 May 1809 to 1 December 1812,
- President of the Interim Committee, Court of Accounts, from 1 January 1812 to 30 November 1813.
- President of the provisional Court of Audit for the United Netherlands, from 30 November 1813 to 1 August 1814.
- Member of the Council of Notables for the département of Monden van de Maas, 29 and 30 March 1814.
- Member of the Board of Commerce and the Colonies, from 1814 to 1820.
- Member of the First Chamber of the States-General, from 27 September 1820 to 3 August 1823.

== Appointment by the Batavian Staatsbewind ==
The Staatsbewind of the Batavian Republic, after the return of the Dutch Cape Colony under the terms of the Treaty of Amiens, resolved that the executive and legislative authority of the Cape Colony should be committed to a governor and a council of four members, of whom one at least should be a colonist, by birth or long residence. The governor was also to be commander of the troops. The high court of justice was to be independent of the other branches of the government, and was to consist of a president and six members, all of them versed in the law. Trade with the possessions of the Batavian Republic everywhere was to be subject only to a very small duty. With these principles as a basis, the task of drawing up a plan of administration was entrusted to De Mist, an advocate of high standing and a member of the council for the Asiatic possessions and establishments.

The document prepared by De Mist gave such satisfaction that he was sent out to receive the colony from the English, install the Dutch officials, and make such regulations as he might find necessary. Lieutenant-General Jan Willem Janssens was appointed governor and was also commander-in-chief of the garrison. Three thousand one hundred and fifty soldiers were provided for it. Councillors and judges were selected for the colony.

== Commission at the Cape of Good Hope ==
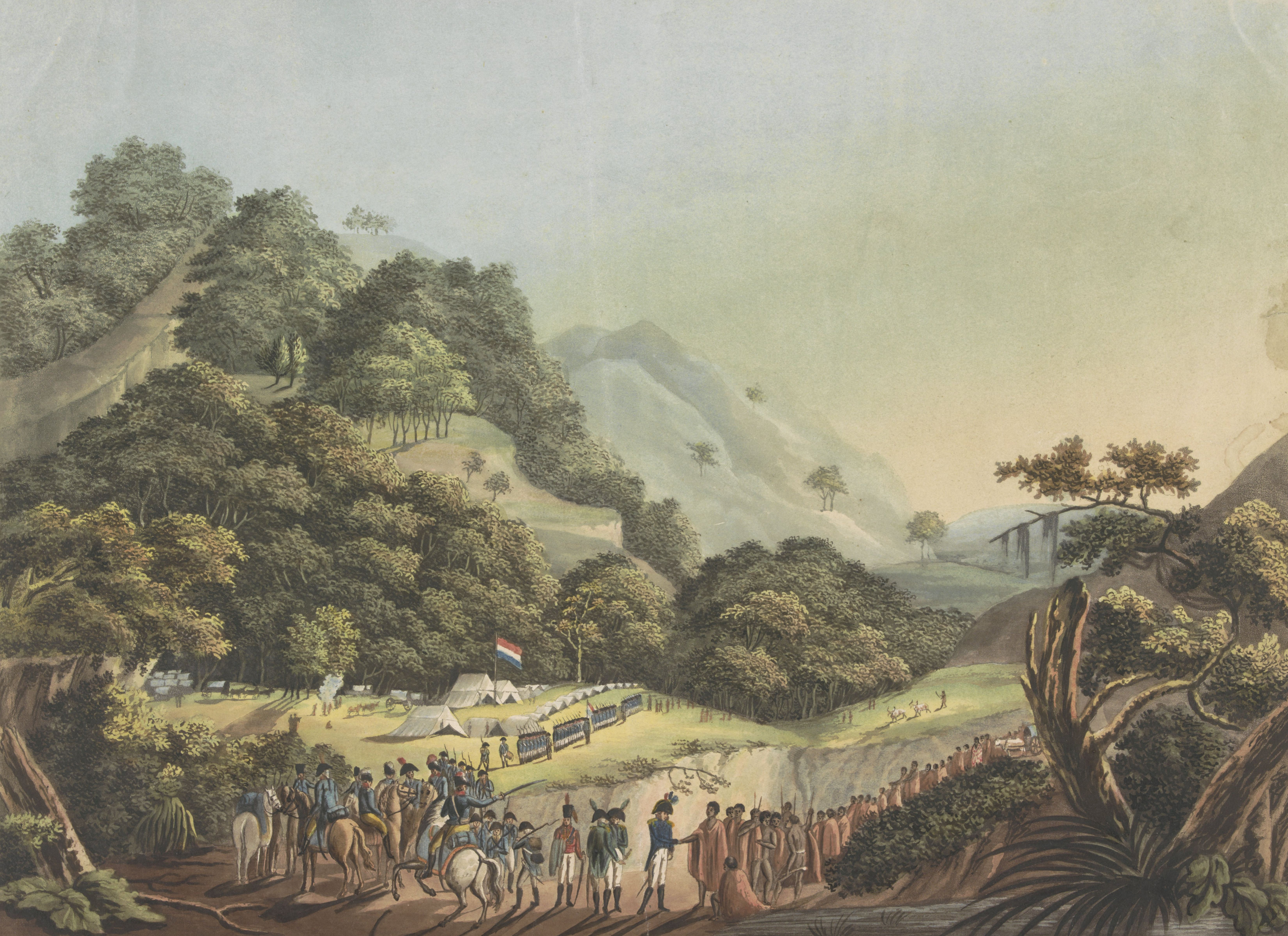
Janssens meeting the Xhosa chief Gaika in 1803

De Mist reached Cape Town on 23 December 1802, and next morning went to reside in the Castle of Good Hope. On 30 December, General Francis Dundas issued a proclamation absolving the inhabitants of the colony from the oath of allegiance to George III on and after 1 January 1803. After a temporary withdrawal of the order to hand over control, at sunset on the evening of Sunday 20 February 1803 the British garrison was relieved by Batavian forces. The next morning the Batavian flag was hoisted on the castle. De Mist announced that after making himself acquainted with the condition of the county, he would prepare a charter, which required ratification by the States-General.

In February 1804, De Mist issued a proclamation that combined several wards of the colony into a new district; General Janssens named it as Uitenhage after a title in De Mist's family. De Mist also reorganised other areas, creating Tulbagh in the same year. These actions were intended to ease administration by dividing the colony into less disparate geographic areas. The settlement was previously divided for magisterial and fiscal purposes into four districts – the Cape, Stellenbosch, Swellendam, and Graaff-Reinet. De Mist's reorganisation divided it into six of smaller size, and he stationed landdrosts in the two new districts.

== Freedom of religion ==
In July 1804 De Mist published a proclamation declaring that all religious societies that worshipped an Almighty Being were to enjoy equal protection under the law, and that no civil privileges were to be attached to any creed. This ordinance provided for the establishment of schools under control of the government and not belonging to any religious body. He was a South African Freemason.

Another ordinance of De Mist had reference to marriage and ended the need to travel to Cape Town to obtain a marriage licence and be married by a clergyman. The ordinance permitted couples to be married by a landdrost and two heemraden.

When the colony was reoccupied by the British in 1806 at the end of the interregnum, the provisions of the proclamation were annulled and not re-established until 1820.

== Resignation ==
In September 1804, de Mist laid down his authority as commissioner-general so that the governor would have greater freedom to act. An overriding question was how best to prepare defenses for the colony, as the leaders believed that the British would in time return to an attack. de Mist professed to know nothing of military matters and believed that the governor should have sole authority in this matter. The two men worked well together.

== Family life ==
In 1816, De Mist petitioned King Willem I for permission to adopt the surname 'Uitenhage de Mist', by which some of his ancestors were known. The king approved the request and issued a Koninklijke Besluit (royal licence) to that effect on 22 January 1817.

He was married three times. His first marriage was to Amalia Strubberg on 20 September 1772 in Cleves. They were divorced on 10 December 1783. They had four sons and two daughters together.

His second marriage was to Elisabeth Morré on 8 May 1796 in Beverwijk. They were divorced on 8 January 1800.

His third marriage was to Magdalena de Jonge on 20 December 1808 in The Hague.

He died on 3 August 1823, in Voorburg.

== Honours ==
- Knight of the Order of the Union, 13 February 1807.
- Knight of the Imperial Order of the Reunion (in Dutch), 7 March 1812.

== Publications ==
"Advys van het ontwerp voor eene constitutie voor het volk van Nederland." (Notice of a plan for a constitution for the people of the Netherlands.) (1796)
