= Michiel van Breda =

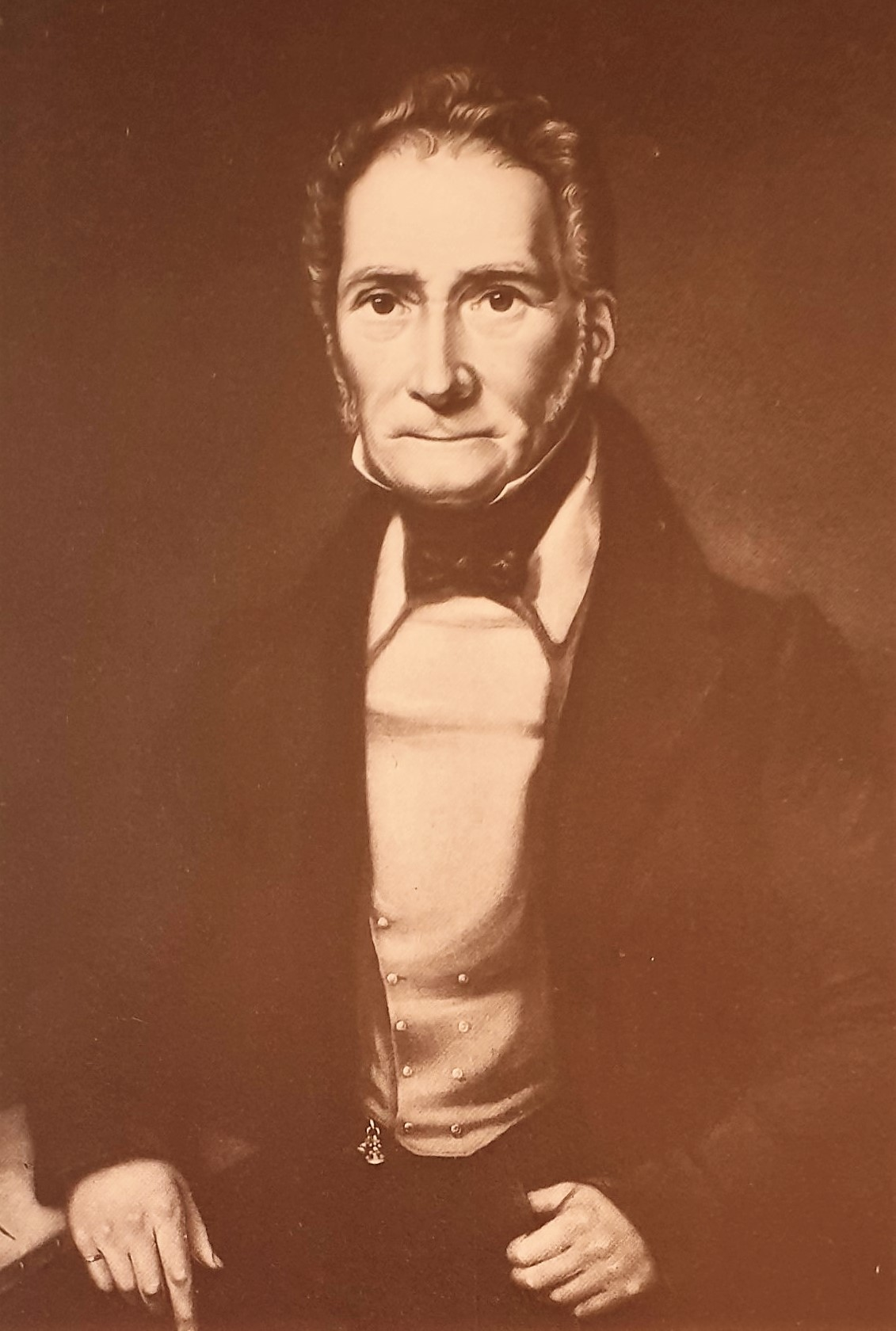

Mayor of Cape Town
- In office 1840–1844
- Preceded by: Office established
- Succeeded by: Smuts, J.J.L.

Grand Master of Lodge de Goede Hoop (South African Freemasons)
- In office 1831–1837
- Preceded by: Neethling, J.H.
- Succeeded by: Brand C.J.

Personal details
- Born: August 12, 1775 Kaapstad, Dutch Cape Colony
- Died: August 12, 1847 (aged 72) Cape Town, British Cape Colony, British Empire
- Spouse(s): Gesina van Reenen, Beatrix Elizabeth Lategan, Maria Adriana Smalberger
- Children: 9
- Known for: Founder of Bredasdorp, mayor of Cape Town

Michiel van Breda (12 August 1775– 12 August 1847) was a Cape Colony farmer, founder of Bredasdorp, Mayor of Cape Town and a Freemason.

== Roots ==
Van Breda was born on 12 August 1775 in Cape Town. His parents were Pieter van Breda and Catharina Sophia Myburg. He married three times. Out of his marriages with Gesina van Reenen, Beatrix Elizabeth Lategan and Maria Adriana Smalberger he became the father of nine children. He died in Cape Town on 12 August 1847.

== Merino sheep farming ==
In 1817 van Breda was farming on Zoetendals Vallei farm in the region which is today called Overberg. He imported Rambouillet Merino sheep from France, together with Merinos from Saxony in Germany, creating the South African Merino. He was the first person to start breeding Merino sheep in South Africa. His partner was F. W. Reitz. A Merino is a sheep primarily bred for its wool, originally from Spain. The first Merinos date back to the 12th century. The sheep is particularly well adapted to low rainfall environments climates.

== Bredasdorp ==
Van Breda and P.V. van der Byl wanted to build a church for the farming community in the Overberg, part of the Cape Province. They could not agree on a location, so both build a church, 15 kilometres apart. Two towns were founded this way. Today one is called Bredasdorp and the other Napier. Van Breda's church was built on the farm Langefontein in 1838. When a town started to develop around the church it was called Bredasdorp, a name derived from Michiel van Breda's last name.

== Mayor of Cape Town ==
In 1840 Cape Town, founded as a provisioning station by Jan van Riebeeck in 1652, was declared a municipality. Van Breda was the first mayor and was in office from 1840 to 1844. He stayed on Oranjezicht farm.

== Freemason ==
He was a member of the Dutch section of the South African Freemasons. He was Grand Master of the Lodge de Goede hoop from 1831 to 1837.
