= Abraham Chiron =

Founder of Freemasonry in South Africa

Grand master of Lodge de Goede Hoop (South African Freemasons)
- In office 1772–1776
- Preceded by: Organization started in South Africa
- Succeeded by: Gie, J.C.
- In office 1776–1784
- Preceded by: Gie, J.C.
- Succeeded by: Duminy, F.R.

Personal details
- Born: 1746 Frankfurt, Holy Roman Empire
- Died: 1822 (aged 75–76) Frankfurt, Germany
- Spouse: Marie Philippine Roger
- Children: 4 daughters
- Known for: Freemasonry, bookkeeping\banking

Abraham Chiron was a German-born book-keeper and banker who played a key role in the establishment of Freemasonry in South Africa and served as the country's first Masonic Grand Master. He also played a significant role in the early European settlement of the Cape of Good Hope in South Africa.

== Family ==
Chiron was born in 1746 in Frankfurt, Germany to Charles Chiron and Susanna Schuler. He married Marie Philippine Roger from Sedan, France. Once settled in South Africa, the couple raised four daughters: Susanna Maria (1771), Marie Charlotte (1774), Jeane Marianne (1775), and Antoinette Caroline (1778).

== Career ==
Chiron joined the Dutch East India Company in 1768 on a five-year contract and arrived the next year in Cape Town, South Africa on the ship Grosvenor . As a contracted employee, Chiron was allocated to the company's Department of Secretary for Justice in 1775. In 1782, he became responsible for the accounts of supplying ships and general book keeping duties. After The Grosvenor, a ship of the Dutch East India Company, was wrecked in August 1782 on the Pondoland Coast of South Africa, Chiron helped uncover the cause by facilitating the gathering of evidence from the survivors as he was able to speak English. Chiron communicated frequently with Joachim van Plettenberg, the Governor of the Cape of Good Hope regarding Dutch East India Company employees matters. He acted as coordinator between deceased Dutch members and their families in the Netherlands regarding their bequests.

== Freemasonry ==
Chiron joined the Zur Einigkeit Freemason Lodge in Germany in 1765. In Cape Town, he met Captain Abraham van der Weijden and a division of the Grand Lodge of the Netherlands was established in 1772. The founding members were Jacobus Alexander le Febre, Johann Coenraad Gie, Christoffel Brand, Jan Adriaan van Schoor, Olof Godlieb de Wet and Petrus Johan de Wit. Chiron served as the first Grand Master until 1776, and again from 1776 until 1781 following a brief absence.

== Later life ==
After Chiron resigned from the Dutch East India Company, he and his family returned to the Netherlands in 1784. They settled again in Frankfurt, Germany where Chiron was a bank manager until his death in 1822.
