= Johannes Andreas Truter =

Sir Johannes Andreas Truter
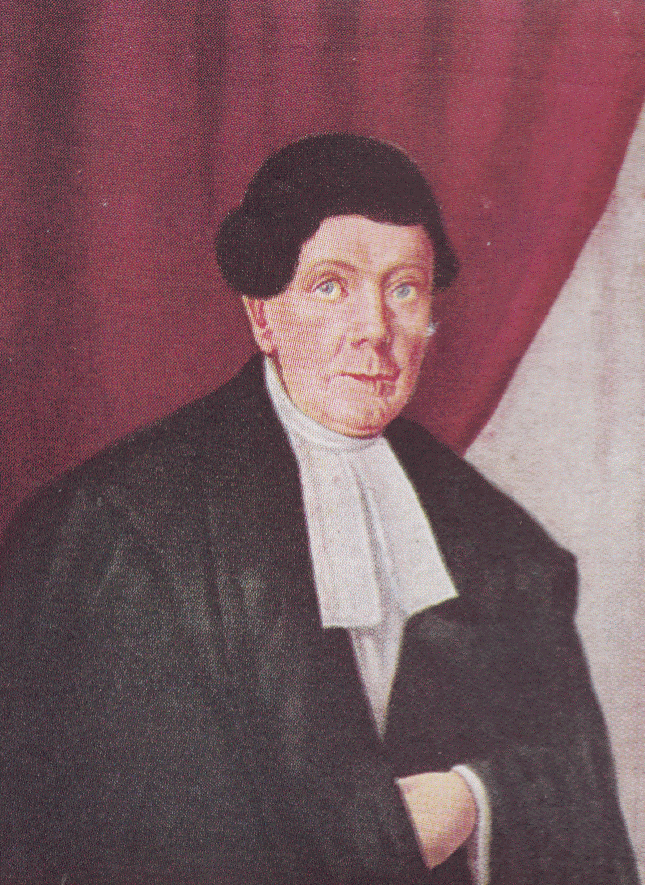

Grand Master of Lodge de Goede Hoop (South African Freemasons)
- In office 1799–1804
- Preceded by: Duminy, F.R
- Succeeded by: de Mist, J.A.U.

Chief Justice of Cape Colony
- In office 1812–1827
- Preceded by: Office established
- Succeeded by: Wylde, J.

Personal details
- Born: Johannes Andreas Truter; October 11, 1763 Cape Town, South Africa
- Died: June 5, 1845 (aged 81) Cape Town, South Africa
- Spouse: Sophia Alida Truter de Wet
- Children: 5
- Education: Leiden University
- Known for: Chief Justice and Freemason

Johannes Andreas Truter, also known as Sir John Truter (11 October 1763 - 5 June 1845), was the judicial officer of the Cape Colony and president of the Court of Justice at the Cape of Good Hope. He was also a South African Freemason and member of the Grand Orient of the Netherlands in South Africa. He was the uncle of Marie Koopmans-de Wet.

Truter also served on the first board of directors of the South African College, which would later become the University of Cape Town and SACS.
