= Olof de Wet =

South African historical figure (1739–1811)

Personal details
- Born: Olof Godlieb de Wet; 1739 Cape Town, Cape Colony, South Africa
- Died: 6 December 1811 (aged 71–72) Cape Town, Cape Colony, South Africa
- Spouse: Magdalena Saria Maria Butger
- Children: 1
- Known for: Various positions in The Dutch East India Company and Freemasonry in South Africa

Olof Godlieb de Wet (1739–1811) was a Dutch Cape Colony-born official in the Dutch East India Company and co-founder of the Freemasons in Cape Colony.

== Personal life ==
He was born in middle 1739 in Cape Town, Dutch Cape Colony. De Wet's grandfather Jacobus de Wet emigrated from Amsterdam, The Netherlands in 1693 to South Africa. His parents were Maria Magdalena Blankenberg and Johannes Carolus de Wet. He married Magdalena Saria Maria Butger in July 1761, and out of their marriage one child was born. He died at age 72 in Cape Town, South Africa on 6 December 1811.

== Work path ==
He started his working career in the Dutch East India Company (DEIC) in 1757. Through the years he stayed with the DEIC and started as assistant and followed that up with a bookkeeper (1768), office manager (1772), buyer (1775) and then a member of the Council of Justice in 1778. This was followed by work as a store manager (1782) and auctions manager(1785).

In this period he acted as Journal Writer and assistant for Governor Joachim van Plettenberg, on the governor's trips.

De Wet became the president of the Council of Commissioners for Civil and Matrimonial Affairs, in 1787. He was the president of the Council of Justice and Receiver of Revenue, in 1791 and 1793 respectively.

In the beginning of 1795, de Wet led an official commission that went to Graaff-Reinet to look into complaints by the residents against, Magistrate Honoratius Maynier . This was done on instructions received from Commissioner General Abraham Sluijsken.

== Freemasons ==
In 1772 de Wet together with the German banker Chiron, the Dutch Ships Captain van der Weijden and locals (Brand, de Wit, le Febre, van Schoor, Gie, and Pieter Soermans) started the first Freemasonry movement in South Africa.
