= David Tennant (politician) =

Cape Colony politician (1829–1905)

Sir David Tennant KCMG
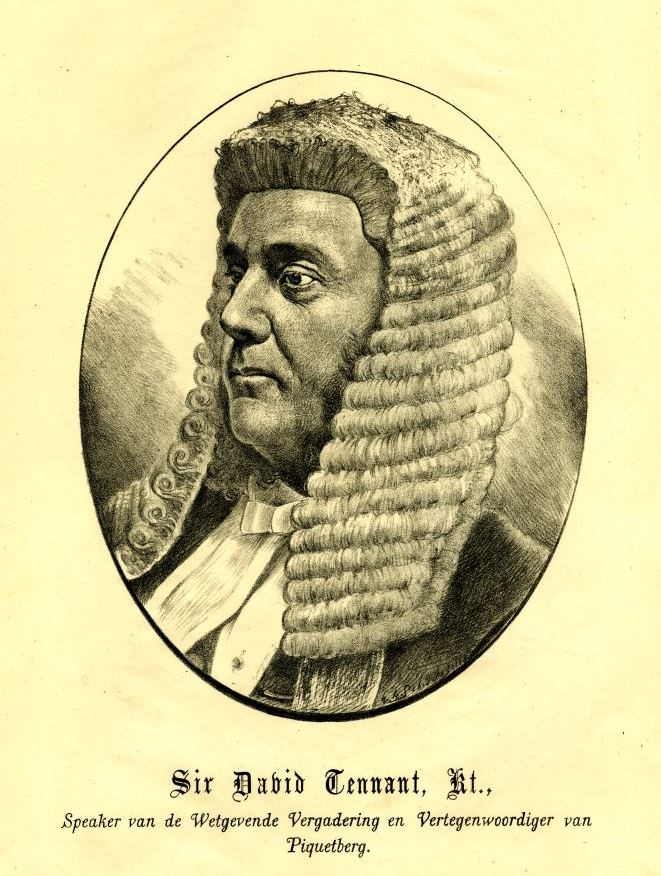

2nd Speaker of the Cape House of Assembly
- In office 1874–1895
- Monarch: Victoria
- Prime Minister: John Charles Molteno; Gordon Sprigg; Thomas Charles Scanlen; Thomas Upington; Cecil Rhodes
- Preceded by: Christoffel Brand
- Succeeded by: Henry Juta

Personal details
- Born: 10 January 1829 Cape Town, Cape Colony
- Died: 29 March 1905 (aged 76) London, England
- Occupation: Politician; Lawyer
- Profession: Attorney

Sir David Tennant KCMG (10 January 1829 – 29 March 1905) was a Cape politician, statesman and the second Speaker of the Legislative Assembly of the Cape Colony. He was in fact the longest serving parliamentary Speaker in South African history, holding the position for nearly 22 years.

== Early life and career ==
David Tennant was born in Cape Town on 10 January 1829. He was the son of Hercules Tennant and Aletta Jacoba Brand. His grandfather was Alexander Tennant, one of the first British settlers at the Cape. Unusually diligent and hard-working, he read law and became an attorney of the Supreme Court at the age of 20.

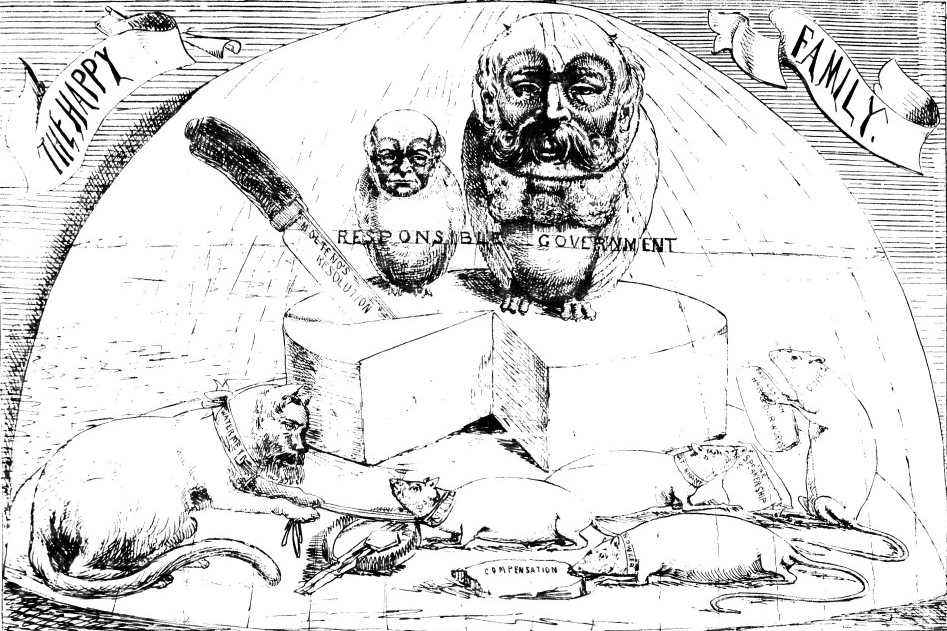
Critical cartoon, with Tennant shown as one of the mice being offered the Speakership cheese by "Molteno's resolution".

In 1866 he was elected to the Cape Parliament to represent the electoral division of Piketberg and soon distinguished himself for his efficient and honest management of parliamentary procedure. When his uncle, the Speaker of Parliament Christoffel Brand retired in 1874, Prime Minister John Molteno proposed Tennant as an ideal candidate, and he was then promptly (and unanimously) elected as the new Speaker of the Cape Assembly.

== Service as Speaker of Parliament (1874–1895) ==
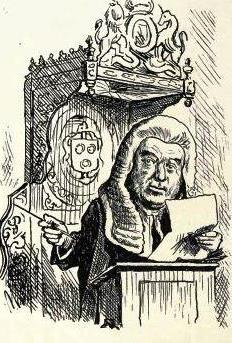
Caricature of David Tennant as Speaker. Cape Lantern publication.

The Cape Colony had only recently been brought under responsible government, and parliamentary procedure was seen as being in need of reform and streamlining to accommodate an expanding territory, a rapidly growing economy, and an increased political independence from Britain.

Tennant worked with the Molteno ministry to re-draw the rules of parliamentary operations to speed up the proceedings and remove potential for inefficiency and abuse. The success of which contributed to his re-election as speaker five times, making him the longest serving parliamentary Speaker in South African history.

However, Tennant also presided over parliament during an exceptionally stormy period, from Carnarvon's failed Confederation scheme and its resultant wars, to the eve of the Second Boer War. Nonetheless, his characteristically gentle but firm impartiality meant that when he retired in 1901 (after having been Speaker for a total of nearly 22 years), he was greatly and widely praised by all of the various opposing factions in the Assembly.

Parliamentary author Ralph Kilpin, in his book "The Old Cape House", describes Tennant as having been a hard-working and imperturbable man, with a gentle and unaffected dignity.

== Personal life ==
Tennant married Josina Hendrina du Toit in 1849 and had five children by her. After her death in 1877, he was married for a second time, to Amye Venour Bellairs. He died soon after his retirement, in London on 29 March 1905. He is buried in Brompton Cemetery.

== See also ==
- Speaker of the South African National Assembly

Political offices
Preceded by ???	Representative of Piketberg; 1866–1901	Succeeded by ???
Preceded by Christoffel Brand	Speaker of the House of Assembly of the Cape Colony; 1874–1901	Succeeded by Henry Juta
