= Christoffel Brand (trader) =

South African trader

- Born: 29 June 1738; Cape Town, Cape Colony
- Died: 27 January 1815 (aged 76); Simon’s Town, Cape Colony
- Occupations: trader, host
- Spouse: Catharina Maria Blankenberg

Christoffel Brand (1738–1815) was a trader, a well-known host at Simon’s Town near Cape Town, welcoming ships using it as a refreshment station and a participant in establishing Freemasonry in Cape Colony.

== Personal life ==
Brand was youngest child and only son of Burchard Heinrich Brand and Anna van der Bijl. He was born in Cape Town on 29 June 1738. He married Catharina Maria Blankenberg the second oldest child of Anna Margaretha van der Heyde and Johannes Hendricus Blankenberg. He died in Simon's Town on 27 January 1815.

== Work life ==
He joined the Dutch East India Company (DEIC) in 1755. His profession was that of a trader in goods. He was one of the partners in an enterprise called Cruijwagen and Company. His other partners were Gerrit Hendrik Cruijwagen, Petrus Johannes de Wit, Adam Gabriël Muller and two accountants Abraham Chiron and Hendrik Justinus de Wet. These employees of the DEIC (Dutch: Verenigde Oostindische Compagnie, the VOC) felt their salaries from the company were too low and therefore used their own enterprise to obtain income. They boarded ships before they docked in the harbour to sell their goods. Cape Town was a refreshment station in these years for ships on their way to India. He was also a prominent player in the slave trade in the Cape Colony. When the Colebrooke ship wrecked at Hangklip, he was granted permission to sell goods retrieved from the ship.

== Chief official in charge of the Trading Post in False Bay, South Africa ==
Brand was the chief official in charge of the Trading Post in False Bay, situated in Simon's Town. He was employed by the Government of the day. While on duty here, he received the British cartographer James Cook in 1771, 1772 and 1775. Cook's ship in 1771 was HMS Endeavour, and in 1772 and 1775 was HMS Resolution (1771). He befriended the British botanist Joseph Banks, who was on HMS Endeavour. Brand had an interest in plant collection. Brand's grandson C. J.Brand was the godson of Banks. British Royal Navy officer Horatio Nelson docked in 1776 with HMS Dolphin, and was accommodated by Brand. He was sent home after contracting malaria. In 1788 William Bligh with HMS Bounty stopped over before the famous mutiny. Bligh became known as an administrator in the British Colonies. All four of these men had a close friendship with Brand. In 1795 when the British took over, Brand acted as intermediary during the negotiations of the first British occupation of the Cape.

== Freemasons ==
In 1772 a German bookkeeper on a ship from Germany, travelling via the Netherlands, to South Africa called Abraham Chiron after being influenced by Abraham van der Weijden started the Freemasons in South Africa. The lodge was called Lodge de Goede Hoop. Brand was one of the founding members elected as treasury. The founding members were, apart from Chiron: Jacobus Alexander le Febre, Johann Coenraad Gie, Pieter Soermans, Jan Adriaan van Schoor, Olof Godlieb de Wet and Petrus Johannes de Wit
