= Johann Gie =

South African businessperson and freemason (b. 1727, d. 1797)

Grand Master of Lodge de Goede Hoop (South African Freemasons)
- In office 1776–1776
- Preceded by: Chiron, A.
- Succeeded by: Chiron, A.

Personal details
- Born: Johann Coenraad Gie; 22 March 1727 Zürich, Switzerland
- Died: 1 July 1797 (aged 70) Cape Town, Cape Colony
- Spouse: Engela Johanna Leij
- Children: 6
- Known for: Freemasonry, community leader, businessman

Johann Coenraad Gie was a businessman, community leader, and Grand Master of the Freemasons in Cape Colony.

== Personal life ==
Gie was born in Zürich, Switzerland, on 22 March 1727. He was one of the children of Andreas Caspar Gie and Anne Marie Liguren. He died 1 July 1797 in Cape Town.

He arrived on 23 January 1751 on the ship Rosenburg from Texel, Netherlands, as a young man working in the military. He was married on 18 December 1757 to Engela Johanna Leij. They had six children.

His working life started in the military. In 1761 he became a general merchant and later a supplier of goods. He supplied ships with goods at the refreshment station in Cape Town harbour on their way to India or Europe. He had a special licence for that.

While busy with his merchant supply activities he became the Orphan-Master of the Cape Colony in 1768. The function of the Orphan-Chamber was to look after the interest of orphans. Later in the same year he was appointed the Civil Commissioner in Matrimonial Affairs at the Matrimonial Court. The function of the Court was to establish whether couples who wanted to marry were eligible. The Court consisted of a president and six members. This court was abolished by Sir David Baird in 1806, long after Gie's death.

In 1779 he added the task of Commissioner of Fleet Affairs. These fleet affairs dealt with the management of the fleet of ships, especially regarding logistics and docking. The Dutch East India Company had a political council that governed the Cape Colony. This political council supervised the regulations of the Lords Seventeen (Dutch: Heren XVII). The Political Council appointed three citizens to attend meetings where normal citizens were involved. Those three people were called the Citizen Council. In 1784 Gie was appointed to the Council. In 1786, his request that the number of the Citizen Council be expanded to six was granted. He was appointed to the rank of captain in the civil society. In 1793, the Cape Colony was divided into wards. Gie became master of one of the wards.

== Freemasonry ==
Together with A. Chiron (first Grand Master), J. A. le Febre, P. Soermans, Christoffel Brand, J. A. van Schoor, Olof de Wet, and P. J. de Wit, Gie started the first Freemason Lodge in South Africa. It was called Lodge de Goede Hoop. In 1776, he was appointed Grand Master but, due to his inability to speak English, he had to step down. Being Swiss, however, he was fluent in German and French.
