= Kosie Marais =

Personal details
- Born: Jacobus Petrus Marais; 22 June 1900 Robertson, Cape Colony
- Died: 8 April 1963 (aged 62)
- Spouse: Joyce le Roux
- Education: Stellenbosch University
- Known for: Brandy making

Jacobus Petrus "Kosie" Marais (22 June 1900 – 8 April 1963) was a South African farmer and brandy maker. He founded the Klipdrift Brandy brand, which took its name from his family farm.

== Background ==
Marais was the son of Jacobus Petrus "Kowie" Marais and Catharina Elizabeth "Kitty" Eksteen. He grew up on the farm Wonderfontein close to Robertson, Cape Colony. As a child and his brother Eksteen (Johannes Eksteen) had a workshop and laboratory on the farm, where the generated electricity and experimented with gunpowder.

In 1921 Kosie had to stop his studies at Stellenbosch University and had to farm as his father was ill. His father died in 1922. Eksteen and Kosie became owners of the farms Klipdrift and Wonderfontein. His sister Judith Maria Magdalena, helped on the farm too. His oldest brother, Ernst Jacobus, died young in 1918. Kosie operated on Klipdrift and Eksteen on Wonderfontein. In 1957 the two brothers split: Kosie got Klipdrift, and Eksteen Wonderfontein. Kosie was a South African Freemason.

== Brandy making ==
Marais founded the Southern Liqueur Company. S.E. Warren, a director of winemaking cooperative KWV, encouraged him in 1935 to produce and market brandy. The company's product was branded Klipdrift, after the family farm where it was produced.

The first bottle was produced on 4 May 1938. The company sold a five-year-old brandy and a ten-year-old. Marais marketed it by sending a price list to military officers' messes, saying it was for "an officer and a gentleman".

After Marais' death in 1963, the company was bought by the Castle Wine and Brandy Company. That later became part of Distell, and then Heineken.

His brands have won awards and are highly regarded internationally. It is still made to Marais's recipe.

== Other activities ==
=== Archeology ===
Fritz Heese introduced Marais to archeology. According to Major C.R Wolhuter, he and Marais were the only two residents of Robertson, South Africa that were members of the Society to Promote Science. Marais worked through the society as an archaeologist. He made contact with Henri Breuil. His theory was that tools made of stone that he found in the soil were older than the San people. He and Abbé Breuil took a trip to South West Africa and Bechuanaland. Breuil agreed with his theory. Marais was made a member of the Archaeological Society.

=== Target shooting ===
He won the Governors-general trophy in the national "Bisley shooting" (target shooting) competition in 1934. He was chosen to represent South Africa.

=== Politics ===
Marais and his family were members of the South African Party.

The United Party ask him to stand for election in George, Western Cape, South Africa in 1948 against P.W. Botha (the later president of South Africa) of the National Party. The National Party won (retained) the ward.

He joined the Torch Commando, a group of former soldiers founded in 1951 to oppose apartheid.

== Personal life ==
He married Joyce le Roux from Franschhoek in 1926. The couple had four children.

== Burial ==
He was buried on a hill from where he used to look out over his lands. Kosie was commemorated in the name Major's Hill Winery now known as Majors Drift Estate. He held the rank of Major in the Union Defence Force. The War Medal and the Africa Service Medal were awarded to Marais.
