= Christoffel Brand =

Cape lawyer (1797–1875)

Sir Christoffel Brand
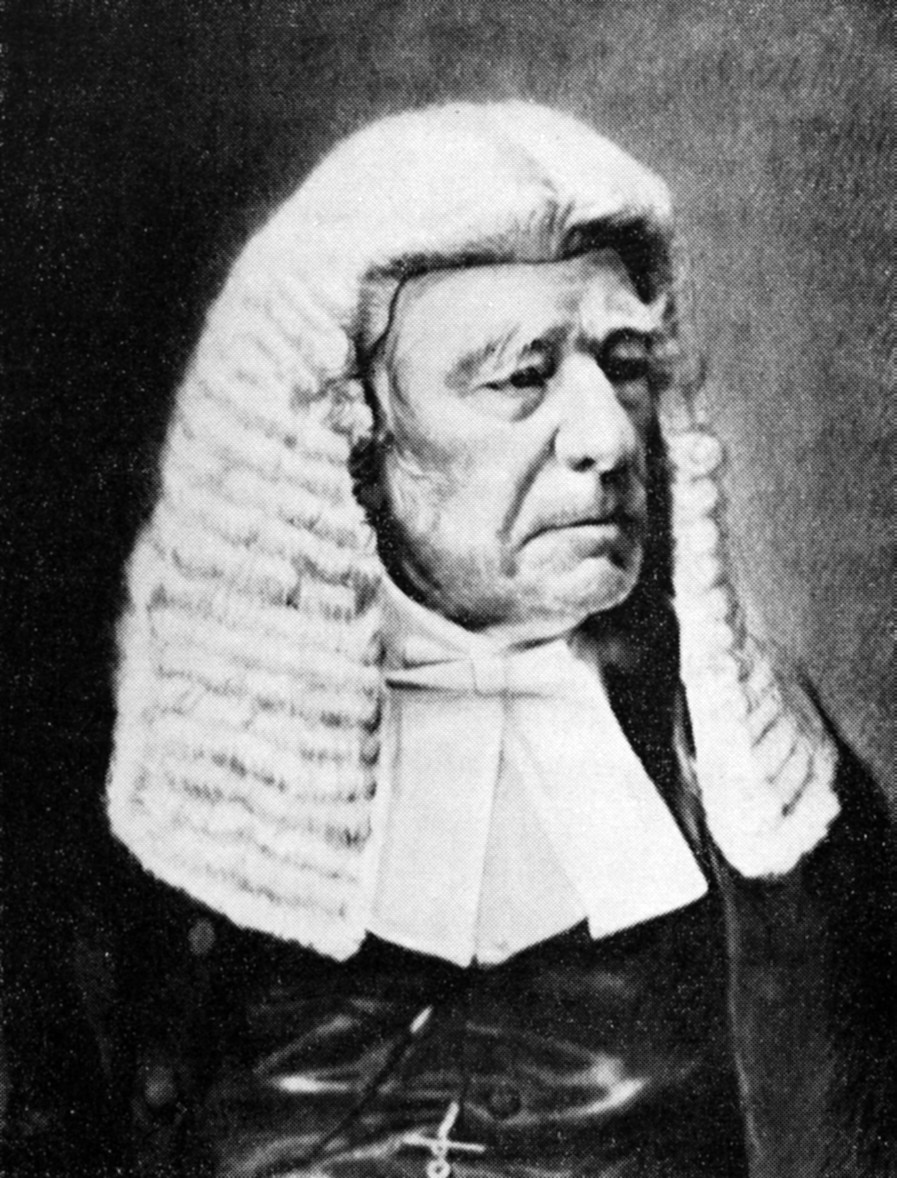

1st Speaker of the Cape House of Assembly
- In office 1854–1873
- Monarch: Victoria
- Prime Minister: John Charles Molteno (1872–1873)
- Governor: George Grey; Robert Wynyard; Philip Wodehouse; Charles Craufurd Hay; Henry Barkly
- Preceded by: Position established
- Succeeded by: David Tennant

Grand Master of Lodge de Goede Hoop (South African Freemasons)
- In office 1837–1874
- Preceded by: Michiel van Breda
- Succeeded by: J. H. Hofmeyr

Personal details
- Born: 21 June 1797 Cape Town, Dutch Cape Colony
- Died: 19 May 1875 (aged 77) Cape Town, Cape Colony
- Spouse: Catharina Frederica Küchler
- Children: Sir Johannes Brand
- Education: University of Leiden
- Occupation: Politician, newspaper editor
- Profession: lawyer, journalist
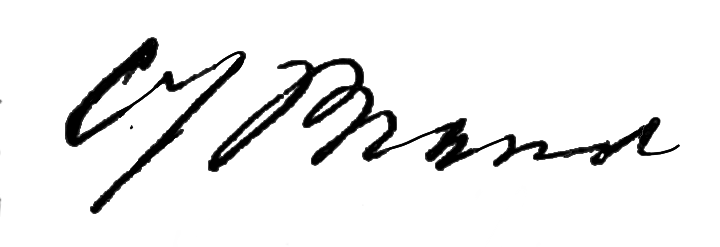
- Signature

Sir Christoffel Joseph Brand (21 June 1797 Cape Town – 19 May 1875 Cape Town) was a Cape jurist, politician, statesman and first Speaker of the Legislative Assembly of the Cape Colony.

== Early life and education ==
Christoffel Brand was born in 1797, during the twilight years of the Dutch East India Company and the Dutch Cape Colony. Brand came from a long line of Dutch colonial administrators: both his father and grandfather (Christoffel Brand) had been officials with the Dutch East India Company. He was the godson of Joseph Banks, the noted British naturalist, whom his grandfather had worked with.

After receiving his initial education in Cape Town, Brand attended the University of Leiden from 1815, where he obtained a doctorate in law in 1820 with a dissertation on the relationship that colonies have to the mother country – Dissertatio politico-juridica de jure coloniarum. He also earned a doctorate of letters with a thesis Quaestiones in Socratis sententiam de Deo.

== Career ==
He returned to The Cape and in 1821 established a law practice in Cape Town, before beginning to take an active interest in politics. He was one of the founders of the Zuid-Afrikaansch Athenaeum (South Africa's first university for Dutch-speaking students) in 1828, and was one of the first advocates in the Supreme Court in 1829. A founder member of the newspaper De Zuid-Afrikaan, he was also its editor and championed the Dutch language in his editorials. Brand was bitterly disillusioned by the manner in which he perceived the British government to have marginalized the Cape Dutch community, in particular the way they had supplanted the Dutch legal system in the Cape with an Anglophone common law system.

Together with John Fairbairn, he campaigned for representative government and supported the Anti-Convict Movement. Together with F. W. Reitz Sr. (father of State President Francis William Reitz of the Orange Free State), Fairbairn and Stockenström, he agitated for an elected Legislative Assembly. When representative government was finally introduced, Brand became the first Speaker of the Cape House of Assembly – a position he held for 20 years. He was knighted in 1860.

He was also a prominent supporter of the movement for responsible government, and became the first Speaker of the Cape parliament under this new system, when it was instituted by the Molteno Ministry in 1872.

Sir Christoffel was a South African Freemason and Deputy Grand Master National of the Grand Orient of the Netherlands (Het Groot Oosten der Nederlanden) in The Cape from 1847 to 1874.

== Family ==
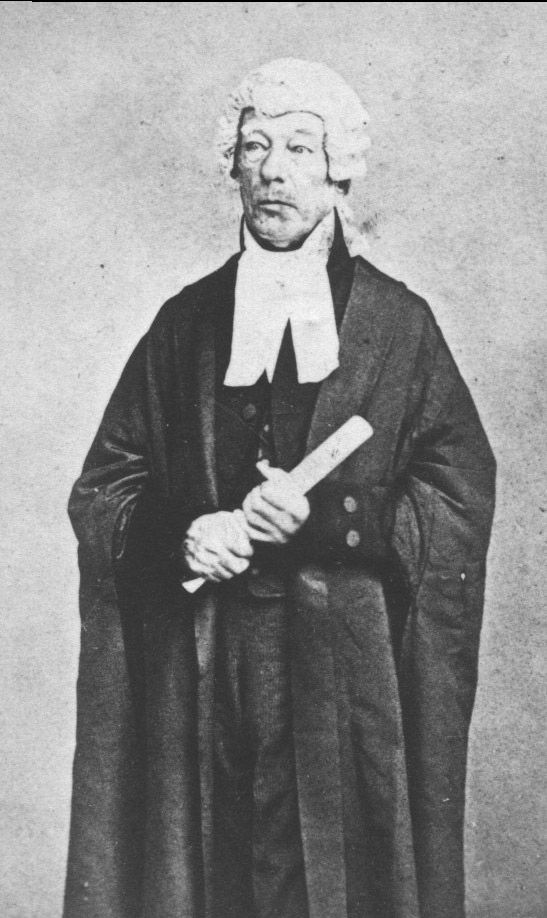
Sir Christoffel Brand, 1860s–1870s

Christoffel Brand was married to Catharina Fredrica Küchler. His son was Sir Johannes Brand who became 4th State President of the Orange Free State. His second name "Joseph" was after the naturalist Sir Joseph Banks, a close friend of Christoffel's grandfather. His great-nephew was the architect Norman Eaton.

== See also ==
- Speaker of the South African National Assembly

Political offices
Preceded by Office created	Speaker of the House of Assembly of the Cape Colony; 1854–1873	Succeeded by Sir David Tennant
