= Die Afrikaanse Patriot =

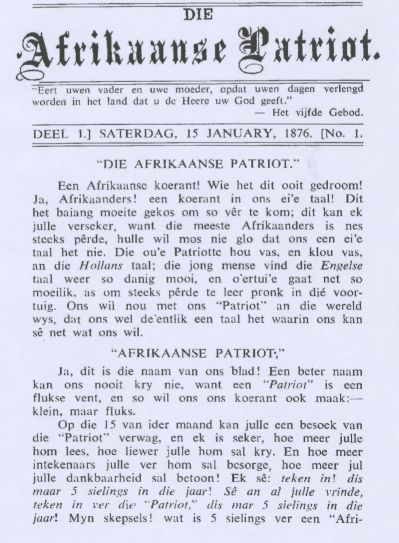
- Front page of the first issue
- Editor: C.P. Hoogenhout
- Founded: 1876
- Ceased publication: 1904
- Language: Afrikaans
- City: Paarl
- Country: Cape Colony

Die Afrikaanse Patriot was the first Afrikaans-language newspaper. The first issue was published in Paarl on 15 January 1876. Initially a monthly magazine, it became a weekly two years later.

Even though the first edition had just 50 subscribers, it swiftly drew sharp condemnation for promoting Afrikaans as a literary language, as it was then considered nothing more than a "kitchen" variety of Dutch. By the third year, subscription rose to 3,000 thanks to the support from readers in the Transvaal Republic.

The newspaper would however lose much of its readership in 1892, when it endorsed Cecil Rhodes in its conflict against the president of Transvaal, Paul Kruger. Die Patriot ultimately went out of business in 1904.
