= Pandour Corps =

Light infantry unit of the Dutch Cape Colony

- Korps Pandoeren
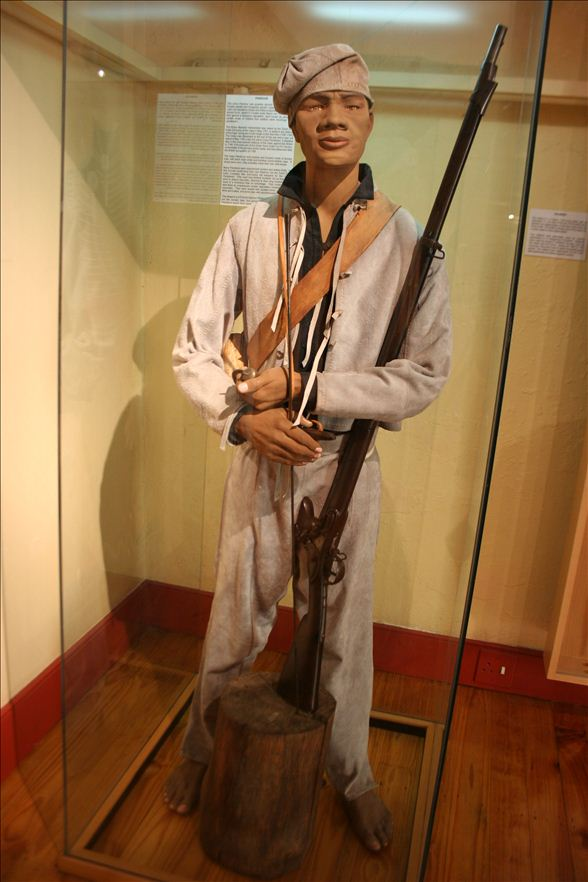
- The uniform of a private of the Pandour Corps
- Active: 1793–1795
- Country: Dutch Cape Colony
- Allegiance: Dutch East India Company
- Type: Light infantry
- Role: Internal security
- Size: 200
- Engagements: War of the First Coalition; Invasion of the Cape Colony

The Pandour Corps (Dutch: Korps Pandoeren) was a light infantry unit raised in the Dutch Cape Colony in 1793 during the French Revolutionary Wars. After the French First Republic's declaration of war on the Dutch Republic on 1 February 1793, which brough Holland into the War of the First Coalition, the twin governors of the Cape Colony, Sebastiaan Cornelis Nederburgh and Simon Hendrik Frijkenius, raised the unit as an emergency measure to defend the colony against invasions from the sea. The Pandour Corps consisted of Coloured soldiers led by white officers, and was the second such unit raised in the colony after Dutch officials noted the skirmishing ability of Coloured troops compared to their European counterparts.

Coloured soldiers of the unit were mostly servants on burgher-owned farms, and many were recruited from Christian missions in the colony. In 1795, Great Britain launched an invasion of the Cape Colony in order to secure British trade with the East Indies. After British forces landed at the colony on 11 June, the Pandour Corps fought in several skirmishes, including successful attacks at Sandvlei on 8 August and Muizenberg on 1 September. However, dissatisfaction with their poor treatment led to a brief mutiny, which was resolved when Governor Abraham Josias Sluysken granted the mutineers several concessions. The Pandour Corps only saw limited action afterward before being disbanded after Britain's takeover of the colony.

Although the Pandour Corps' existence was short-lived, the new British colonial authorities reconstituted the unit as the 300-strong Hottentot Corps in 1796, seeing the need to secure the loyalty of the Coloured community to Britain. The unit was renamed as the Cape Regiment in 1801, seeing action in the Third Xhosa War. Under the terms of 1802 Treaty of Amiens, the British ceded the Cape Colony to the Batavian Republic, which also raised Coloured units, including the Hottentot Light Infantry, which fought in the second British invasion of the Cape Colony. After assuming control of the colony for the second time, Britain continued to raised Coloured units, which would go on to serve in the fourth, fifth and sixth Xhosa wars.

== Background ==
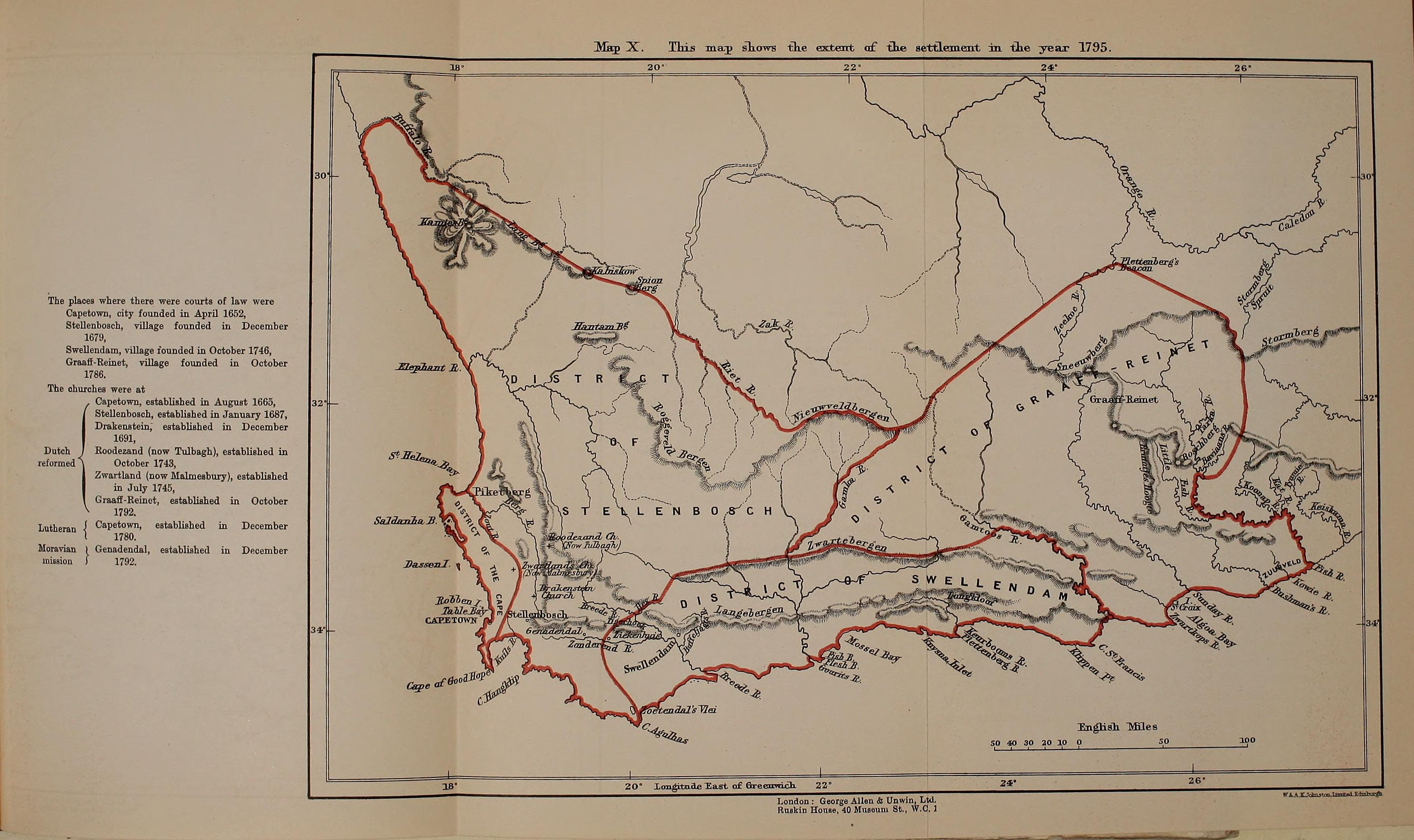
The borders of the Dutch Cape Colony in 1795

In 1652, the Dutch East India Company (VOC) established the Cape Colony in Southern Africa. Colonisers from Europe began emigrating to the colony, where they soon became involved in conflict with the indigenous Khoekhoe people. Along with the importation of thousands of slaves to the Cape Colony, this led to the need for a significant military presence in the colony for internal security duties. Despite this, the VOC's armed forces, consisting largely of foreign mercenaries, was unable to meet this need, and the burgher (free settler) population of the Cape Colony was too small. As a result, Dutch officials turned to recruiting free people of colour for military service, most prominently for the colony's militia after it was established in 1722.

Otto Frederick Mentzel, a German soldier stationed at the Cape Colony during the 1730s, advocated in his memoirs for the recruitment of local mixed-race people of Khoekhoe and European descent (known as Hottentots or Coloureds) by the VOC, describing them as "good marksmen and faithful". Coloured people were already familiar with European forms of warfare, and suggestions to recruit them for military service was met with increasing approval among Dutch officials. During the 1770s, as Dutch expansion on the colony's frontier stalled due to resistance from the Khoekhoe and San peoples, VOC officials took a closer interest in the Coloured community. This resulted in the creation of the Free Corps, a militia unit of Coloured troops raised in Stellenbosch.

In December 1780, the Kingdom of Great Britain declared war on the Dutch Republic in response to a variety of diplomatic issues between the two nations, sparking the Fourth Anglo-Dutch War. After news of the outbreak of war reached the Cape Colony, VOC officials in the colony raised the Bastard Hottentot Corps in 1781. Based in Cape Town, the unit consisted of 400 men and was under the command of the officers Hendrik Eksteen and Gerrit Munnik. Unlike the Free Corps, the Bastard Hottentots Corps was not a racially segregated unit, consisting of both Coloured and white soldiers. It was the first time that Coloured people had been subject to conscription and proved immensely unpopular among them, leading many Coloured men to flee into the interior. After seeing no action during 14 months of service, it was disbanded in c. 1782 when the Regiment de Meuron arrived at the colony.

== Service ==
After the French First Republic declared war on the Dutch Republic on 1 February 1793, the twin governors of the Cape Colony, Sebastiaan Cornelis Nederburgh and Simon Hendrik Frijkenius, raised a light infantry unit of 200 men named the Pandour Corps (Dutch: Korps Pandoeren). The unit, raised an emergency measure to defend the colony from a possible French attack, consisted largely of Coloured servants released from European-owned farms and supplied with equipment by their burgher masters; the Moravian mission at Baviaanskloof provided significant numbers of recruits for the unit. A segregated unit, the Pandour Corps' enlisted personnel and non-commissioned officers consisted of Coloured recruits who were familiar with the use of muskets. Officers of the unit were drawn from experienced white personnel of the colony's garrison and militia units, and Captain Jan Cloete, a wealthy burgher who owned land near Stellenbosch, was appointed as the unit's commandant.

French forces overran the Dutch Republic in 1795, which became the Batavian Republic. William V, Prince of Orange quickly fled to England, where he issued the Kew Letters urging Dutch colonial authorities to accept occupation by Britain. A British expeditionary force was soon sent to invade the Cape Colony and eliminate the threat it posed to Britain's trade with the East Indies. When the expeditionary force arrived at Simon's Bay on 11 June, the Pandour Corps was stationed alongside other Dutch soldiers at defensive fortifications at Muizenberg and under the command of Lieutenant-colonel Carel Matthys Willem de Lille. The Dutch stood by as the British took control of a strategic bridgehead at a VOC outpost in Simon's Bay; the Pandour Corps was subsequently involved in several skirmishes with British forces, but a combined British ground and naval offensive against the Dutch defenders of Muizenberg on 7 August resulted in the unit being withdrawn to Steenberg.

On the very next day, the Pandour Corps attacked the British vanguard at Sandvlei, forcing them to retreat while leaving their provisions and baggage behind. Between five and six soldiers of the unit were killed, though "it was clear that members of this corps excelled in unconventional or guerilla warfare." On the morning of 1 September, the Pandour Corps attacked two British outposts near Muizenberg, killing five British soldiers and wounding 14 while suffering no casualties. However, in the afternoon the unit mutinied by marching with their weapons drawn to the Castle of Good Hope to personally present their complaints of being ill-treated and insufficiently paid to Governor Abraham Josias Sluysken. Sluysken managed to placate the mutineers by promising them several concessions and giving each mutineer two farthings each. On 2 September the unit marched back to Steenberg, but saw no more military action up until Sluysken surrendered to the invaders on 14 September.

== Aftermath ==
1797 illustration of a soldier of the Hottentop Corps

The Pandour Corps was disbanded after the British takeover. In May 1796, the new British administration reconstituted the unit as the Hottentot Corps, concluding that raising a Coloured unit was necessary to secure their loyalty to Britain and intimidate rebellious burghers into accepting British rule; the historian Johan de Villiers described the decision as "actuated more by political than military views." British officials perceived the new unit's creation as the best way to alter the lifestyle of Coloured people, who had been stereotyped as excessively sedentary by Dutch colonial texts. Governor George Macartney remarked in 1797 that "The Hottentot is capable of a much greater degree of civilisation than is generally imagined, and perhaps converting him into a soldier may be one of the best steps towards it."

The Hottentot Corps consisted of 300 men, and was initially stationed at Wynberg before it was moved to Hout Bay in 1798. On 25 June 1801, it was reorganised into the Cape Regiment, a line infantry unit consisting of 735 men divided into 10 companies. It fought in the Third Xhosa War, and a number of the Cape Regiment's Coloured soldiers were given plots of land as reward for their military service. The British ceded the colony back to the Batavian Republic in 1803 under the Treaty of Amiens. Batavian officials disbanded the Cape Regiment, but raised the Free Hottentot Corps on 21 February 1803. The unit was subsequently renamed as the Hottentot Light Infantry and fought at Blaauwberg in January 1806, which saw the British occupy the colony again as part of the War of the Third Coalition.

The British re-raised the Cape Regiment in October 1806, with it again consisting of 10 companies; Major John Graham was transferred from the 93rd Regiment of Foot to command the Cape Regiment, which fought in the Fourth Xhosa War. On 24 September 1817 the regiment was reformed into the Cape Cavalry, a unit of 100 dragoons, and the 100-strong Cape Light Infantry, with both units seeing service in the Fifth Xhosa War. In 1820, both units were combined and renamed as the Cape Corps, which was subsequently reorganised into the Cape Mounted Riflemen on 25 November 1827. The new unit's infantry wing was disbanded and the whole unit was transformed into a battalion-sized mounted infantry unit armed with carbines and equipped with dark green uniforms that served in the Sixth Xhosa War.
