= Census in the Dutch East Indies =

Censuses in the Dutch East Indies were censuses in the Dutch East Indies colony of the Netherlands. The last census was conducted in 1930.

== History ==
Sebastiaan Cornelis Nederburgh, the former Commissioner-General of the Dutch Cape Colony, organized the first formal census of Java in 1795. Between 1880 and 1905, the Dutch East Indies conducted partial population counts every five years, with most of the data being limited to Java. This was later followed by full censuses in 1920 and 1930. A third full census was planned for 1940 but was cancelled because of Japanese occupation of the Indies during World War II.
