= Cape Corps =

Former South African Army infantry regiment

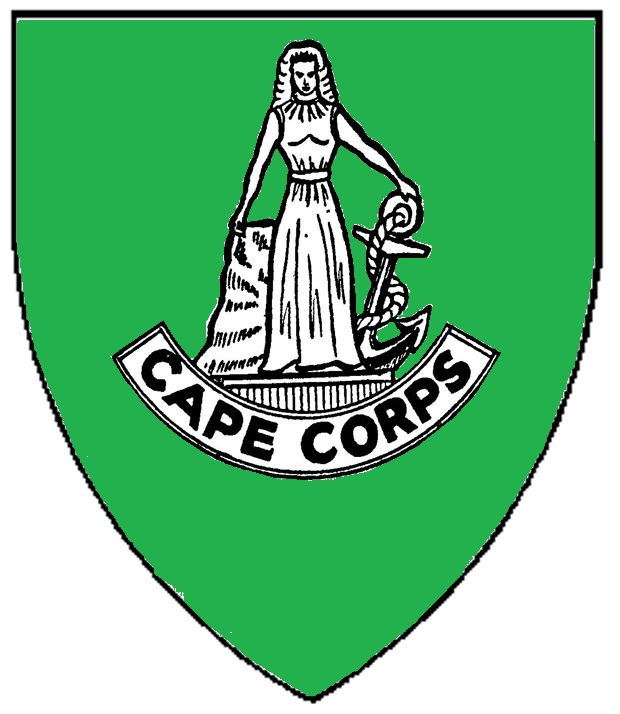
- Cape Corps emblem
- Active: 1781-1878, 1915-1991
- Country: South Africa
- Allegiance: South Africa
- Branch: South African Army
- Type: Infantry
- Role: Motorised Infantry
- Size: One Battalion
- Part of: South African Infantry Corps
- Garrison/HQ: Cape Town and Kimberly
- Motto: Fortiter et fideliter
Battle honours
1915
Awarded

Unknown code: East Africa 1916-17
Unknown code: East Africa 1917-18
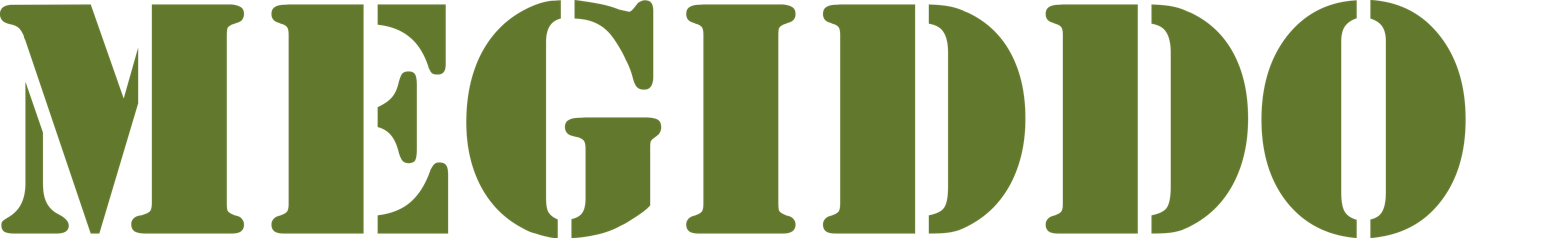

Unknown code: Palestine 1918

The Cape Corps and its predecessor units were the main military organisations in which the Coloured members of South Africa's population served.

== History ==
As one of the military units of South Africa with one of the longest histories, the Cape Corps reflects the history of South Africa's Coloured population to a great extent.

=== Pre-history ===
==== 1770s ====
In the 1770s, the Dutch authorities established the first Coloured military unit, the Free Corps. The unit consisted solely of Coloured recruits and no white people were allowed to join except as officers, marking the beginning of racially segregated units in the military history of South Africa.

==== 1781–1782 ====
The second Coloured unit to be formed was the Bastard Hottentot Corps (Dutch: "Corps Bastaard Hottentoten"), which was organised in 1781 by the Dutch colonial administration of the time. Based in Cape Town and drawing its members from men of mixed Hottentot and White ancestry, this unit had about 400 members under the command of Hendrik Eksteen and Gerrit Munnik. The unit was disbanded in 1782 when French mercenaries arrived in the Cape.

==== 1793–1806 ====
1797 illustration of a Hottentop Corps soldier

In 1793 this unit was re-formed in Cape Town as the Pandour Corps with 200 men under the command of Captain Jan Cloete, only to be disbanded again in 1795. The unit was re-formed again under the new British colonial administration in May 1796, this time under the name Hottentot Corps. It was headquartered in Wynberg and consisted of about 300 men. In 1798 the headquarters were moved to Hout Bay. On 25 June 1801 the Cape Regiment was formed. It was organised as a British imperial regiment of ten companies and retained all the personnel of the Hottentot Corps.

With the Dutch taking over colonial administration of the Cape once again, the Corps Vrye Hottentotten ("Corps of Free Hottentots") was formed on 21 February 1803. It was later renamed the Hottentot Ligte Infanterie ("Hottentot Light Infantry") and saw action against the British expeditionary force to capture the Cape colony from the French allied Batavian Republic during the Napoleonic Wars at the Battle of Blaauwberg.

=== Formation and early history ===
==== Formation: 1806-1814 ====
When the British returned to the Cape following the Battle of Blaauwberg in 1806 the Dutch Hottentot Ligte Infanterie was disbanded and reformed as The Cape Regiment in October 1806 a British line regiment. Major John Graham was transferred from the 93rd regiment of foot to lead the newly formed Cape Regiment. Headquartered in Cape Town, initially based at Rietvlei, it was organised as a typical colonial unit with British officers and Coloured other ranks. In later years, the Regiment also had a troop of light cavalry added. Following the Congress of Vienna and the end of the Napoleonic Wars in 1814 the Dutch Cape Colony was formally transferred to the British as the British Cape Colony.

==== Cape Colony: 1814-1870 ====
On 24 September 1817 the Regiment was reduced in size (a previous order to completely disband having either been ignored or rescinded) to two small units of about 200 men for the defence of the Cape Colony's eastern frontier. The two units were named the Cape Cavalry (consisting of one troop of dragoons) and the Cape Light Infantry. Mathew Richmond, coming from the Royal Military College, joined them in 1817.

In 1820 these two units were again combined under a unified command and renamed the Cape Corps. The Cape Mounted Riflemen (Imperial) were formed on 25 November 1827; the Corps was reorganised as battalion of mounted infantry.

In 1850 some soldiers effectively mutinied by joining Coloured rebellion in the eastern Cape; the regiment was subsequently reconstituted as mixed unit with both White and Coloured members. Some years later, in 1854, the recruitment of Coloured members for the battalion was completely halted.

The battalion was completely disbanded in 1870 when military service was abolished for Coloureds, although its name and traditions were appropriated in 1878 by another (all-White) Cape Mounted Riflemen.

=== Twentieth century ===
==== World War I: 1915–1918 ====
As part of South Africa's efforts for World War I, the Cape Corps was re-formed in the Cape Province by Sir Walter Stanford, as a single battalion in December 1915 as part of the Union Defence Force. In 1916 the Corps was expanded and a second battalion raised. The original battalion was redesignated the 1st Battalion and the new unit (which was disbanded in 1918) as the 2nd Battalion.

==== World War II: 1940–1950 ====
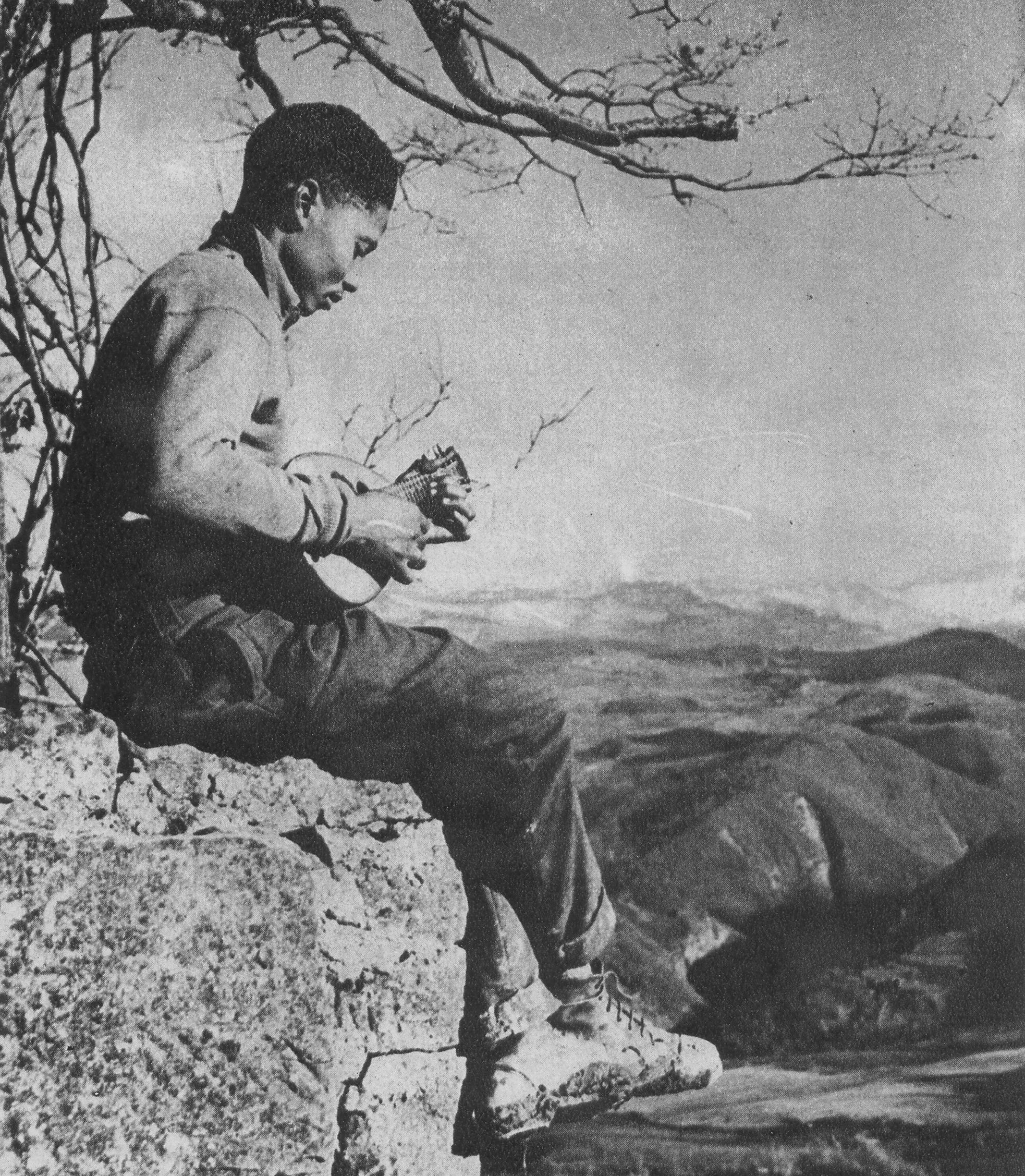
Driver of the Cape Corps assigned to the South African 6th Armoured Division outside Bologna, Italy 1944.

In order to provide additional troops for South Africa's participation in World War II, the Cape Corps was reconstituted again on 8 May 1940, partly from the Association of the 1915-1918 Corps.

This unit was assigned the role of a non-combatant service corps with a pioneer battalion and five motor transport companies. It was later expanded to include several motorised infantry battalions, infantry battalions, prisoner of war (POW) guard battalions and POW escort battalions. At its peak strength, the Corps had about 23,000 members. On 13 October 1942 the Corps absorbed the South African Indian and Malay Corps (IMC) but was itself disbanded at the end of hostilities in 1945.

In 1947 the Cape Corps was reconstituted as a Permanent Force Coloured service corps only to be disbanded in 1950 by the newly elected National Party, which abolished military service for Coloureds.

==== Apartheid era: 1963–1991 ====
The Cape Corps was reformed again in 1963, as a non-combatant Coloured service corps; it was considered to be the successor to all the previous Coloured and Cape Corps units since 1796. The Corps was designated a Permanent Force unit of the South African Defence Force in 1972.

In 1973 the unit was renamed the South African Cape Corps Service Battalion. When the South African Defence Act was amended in 1975 to give Coloureds "equivalent status to whites" in the South African Army, the battalion was renamed the South African Cape Corps Battalion, its combatant status was restored and the first Coloured officers were commissioned.

During the period 1979 to 1989 the South African Cape Corps (SACC) was substantially expanded:

- The SACC Maintenance Unit was formed in 1979 from some of the members of the original service battalion.
- The original combat battalion was renamed 1st Battalion when the 2nd Battalion was raised in December 1984.
- The 3rd Battalion was raised in Kimberley in 1989.
- The SACC School and SACC School for Junior Leaders were founded.

In 1990 the SACC was reduced to a single battalion and redesignated 9 South African Infantry Battalion which was reroled as a seaborne light infantry unit. Currently, as a result of the post-1994 transformation of South Africa, Coloured soldiers, sailors and airmen serve alongside their fellow South Africans in a fully integrated South African National Defence Force.

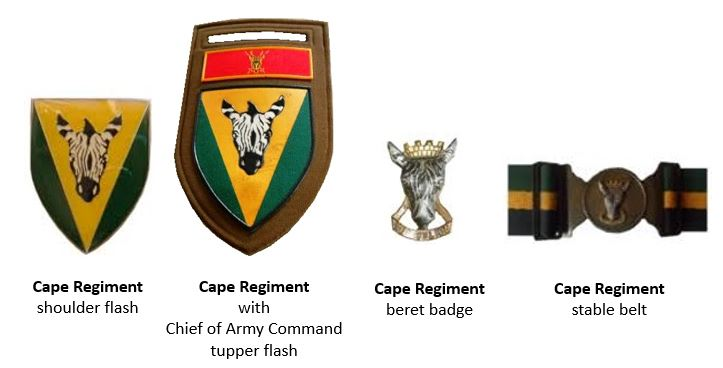
SADF era Cape Regiment insignia circa 1980s

== Corps symbols ==
- Corps badge: Although there were numerous variants, the Corps badges of the 1915 - 1991 era all consisted of the Crest of the Arms of the Cape of Good Hope Colony, i.e. the figure of Hope with her left hand resting on an anchor and her right hand or elbow resting on Table Mountain, with an inscribed scroll below. During 1915 to 1945 the inscription read "CAPE CORPS", while during 1963 to 1991 it read "FORTITER ET FIDELITER". The figure of Hope also appeared on the gorgets of the Dutch Cape regiments up to 1795.
- Corps motto: Fortiter et fideliter (Bravely and faithfully) (1963–1991).

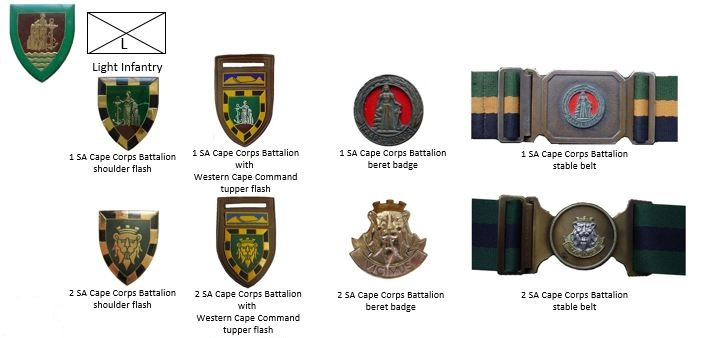
SADF era SA Corps Battalions insignia

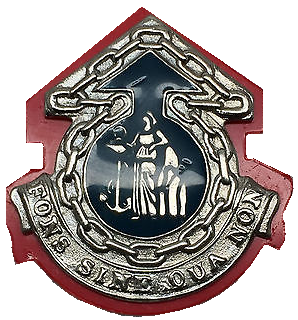
SACC Logistic unit beret badge

== Battle honours ==
- Awarded to the Cape Mounted Riflemen:
  - Cape of Good Hope (awarded in 1841 for service in the Fourth, Fifth and Sixth Kaffir Wars).

Battle Honours
Awarded to the Cape Mounted Riflemen

- Awarded to the 1915 Cape Corps:
  - Battle of Kilimanjaro
  - Battle of Behobeho
  - Battle of Nyangao
  - East Africa 1916-1917
  - East Africa 1917-1918
  - Megiddo 1918
  - Nablus
  - Palestine 1918

Battle Honours
Awarded to the 1915 Cape Corps
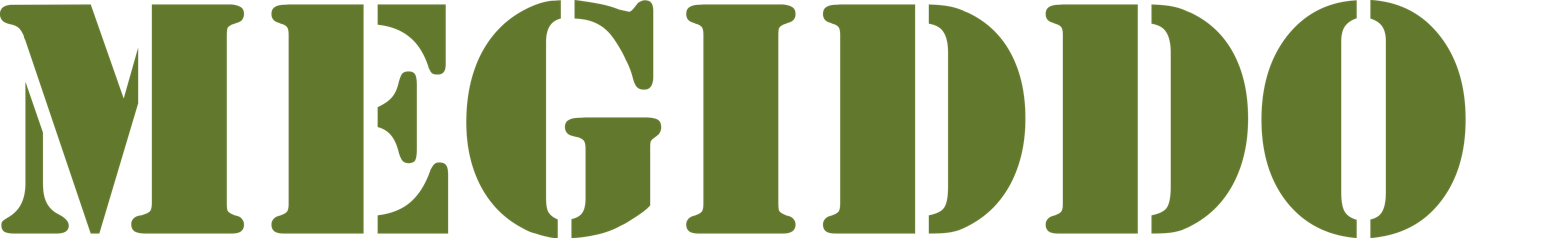

The 1915 Cape Corps did not inherit the battle honour of the Cape Mounted Riflemen.

== Operations ==
The Cape Corps' most famous combat operation is the Battle of Square Hill, part of the preliminary fighting for the Battle of Nablus, which took place in what was then known as Palestine on 16, 17 and 18 September 1918. It was this battle in particular which earned the Cape Corps its combat reputation and for which the Palestine 1918 Battle Honour was awarded.

While known as the SACC this unit served regularly in Namibia during the South African Border War.

== See also ==
- Military history of South Africa
