= Cornelis Jacob van de Graaff =

Dutch States Army officer and colonial administrator

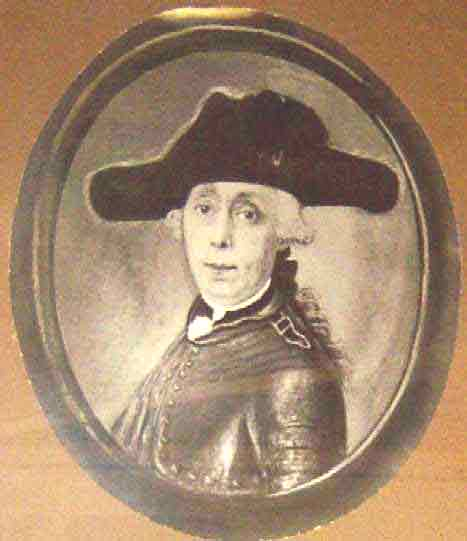

Governor of the Cape
- In office 14 February 1785 – 24 June 1791
- Preceded by: Joachim van Plettenberg
- Succeeded by: Johan Isaac Rhenius (acting)

Personal details
- Born: 30 March 1734 Netherlands
- Died: 21 April 1812 (aged 78) Neuwied, Prussia
- Spouse: Hester Cornelia Reynet

Cornelis Jacob van de Graaff (30 March 1734 – 21 April 1812) was a Dutch States Army officer and colonial administrator who served as governor of the Cape from 1785 to 1791.

== Career ==
Van de Graaff followed in his father's footsteps and entered the Dutch cavalry but was in the engineering corps when he was appointed engineer extraordinary at 's-Hertogenbosch in April 1759. In 1784 he left for the Cape Colony as an engineer 2nd Class with the rank of lieutenant-colonel, as comptroller-general of fortifications in the province of Holland.

Van de Graaff was appointed Governor at the Cape with the intention of making the colonists feel more satisfied. He arrived with his family in Table Bay on 22 January 1785 and officially took over from Joachim van Plettenberg on 14 February and quickly began to make sweeping changes in the defence system at the Cape. To improve the fortifications, two batteries were erected at Rogge Bay and additions were made to the Chavonnes Battery. The building of these was supervised by the engineers Louis Thibault and D. M. Barbier. They were also responsible for drafting the plans, and a new hospital at the Cape was commenced under their guidance.

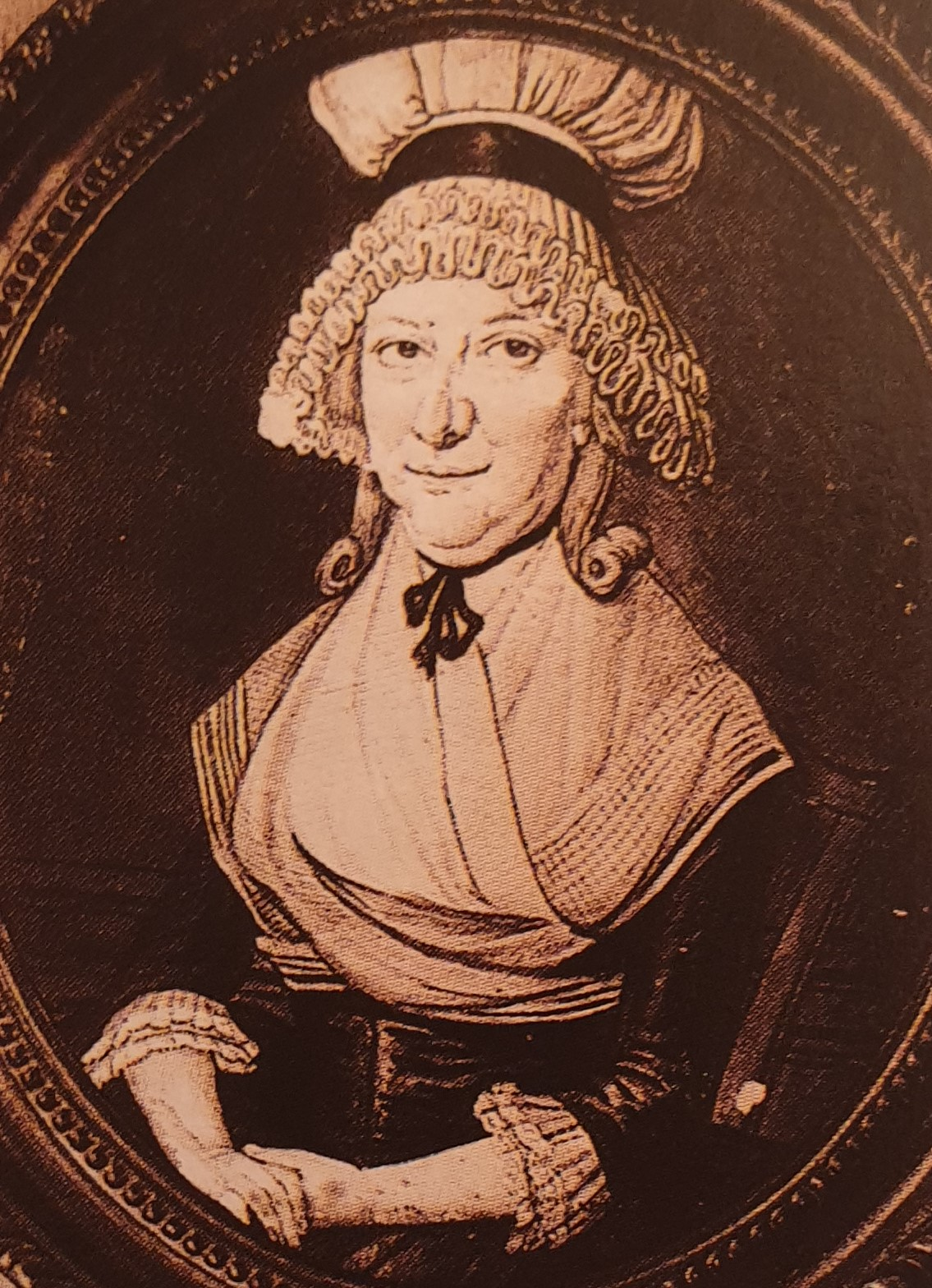
Hester Cornelia Reynet, the wife of Cornelis Jacob van de Graeff

Van de Graaff started a military training institution, aiming to improve the artillery service and protect the Cape. Thibault also lectured in military science and mathematics at the military school. The defence system of the northern and eastern frontiers and the local government of the Colony were strengthened by the establishment in 1786 of the Graaff-Reinet district, named after Van de Graaff and his wife.

However, the economy at the Cape Colony deteriorated and although Van de Graaff lived in luxury, inflation soared and Van de Graaff as Governor, issued so much paper money that the quantity multiplied five times in as many years. The money was used to finance the building of the hospital and the fortifications. In 1785 a delegation of Cape Patriots was sent to the Netherlands to plead the cause of the colonists before the States General as the people of the Cape felt they were not getting the necessary support from the Governor. In April 1786, a petition was filed on this, but the States General was unwilling to interfere with the affairs of the VOC. On 14 October 1790, the Lords XVII decided to recall Van de Graaff and on 24 June 1791 he and his family, left the Cape.

== Personal ==
Van de Graaff was the eldest son of Sebastiaan van de Graaff, a major in the Dutch Cavalry Regiment of Hop, and his wife, Geertruid van Vinceler. He married Hester Cornelia Reynet in Gouda during October 1766. Two sons and two daughters were born from the marriage. Van de Graaff resigned from the Dutch military service in 1795, at the time of the revolution in the Netherlands, and fled to Prussia, where he later died.

== See also ==
- 1780s in South Africa
