= Johan Isaac Rhenius =

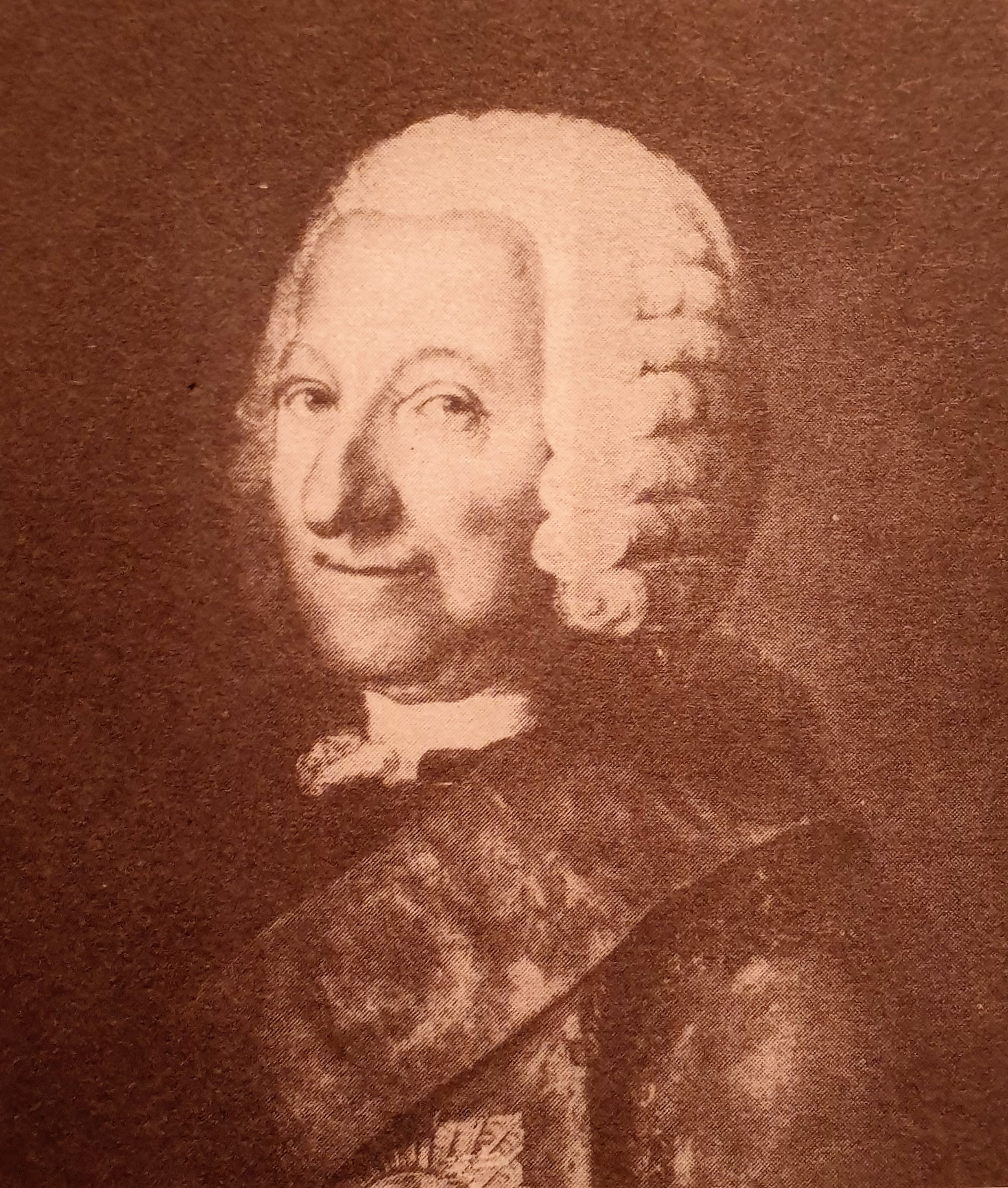

Acting Governor of the Dutch Cape Colony
- In office 24 June 1791 – 3 July 1792
- Preceded by: Cornelis Jacob van de Graaff
- Succeeded by: Sebastiaan Cornelis Nederburgh and Simon Hendrik Frijkenius (Commissioners-General)

Personal details
- Born: 1750 Dutch Cape Colony
- Died: 27 July 1808 (aged 57–58) Germany

Johan Isaac Rhenius (1750 – 27 July 1808), Cape official and acting Governor of the Cape Colony between 1791 and 1792.

== Career ==
Rhenius became secunde at the Cape Colony in August 1786 and after the departure of Cornelis Jacob van de Graaff was appointed acting governor on 24 June 1791. On the 2nd of March 1792, Rhenius signed a proclamation that formed the basis of the establishment of a postal service at the Cape Colony. He acted as governor until 3 July 1792, when authority was taken over by Sebastiaan Cornelis Nederburgh and Simon Hendrik Frijkenius, in their capacity as Commissioners-General.

He continued as secunde and when the British occupied the Cape, Rhenius make himself available as an official to serve under the British. In 1795 he was appointed Receiver-General and Treasurer and was also re-appointed as Commissaris-Politiek, a position he had held under the VOC. His task was to represent the government at Church meetings and to ensure that the church did not exceed its powers. In 1803 the Cape Colony was handed over to the Batavian Republic and Rhenius left the Cape for Germany.

== Personal ==
Rhenius was the son of Johannes Theophilus Rhenius, the first magistrate of Swellendam and his wife Helena Maria van der Heuvel. He married Dorothea Hendriks Cruijwagen on 10 September 1786 and the couple had no children.

== See also ==
- 1790s in South Africa
