= Slesvigske musikkorps =

Danish military brass band

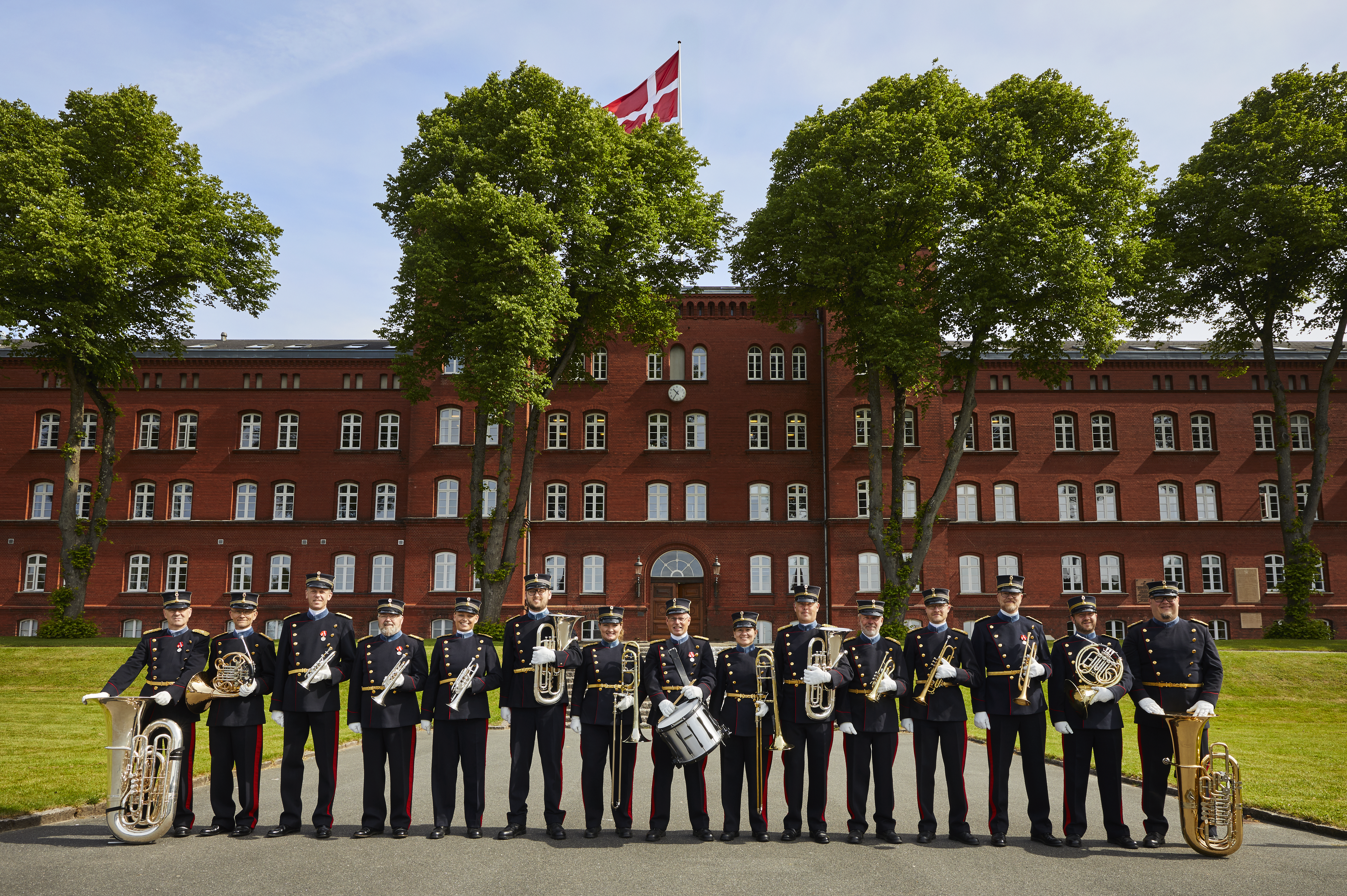
The entire band.

Slesvigske musikkorps (Schleswig Military band or SMuK, which means beautiful in Danish) is a Danish NATO military brass band based out of the base in Haderslev Kaserne, also home to the Schleswig Foot Regiment.

The band is made up of 17 members. 1 conductor, 4 cornet players (one plays piccolo trumpet, B♭ trumpet and E♭ cornet; another sings and plays piano, another plays the flugelhorn too), 2 B♭ trumpet and flugelhorn players, 2 French Horns, 2 euphoniums (one also plays trombone), 2 trombone players (not including the one just mentioned), 2 tubas (one also plays bass guitar), and 2 drummers.

The band started in 1778 serving Prince Frederick VI of Denmark in Hessens Hof at Gottorp Castle. After the war in 1864, the Second Schleswig War, they played for several years for Kronborg Castle, which had become a military installation. After the reunification, they were garrisoned in Sønderborg. Finally, in 1953, they settled down in Haderslev.

== Sources ==
- Slesvigske musikkorps website (Danish)
