= Invasion of the Cape Colony =

1795 invasion of the War of the First Coalition

- Part of the War of the First Coalition
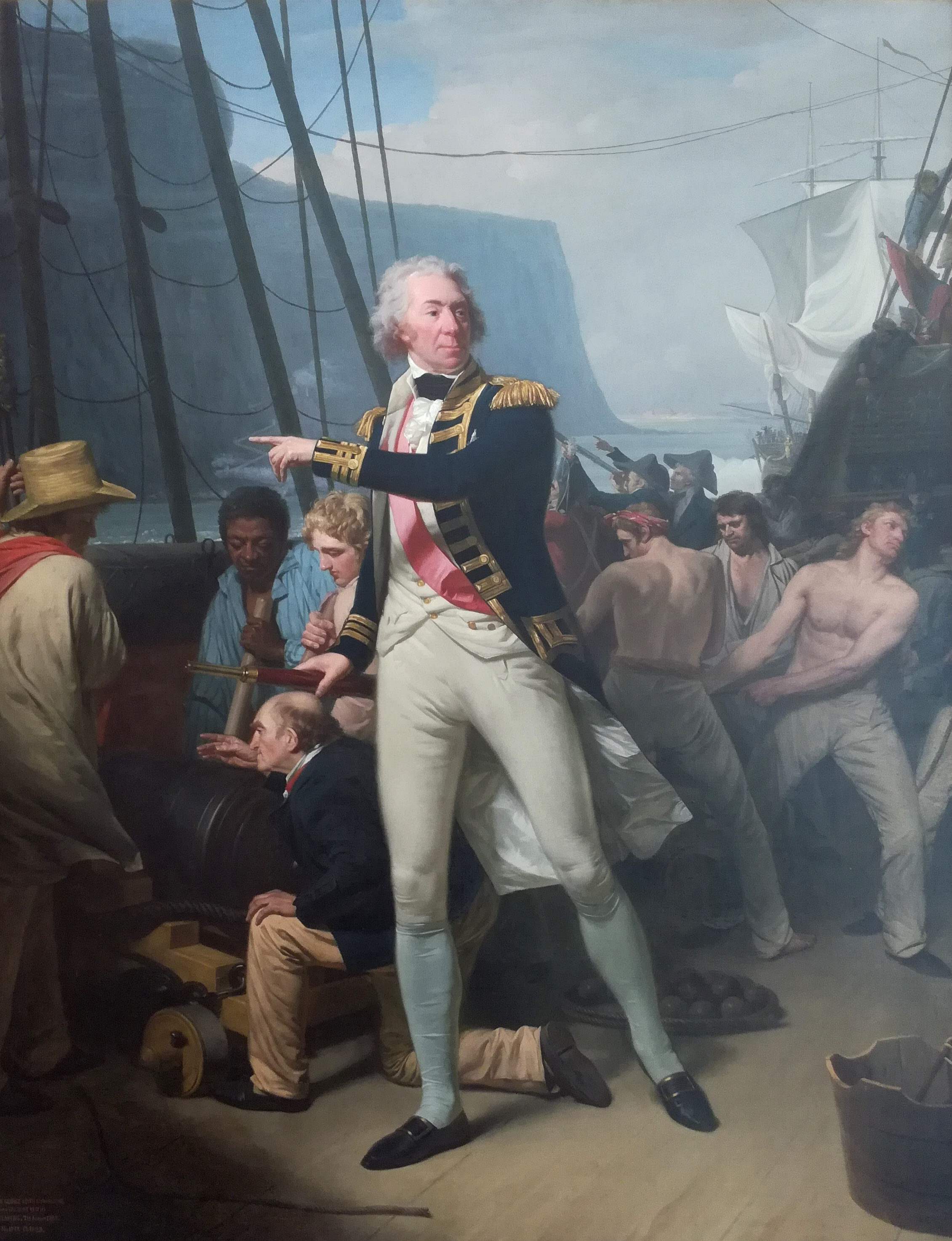
- Painting of George Elphinstone onboard HMS Monarch during the invasion
Date	10 June – 15 September 1795
Location	Dutch Cape Colony
Result	British victory
Territorial changes	British occupation of the Dutch Cape Colony

Belligerents
Great Britain	Dutch East India Company

Commanders and leaders
George Elphinstone; James Henry Craig	Abraham Sluysken (surrendered); Robert Gordon (surrendered)

Strength
1,800 regulars; 5 ships of the line; 2 sloops; 14 troopships	3,600 regulars and militia; 1 frigate; 1 brig

Casualties and losses
4–5 killed; 54 wounded	Unknown killed, wounded or captured; 1 frigate captured; 1 brig captured

The invasion of the Cape Colony, also known as the Battle of Muizenberg (Dutch: Slag om Muizenberg), was a British military expedition launched in 1795 against the Dutch Cape Colony at the Cape of Good Hope. The Cape Colony, established and controlled by the Dutch East India Company in the 17th century, was at the time the only viable South African port for ships making the journey from Europe to the European colonies in the East Indies. It therefore held vital strategic importance, although it was otherwise economically insignificant.

In Winter 1794, during the Flanders campaign, French troops overran the Dutch Republic, which was transformed into a French client state known as the Batavian Republic. In response, Britain launched several expeditions against Dutch colonies, including the Cape Colony. The expedition to the Cape set sail under Vice-Admiral of the Red Sir George Elphinstone in April 1795, arriving off Simon's Town in June. Attempts were made to negotiate a settlement with the colonial government, but talks achieved nothing and British forces made an amphibious landing on 7 August. A short battle was fought at Muizenberg, and skirmishing between British and Dutch forces continued until September when a larger British force landed. With Cape Town under threat, Governor Abraham Josias Sluysken surrendered the colony.

Elphinstone subsequently strengthened the garrison against counterattack and stationed a Royal Navy squadron off the port. Almost a year later a Batavian Navy squadron reached the colony only to find that it was badly outnumbered, and surrendered without a fight. The British occupation continued until the Peace of Amiens in 1802 when it was returned to the Dutch. In 1806, during the Napoleonic Wars, a second British invasion reoccupied the colony after the Battle of Blaauwberg and it remained a British colony until the establishment of the Union of South Africa in 1910.

== Background ==
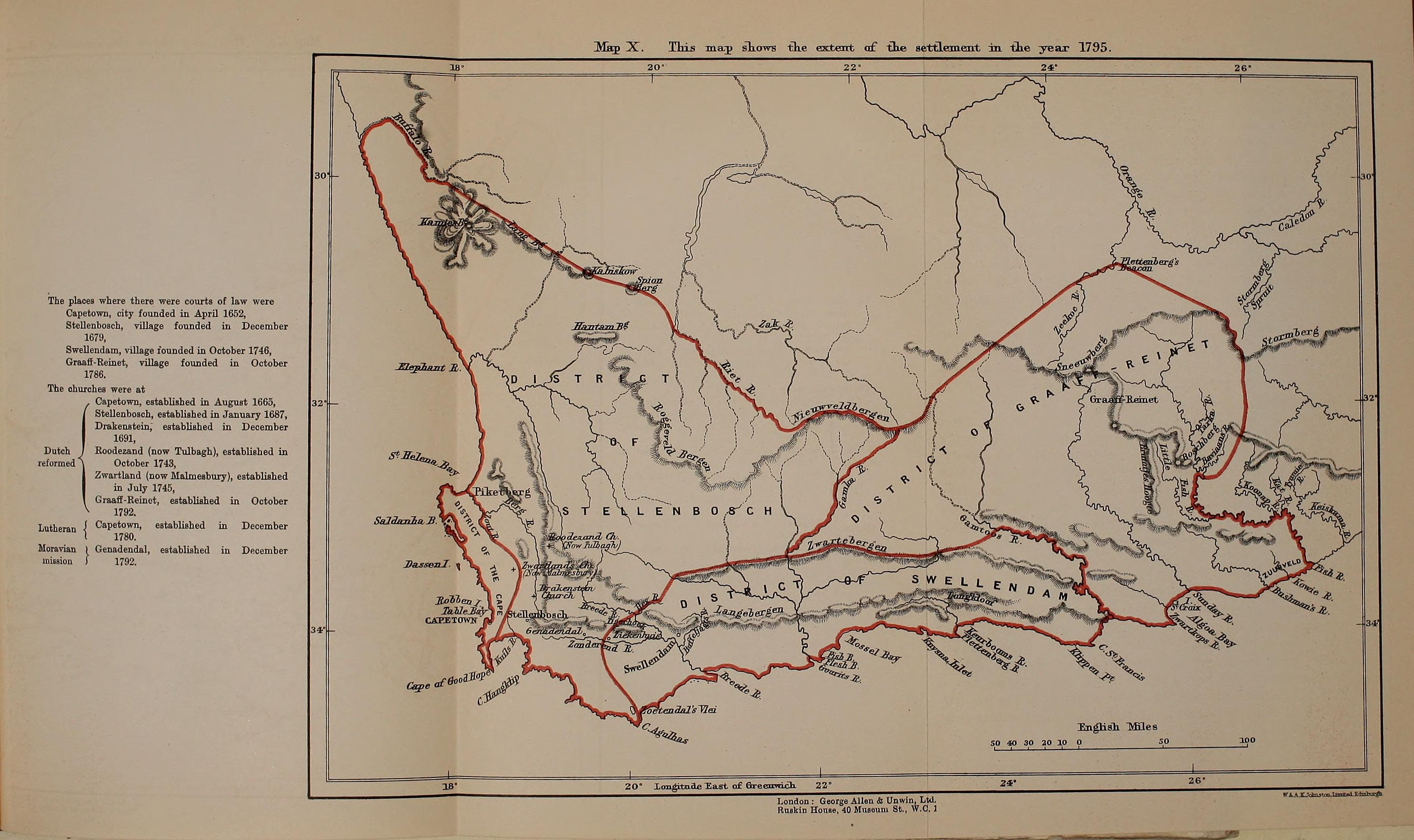
Map of the Dutch Cape Colony in 1795

The War of the First Coalition which began in April 1792 expanded on 1 February 1793 when Revolutionary France declared war on the Dutch Republic and Britain. This brought the war to the Indian Ocean, where Britain and the Dutch Republic both held lucrative colonies. British and Dutch trade routes in the region were threatened by French warships and privateers operating out of the colony of Isle de France but were protected off the Southern African coast by the Dutch Cape Colony. Situated at the Cape of Good Hope, the Cape Colony had been founded in 1652 to offer a harbour for ships traveling between Europe and the East Indies, and in the 1790s it remained the only such station between Rio de Janeiro and British India.

The Cape Colony was administered from two towns, the larger Cape Town on the wide Table Bay facing west and smaller Simon's Town on False Bay facing north. Neither bay was sheltered from Atlantic storms and both were notoriously dangerous, with winds, currents and rocks posing considerable threats to shipping. Beyond its importance as a resupply port for European ships, the colony had little economic value in the 1790s, and was defended by a 3,600-strong garrison of approximately 1,000 VOC regular troops supplemented by Boer commandos and the Pandour Corps under the overall command of Governor Abraham Josias Sluysken and Colonel Robert Jacob Gordon. The garrison, centered on the Castle of Good Hope, operated from a series of coastal fortifications which protected Table Bay. False Bay was more weakly defended, covered by only two lightly armed batteries.

In the winter of 1794–1795, French troops invaded Holland and occupied Amsterdam. The Stadtholder William V fled to England in January 1795 and the Dutch Republic was reconstituted as the Batavian Republic by local revolutionaries. In England William issued the Kew Letters instructing Dutch colonial authorities to cooperate with any invasion forces Britain might send. At the urging of Sir Francis Baring, Secretary of State for War Henry Dundas authorised an expedition to occupy the Cape Colony and eliminate the potential threat it posed to British trade with the East Indies. The British Admiralty sent two squadrons to the colony on 3 April 1795, one under Vice-Admiral of the Red Sir George Elphinstone and the other under Commodore John Blankett, carrying 515 troops of soldiers from the 78th Regiment of Foot under Major-general Sir James Henry Craig. A larger force under General Alured Clarke was instructed to follow these squadrons on 15 May with troops and supplies for a longer campaign, with orders to hold at Salvador, Brazil until requested.

== Invasion ==
Location of events during the invasion.

Blankett and Elphinstone united off the Cape on 10 June 1795 and anchored in Simon's Bay. There messages were sent to Sluysken offering an alliance against the French. The Dutch governor was inclined to resist however, evacuating the civilian population from Simon's Town in early July and making preparations to raze the town. To prevent this, Craig landed 800 soldiers and marines on 14 July, who occupied Simon's Town while the Dutch withdrew to the pass at Muizenberg, through which passed the road to Cape Town. For the next month the two armies observed an uneasy truce, broken by occasional patrols and sniping. During this period, Elphinstone and Sluysken continued negotiations for the surrender of the colony. These negotiations were stalled by disputes in the colonial government regarding the legitimacy of the deposed William of Orange and suspicion concerning British intentions. While the debates continued, British envoys were permitted free movement in Cape Town, making detailed observations of the defences.

Elphinstone became concerned that the Dutch positions were too strong for his forces to overwhelm, and on 19 June he sent HMS Sphinx to request assistance from Clarke's fleet. On 7 August, with negotiations stalled, Elphinstone ordered an attack on the pass at Muizenberg. Craig's forces were supplemented with 1,000 sailors from Elphinstone's squadron redeployed on land under captains Temple Hardy and John William Spranger. Among this force were a number of American citizens who immediately deserted to the Dutch and were promised repatriation. At noon on 7 August, HMS America, HMS Stately, HMS Echo and HMS Rattlesnake opened fire on Dutch forward positions. Return fire from Dutch field guns killed two men on America and wounded three more, while Craig's troops were able to advance against the Dutch positions and seize them, with the Dutch defenders falling back in confusion. A second attack by soldiers of the 78th captured a rocky height nearby and a Dutch counterattack the following morning was driven off by Hardy's sailors and marines.

The Dutch fell back to Wynberg but British forces were not strong enough to advance, suffering shortages of food and ammunition. Elphinstone's positions were, however, improved by reinforcements, which arrived in the Arniston on 9 August, as well as disorganisation in the Dutch command resulting in stalemate. The British commander subsequently authorised the seizure of five Dutch East Indiamen merchant ships at anchor at Simon's Town on 18 August. Skirmishing continued throughout the month, with stronger Dutch attacks on 1 and 2 September followed by a larger planned assault on Simon's Town on 3 September in which Sluysken committed all his reserves including 18 cannons. That morning, 14 East India Company ships were seen arriving in Simon's Bay and the attack was cancelled. These ships were the reinforcement fleet under Clarke, who landed 4,000 troops from the 95th and 98th Regiments of Foot, the 2nd Battalions of the 78th and 84th Regiments of Foot, and a contingent of EIC troops from Saint Helena, at Simon's Town for an overland campaign against Cape Town. Clarke's army then advanced against Dutch piquets, losing one killed and 17 wounded in skirmishes. To support this operation, Elphinstone sent America, Rattlesnake, Echo and the Indiaman Bombay Castle to blockade Cape Town and provide artillery support. Outnumbered and surrounded, Sluysken requested a 48-hour truce from Clarke, but was given a 24-hour ultimatum to surrender. Seeing no alternative, the Dutch governor passed control of his colony to the British on 15 September 1795, although he allowed approximately 40 British deserters in Cape Town, mostly impressed Americans, to escape into the countryside before the deadline passed.

=== Elphinstone's order of battle ===
Elphinstone's squadron
Ship	Rate	Guns	Navy	Commander
HMS Monarch	Third rate	74	Royal Navy	Vice-Admiral Sir George Keith Elphinstone; Captain John Elphinstone
HMS Victorious	Third rate	74	Royal Navy	Captain William Clark
HMS Arrogant	Third rate	74	Royal Navy	Captain Richard Lucas
HMS America	Third rate	64	Royal Navy	Captain John Blankett
HMS Stately	Third rate	64	Royal Navy	Captain Billy Douglas
HMS Echo	Ship-Sloop	16	Royal Navy	Captain Temple Hardy
HMS Rattlesnake	Ship-Sloop	16	Royal Navy	Captain John William Spranger
Source: James 2002, p. 300

== Aftermath ==
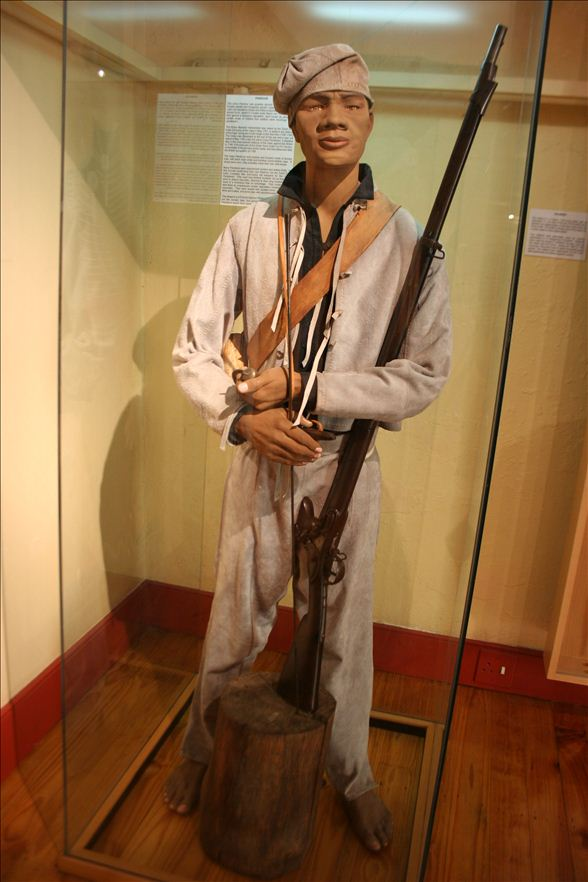
Model of a private of the Pandour Corps, which was disbanded after the invasion

The British reported their losses at four killed and 54 wounded, though one academic source claimed they suffered at least five men killed. Among the Dutch ships captured was the 14-gun brig Star. The British took Star into service as HMS Hope. Elphinstone's substantial squadron remained on station at the Cape to deter efforts to recapture the colony. Parts of this force were subsequently deployed to bolster British forces in the Indian Ocean. The blockade of Île de France was restored and Arrogant and Victorious were sent to the Dutch East Indies where they would fight an inconclusive battle with a French squadron off Sumatra in September 1796.

Elphinstone sailed for Madras, where he received reports that a Batavian Navy squadron had sailed from Europe to retake the Cape Colony. Returning to Cape Town, Elphinstone assembled a large squadron to await the Dutch arrival. Further reports revealed the strength and progress of the Dutch and Elphinstone had ample time to prepare his squadron for their arrival and increase the garrison ashore. The Batavian squadron's commander, Schout-bij-nacht Engelbertus Lucas Sr., spent almost six months on the passage and gathered no intelligence on British defences. Thus when he arrived off the Cape he was soon discovered by Elphinstone in Saldanha Bay and intimidated into surrendering without a fight.

No further attacks on the Cape Colony were made during the course of the war. Elphinstone returned to Britain in October 1796 and was subsequently awarded the title of Baron Keith for his service in the capture and defence of the Cape, a reward that historian C. Northcote Parkinson calls "on the whole, easily earned". At the Peace of Amiens, in 1802, one of the treaty terms returned the Cape Colony, along with all captured Dutch colonies except Ceylon, to the Batavian Republic. The peace was short-lived, and after the outbreak of the Napoleonic Wars in 1803 a second British invasion was planned, executed in 1806 and victory secured following the Battle of Blaauwberg. The Cape Colony remained part of the British Empire until its independence as part of a unified South Africa in 1910.
