= Schleswig Regiment of Foot =

- Slesvigske Fodregiment
- Active: 1778–2001; 2019–present
- Disbanded: 1 January 2001
- Country: Denmark
- Branch: Royal Danish Army
- Role: Motorized infantry (1961-2000); Light infantry (2019-)
- Size: Four battalions (1961-2000); Two battalion (2019-)
- Garrison/HQ: Haderslev Kaserne
- Mottos: Vaagen og tro (Vigilant and Faithful)

Commanders
- Current commander: Col Kåre Jakobsen

Insignia
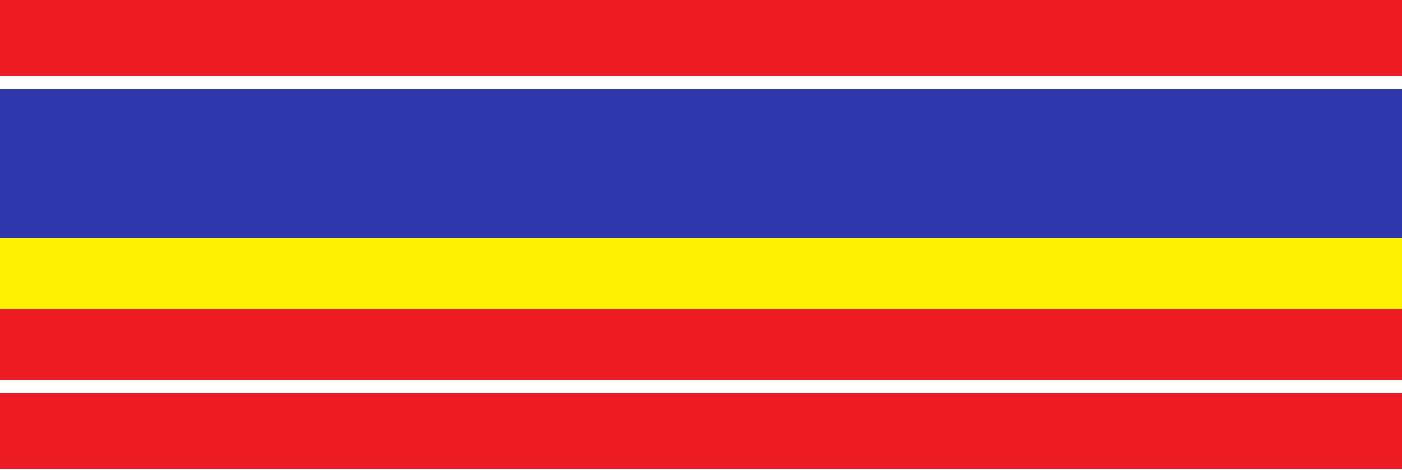
- Regimental belt

- Colours

The Schleswig Regiment of Foot (Danish: Slesvigske Fodregiment) is a Royal Danish Army infantry regiment. On 1 January 2001, the regiment was merged with the Queen's Life Regiment to form the Prince's Life Regiment. In 2018, it was announced that the regiment would be reestablished on 1 January 2019 as a light infantry battalion.

== History ==
The Schleswig Regiment of Foot traces its history back to 1778 when it was raised from personnel from existing Regiments. Until 1842 it was garrisoned in Schleswig, until 1854 in Fredericia, until 1923 in Copenhagen and thereafter in Haderslev. From 1960's to 1997 the regiment only had infantry battalions, in 1997 it was upgraded with one mechanised infantry battalion.

The Regiment participated in the Napoleonic Wars (first as part of the Danish mobile auxiliary force, commanded by Prince Frederik of Hesse and under supreme command of Marechal L.N. Davout, and then as part of the Allied Forces against Napoleon under supreme command of Wellington), First Schleswig War (1848–1850) and Second Schleswig War (1864). The regimental flag has the battle honours Boden 1813 and Isted 1850. The fighting at Boden occurred near Oldesloe in Holstein in early December, less than a week before the 1813 Battle of Bornhöved. Since 26 March 1949 the flag carried the name Slesvigske Fodregiment.

On 1 November 1991 the Funen Life Regiment and the King's Jutlandic Regiment of Foot were merged into the regiment. In 2000 the regiment, with all battalions, was merged into the Prince's Life Regiment.

In 2019, the regiment was revived along with the Danish Artillery Regiment. When the regiment was reestablished it consisted of one battalion of the line (13th(XIII/SLFR)) and one reserve battalion (22nd(XXII/SLFR)). Both were reactivated with historical numbers. If the regiment is expanded the battalion numbers will most likely be 18th(XVIII/SLFR) and 3rd(III/SLFR)

== Organisation ==
The regiment itself has one active battalion, one reserve battalion and a Musical Corps:

- Schleswig Regiment of Foot, in Haderslev
  - XIII Light Infantry Battalion, Schleswig Regiment of Foot (XIII/SLFR Lette Infanteribataljon), in Haderslev
    - Staff Company
    - 1st Light Infantry Company
    - 2nd Light Infantry Company
    - 3rd Light Infantry Company
    - 4th Training Company
  - XXII Reserve Battalion, Schleswig Regiment of Foot (XXII/SLFR Reservebataljon), in Haderslev
  - Infantry Service Branch Inspector Element(Tjenestegrens-inspektørelementet), in Haderslev
  - Schleswig Music Corps (Slesvigske Musikkorps - SMuK), in Haderslev

Disbanded units

- 1st battalion (I/SLFR), Raised 1961, disbanded 2000. Motorized Infantry Battalion (from 1997 to 2000 Mechanized Infantry).
- 2nd battalion (II/SLFR), Raised 1961, disbanded 2000. Infantry Battalion.
- 3rd battalion (III/SLFR), Raised 1961, disbanded 2000. Infantry Battalion.(the number "3rd battalion" is used by the soldiers-association of the regiment)
- 4th battalion (IV/SLFR), amalgamated with Funen Life Regiment in 1991, disbanded 2000. Motorized Infantry Battalion.
- 3rd Brigade Staff Company/3rd Jutland Brigade. Raised 1961, disbanded 2000.

== Names of the regiment ==
Names
Fyenske Infanteriregiment	Funen Infantry Regiment	1778-10-01	–	1785
Slesvigske Infanteriregiment	Schleswig Infantry Regiment	1785	–	1842
13. Linie Infanteribataillon	13th Line Infantry Battalion	1842	–	1860
13. Infanteribataillon	13th Infantry Battalion	1860	–	1863
13. Infanteriregiment	13th Infantry Regiment	1863	–	1865
13. Infanteribataillon	13th Infantry Battalion	1865	–	1867
13. Bataillon	13th Battalion	1867	–	1951
2. Regiment	2nd Regiment	1951-11-01	–	1961-11-01
Slesvigske Fodregiment	Schleswig Regiment of Foot	1961-11-01	–	2001-01-01
Disbanded	Disbanded	2001-01-01	–	2019-02-08
Slesvigske Fodregiment	Schleswig Regiment of Foot	2019-02-08	–	Present

== Standards ==
Historical standards of the regiment

Funen Infantry Regiment
(1779–1785)

Schleswig Infantry Regiment
(1790–1842)

13th Battalion
(1912–1947)
