= Abraham Josias Sluysken =

Dutch colonial administrator

Commissioner-General of the Dutch Cape Colony
- In office 2 September 1793 – 14 September 1795
- Preceded by: Sebastiaan Cornelis Nederburgh and Simon Hendrik Frijkenius (Commissioners-General)

Personal details
- Born: 3 December 1736 Deventer
- Died: 18 January 1799 (aged 62) The Hague

Abraham Josias Sluysken (3 December 1736 – 18 January 1799) was a Dutch colonial administrator who served as the last Governor of the Dutch Cape Colony before British occupation in 1795. Sluysken was born in the Dutch Republic, and in 1765 became governor of the Dutch trading colony of Dutch Suratte on the northwest coast of India. He was sent to the Cape in 1793. With his eye on defense in the case of a possible French attack, Sluysken commissioned the construction of a few small forts at Simon's Town in 1794. The following year, the citizens of Swellendam and Graaff-Reinet revolted and declared their independence from the Cape. In June, British forces launched an invasion of the Cape Colony, and after Sluysken unsuccessfully attempted to defend the colony he surrendered to the invaders on 14 September 1795. Sluysken returned to Holland on 12 November.

Verhaal gehouden bij den Commissaris van de Caap de Goede Hoop, his account of the events that took place between 10 June and 16 September, was published in 1797. Sluysken died on 18 January 1799.
