= Light infantry =

Type of mobile infantry

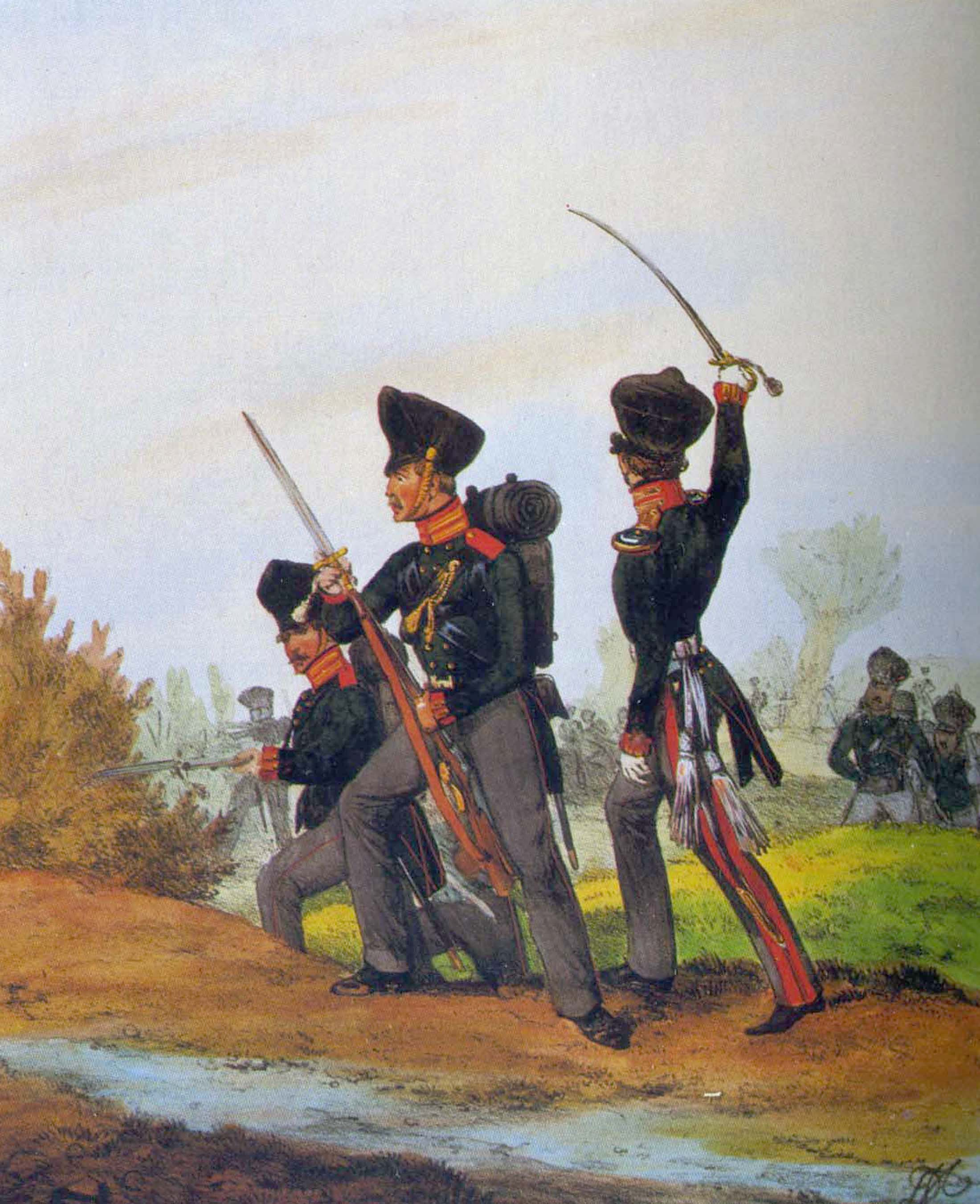
Jägers of the Electorate of Hesse between 1835 and 1843

Light infantry refers to certain types of lightly equipped infantry throughout history. They have a more mobile or fluid function than other types of infantry, such as heavy infantry or line infantry. Historically, light infantry often fought as scouts, raiders, and skirmishers. These are loose formations that fight ahead of the main army to harass, delay, disrupt supply lines, engage the enemy's own skirmishing forces, and generally "soften up" an enemy before the main battle. Light infantrymen were also often responsible for screening the main body of a military formation.

Following World War II, the term "light infantry" has evolved to include rapid-deployment units (including commando and airborne units) that emphasize speed and mobility over armor and firepower. Some units or battalions that historically held a skirmishing role retain their designation "light infantry" for the sake of tradition.

== History ==
=== Ancient history ===
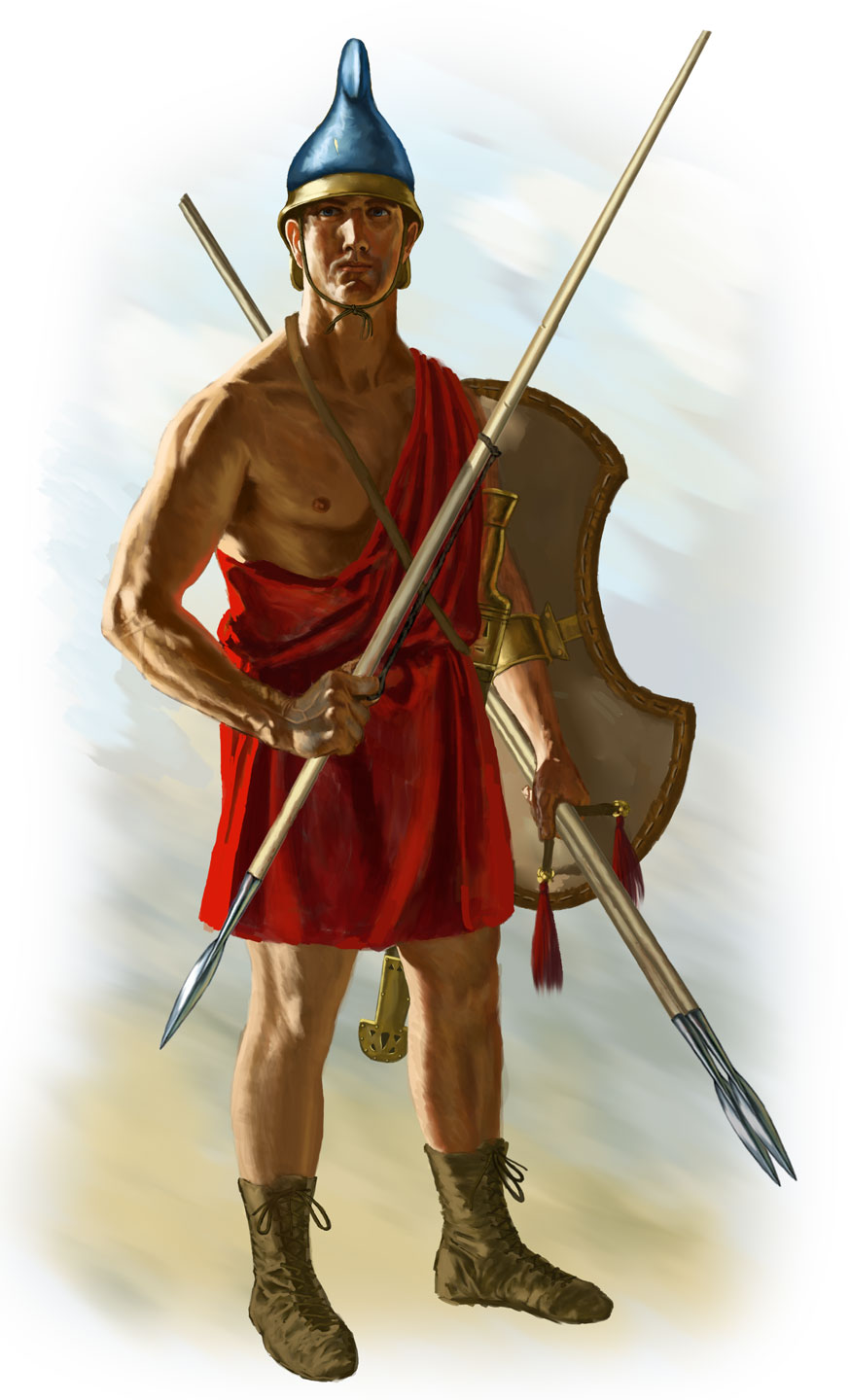
Agrianian peltast, c. 4th century BC

The concept of a skirmishing screen is a very old one and was already well-established in Ancient Greece and Roman times in the form, for example, of the Greek peltast and psiloi, and the Roman velites. As with the so-called "light infantry" of later periods, the term more adequately describes the role of such infantry rather than the actual weight of their equipment. Peltast equipment, for example, grew steadily heavier at the same time as hoplite equipment grew lighter. It was that peltasts fought in open order as skirmishers that made them light infantry and that hoplites fought in the battle line in a phalanx formation that made them heavy infantry.

=== Modern history ===
Early regular armies of the modern era frequently relied on irregulars to perform the duties of light infantry skirmishers. In particular, the French Army employed detachments of German and Balkan mercenaries to serve as patrols in the rough country until a permanent corps of Mountain Fusiliers (Fusiliers des Montagnes) was raised in the 1740s. In the 17th century, dragoons were sometimes employed as the skirmishers of their day, as mounted infantrymen who rode into battle but dismounted to fight, giving them a mobility lacking to regular foot soldiers.

In the 18th and 19th centuries most infantry regiments or battalions had a light company as an integral part of their composition. Its members were often smaller, more agile men with high shooting ability and capability of using initiative. They did not usually fight in disciplined ranks as did the ordinary infantry but often in widely dispersed groups, necessitating an understanding of skirmish warfare. They were expected to avoid melee engagements unless necessary and would fight ahead of the mainline to harass the enemy before falling back to the main position. During the period 1777–1781, the Continental Army of the United States adopted the British Army practice of seasonally drafting light infantry regiments as temporary units during active field operations, by combining existing light infantry companies detached from their parent regiments.

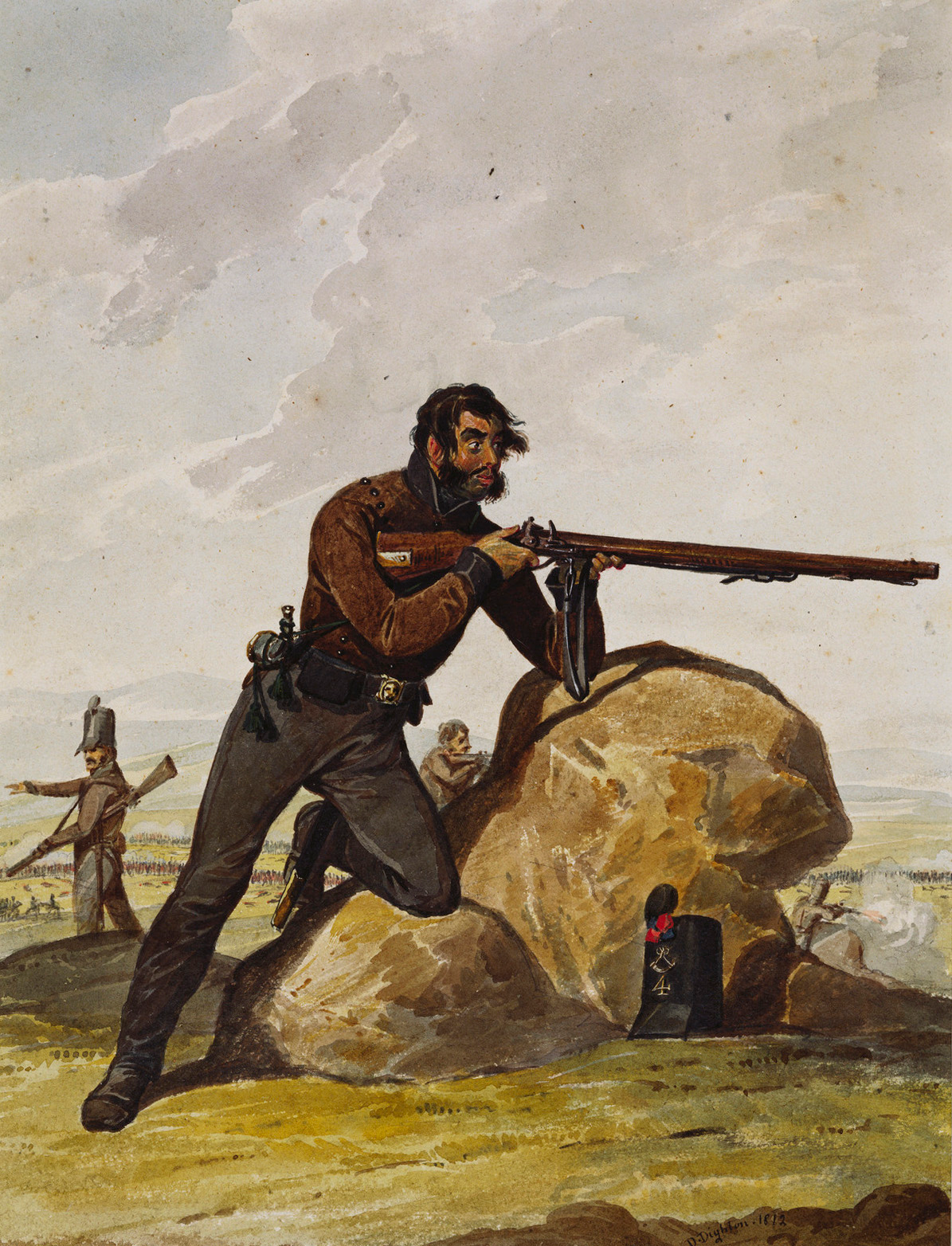
1812 painting of a Portuguese Caçador

Light infantry sometimes carried lighter muskets than ordinary infantrymen while others carried rifles and wore rifle green uniforms. These became designated as rifle regiments in Britain and Jäger and Schützen (sharpshooter) regiments in German-speaking Europe. In France, during the Napoleonic Wars, light infantry were called voltigeurs and chasseurs and the sharpshooters tirailleurs. The Austrian army had Grenzer regiments from the middle of the 18th century, who originally served as irregular militia skirmishers recruited from frontier areas. They were gradually absorbed into the line infantry becoming a hybrid type that proved successful against the French, to the extent that Napoleon recruited several units of Austrian army Grenzer to his own army after victory over Austria in 1809 compelled the Austrians to cede territories from which they were traditionally recruited. In Portugal, 1797, companies of Caçadores (Hunters) were created in the Portuguese Army, and in 1808 led to the formation of independent "Caçador" battalions that became known for their ability to perform precision shooting at long distances.

Light infantry officers sometimes carried muskets or rifles, rather than pistols, and their swords were light curved sabres; as opposed to the heavy, straighter swords of other infantry officers. Orders were sent by bugle or whistle instead of drums (since the sound of a bugle carries further and it is difficult to move fast when carrying a drum). Some armies, including the British and French, recruited whole regiments (or converted existing ones) of light infantry. These were considered elite units, since they required specialised training with emphasis on self-discipline, manoeuvre and initiative to carry out the roles of light infantry as well as those of ordinary infantry.

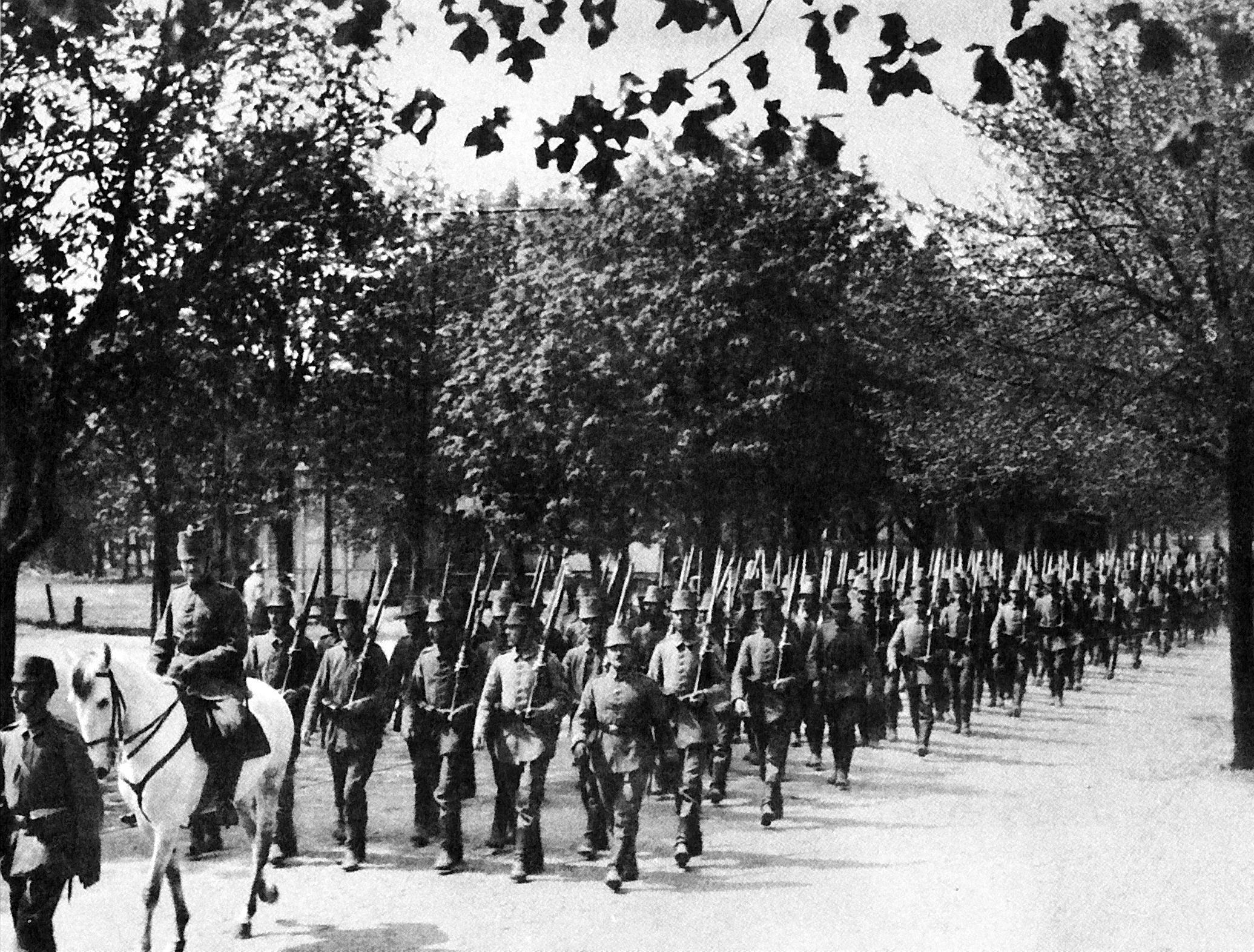
The pioneer company of the Imperial German Army's 27th Jäger Battalion returning from a parade in Liepāja, 1917

By the late 19th century, the concept of fighting in formation was on the wane due to advancements in weaponry and the distinctions between light and heavy infantry began to disappear. Essentially, all infantry became light infantry in operational practice. Some regiments retained the name and customs, but there was in effect little difference between them and other infantry regiments. On the eve of World War I, the British Army included seven light infantry regiments. These differed from other infantry only in maintaining such traditional distinctions as badges that included a bugle-horn, dark green home service helmets for full dress, and a fast-stepping parade ground march.

=== Contemporary ===
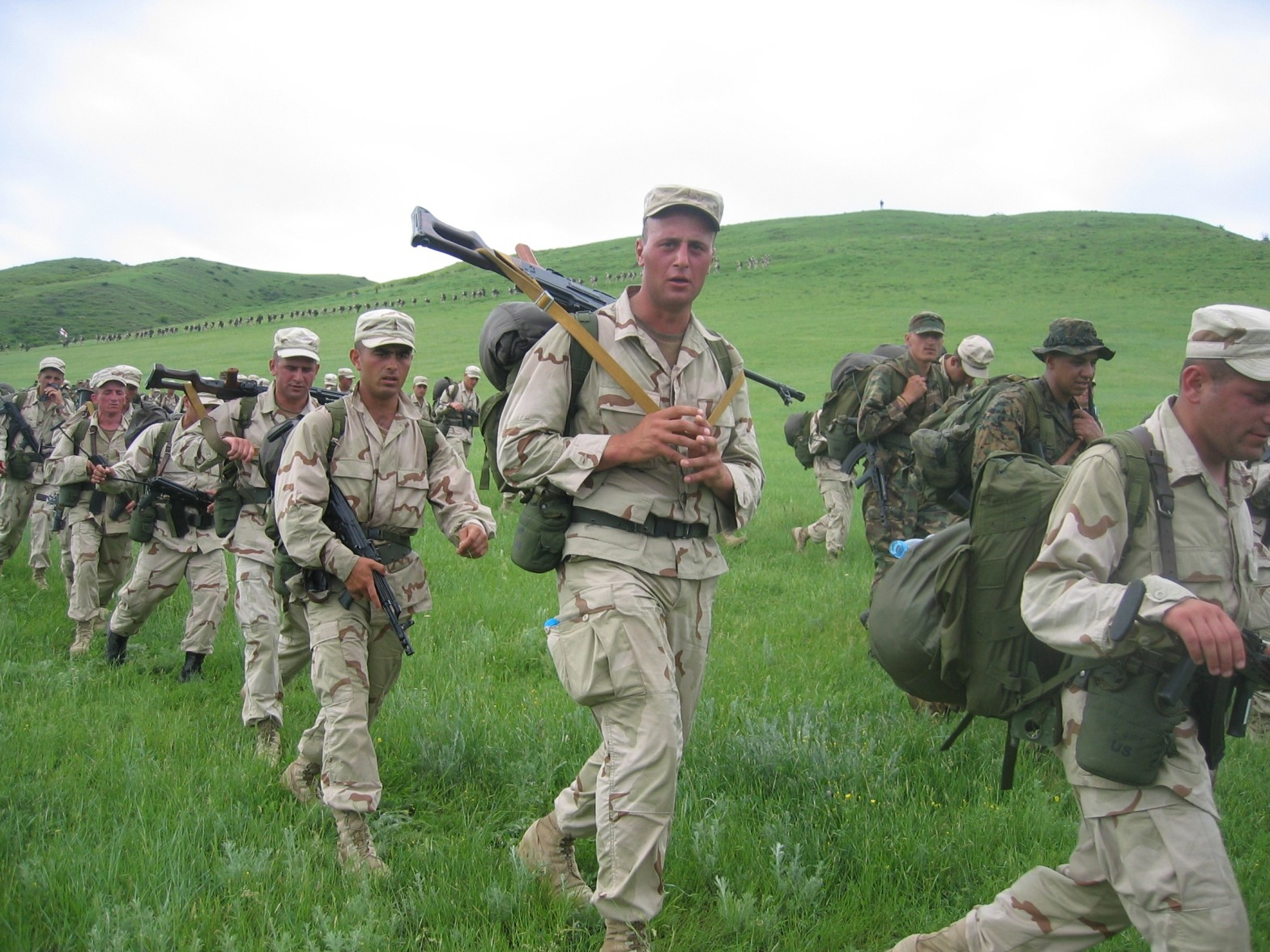
The Georgian Land Forces' 23rd Light Infantry Battalion on joint military exercise with US Marines, 2005

Today, the term "light" denotes units lacking heavy weapons and armor or with a reduced vehicle footprint as in opposition to motorized infantry or mechanized infantry, both of which rely heavily on vehicles for both transport and for combat. Light infantry units lack the greater firepower, operational mobility, and protection of mechanized or armored units, but possess correspondingly greater tactical mobility and can execute missions in severely restrictive terrain and areas where weather makes vehicular mobility difficult.

Light infantry forces typically rely on their ability to operate under restrictive conditions, surprise, violence of action, training, stealth, field craft, and fitness levels of the individual soldiers to compensate for their reduced lethality. Despite the usage of the term "light", forces in a light unit actually normally carry heavier individual loads vis-à-vis other forces, because they must – due to their lack of vehicles – carry everything they require to fight, survive, and win.

Although some units are categorized as Air Assault Infantry, Airborne Infantry, Naval infantry or Marines, they also fall under the overall concept of light infantry. Light infantry forces are typically infantry forces intended for difficult terrains such as:

- amphibious assault – e.g., the U.S. Marines, Royal Marines;
- mountains or arctic conditions – e.g., the United States Army 10th Mountain Division, United States Army 86th Infantry Brigade Combat Team (Mountain), Italian Army Alpini, French Army Chasseurs Alpins; or
- jungle – e.g., the Philippine Army 1st Scout Ranger Regiment and Brazilian Army Jungle Infantry Brigades.

Light infantry has been used for example during the Falklands War in 1982. Both Argentina and the United Kingdom made heavy use of light infantry and its doctrines during the campaign, most notably the Argentine 5th Naval Infantry Battalion (Argentina) and 25th Infantry Regiment (Argentina) and the British Parachute Regiment and Royal Marines of 3 Commando Brigade. Due to the Falkland Islands' rocky and mountainous terrain, the operations on the ground were only made possible with the use of light infantry; the terrain severely limited using mechanized infantry or armor. Additionally, the Falklands are islands with no bridges to mainland, thus deployment of vehicles and heavy weaponry was also limited by the difficulty and danger of sea transport and landing operations. These conditions led to the "Yomp" across the Falklands, in which Royal Marines and Paras yomped (and tabbed) with their equipment across the islands, covering 56 miles (90 km) in three days carrying 80-pound (36 kg) loads after disembarking from ships at San Carlos on East Falkland on 21 May 1982.

== National examples ==
=== Argentina ===
- Mountain Huntsmen, in Spanish: Cazadores de Montaña
- Jungle Huntsmen, in Spanish: Cazadores de Monte

=== Belgium ===
- 12th-13th Battalion of the Line
- 1st Regiment Jagers te Paard, mechanized reconnaissance battalion
- 2nd/4th Regiment Mounted Rifles, mechanized reconnaissance battalion with electronic warfare unit
- Regiment Carabiniers Prins Boudewijn – Grenadiers

=== Brazil ===
There are three light infantry brigades, (4ª Brigada de Infantaria Leve de Montanha, 11ª Brigada de Infantaria Leve and 12ª Brigada de Infantaria Leve Aeromóvel), and an airborne infantry brigade (Brigada de Infantaria Paraquedista). The 12º Light Infantry Brigade and the Airborne Infantry Brigade both belong to the Força de Ação Rápida Estratégica (Quick Strategic Action Force), which is composed of units capable of rapidly engaging in combat anywhere in Brazil.

=== Canada ===
Each of the three regular army regiments (Princess Patricia's Canadian Light Infantry, Royal Canadian Regiment and Royal 22^{e} Régiment) maintains their third battalion as light infantry capable in airborne, mountain, and amphibious operations, with varying degrees of capability. All reserve infantry units are classed as light infantry, all with varying degrees of capability.

=== Denmark ===
- Schleswig Regiment of Foot

=== Finland ===
- Finnish Jäger troops, volunteers from Finland in Germany trained as Jägers
- Guard Jaeger Regiment, a Finnish Army unit
- Jaeger Brigade, a unit of the Finnish Army
- Para Jägers, Special Operations Airborne Infantry in the Finnish Army
- Utti Jaeger Regiment, the Finnish Army training and development centre for special forces and helicopter operations
- Sissi troops can also be considered light infantry

Finnish infantry units are also known as Jäger (Finnish pl. Jääkärit, Swedish pl. Jägarna), a legacy of a Finnish volunteer Jäger battalion formed in Germany during World War I to fight for the liberation of Finland from Russia.

=== France ===
==== Ancien régime ====
The Chasseur designation was given to certain regiments of French light infantry (Chasseurs à pied) or light cavalry (Chasseurs à cheval).

The Chasseurs à pied (light infantry) were originally recruited from hunters or woodsmen. The Chasseurs à Pied, as the marksmen of the French army, were considered an elite. The first unit raised was Jean Chrétien Fischer's Free Hunter Company in 1743. Early units were often a mix of cavalry and infantry. In 1776, all Chasseurs units were re-organized into six battalions, each linked to a cavalry regiment (Chasseurs à cheval). In 1788, the link between infantry battalions and cavalry regiments was broken.

==== Revolution and Napoleon ====
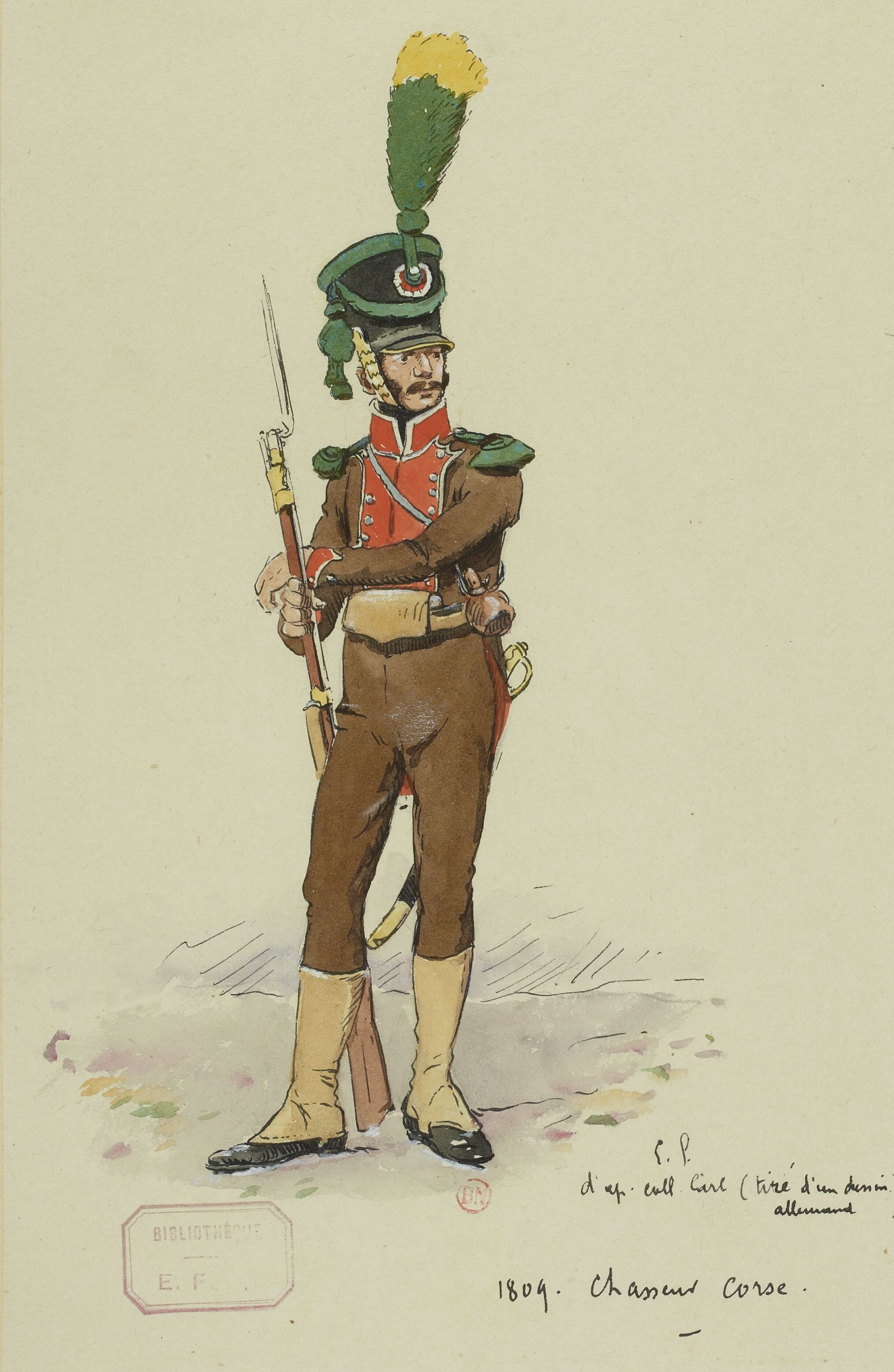
A French Imperial Army chasseur in 1804

In 1793, the Ancien Régime's Chasseur battalions were merged with volunteer battalions in new units called Light Infantry half-brigades (demi-brigades d'infanterie légère). In 1803, the half-brigades were renamed regiments. These units had three battalions of three regular Chasseurs companies, one elite Carabiniers company and one reconnaissance voltigeurs company.

In Napoléon's Imperial Guard, many units used names linked to light infantry:

- Chasseurs à pied: three regiments (1809–1815; 1815–1815; 1815–1815). The regiments were the elite of the light infantry regiments.
- Fusilier-Chasseurs: a single regiment, originally the first Guard Fusilier Regiment (1809–1815)
- Voltigeur: 16 regiments, originally two regiments of Tirailleurs-chasseur and two regiments of Conscrits-chasseurs (1810–1815), then twelve new regiments (1811–1815). These regiments were expected to become Chasseurs à pieds.
- Flanqueurs-Chasseurs: two regiments, from drafted Forest Service members (1811–1815; 1813–1815)

==== 19th century ====
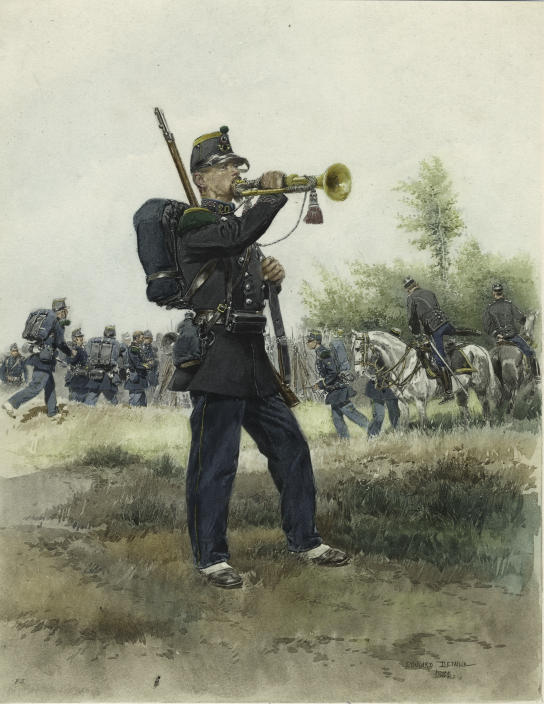
1885 painting of a French chasseurs à pied bugler

The Napoleonic light infantry regiments existed until 1854, but there were very few differences between them and the line infantry regiments, so the 25 remaining light infantry regiments were transformed to line infantry in 1854.

- Chasseurs à pied: The Duke of Orléans, heir to the throne, created in 1838 a new light infantry unit, the Tirailleurs battalion. It soon became, under the name Chasseur à Pied, the main light infantry unit in the French Army. The number of battalions grew up steadily through the century. The current Chasseurs battalions drew their lineage form this unit.
- Chasseurs alpins: Some Chasseurs à pied battalions were converted to specialized mountain units as Bataillons de Chasseurs Alpins in 1888, as an answer to the Italian Alpine (Alpini) regiments stationed along the Alpine frontier.
- Chasseurs Forestiers: The Chasseurs forestiers (Forest Huntsmen) were militarized units of the Forest Service. They were organized in companies. They existed between 1875 and 1924.
- Infanterie Légère d'Afrique (African Light Infantry) were penal battalions forming part of the French forces serving in North Africa. These units were recruited mainly from convicted military criminals from all branches of the French Army, who had finished their sentences in military prisons but still had time to serve before their engagement periods were finished.
- Zouaves: The Zouaves battalions and regiments were colonial troops, formed originally by Algerians, then by European settlers and colonists. The first Zouave battalion was created in 1831 and changed its recruiting to Europeans in 1841. During the Franco-Austrian War of 1859, effective use was made of Zouaves and Chasseurs à pied (see above) in evolving light infantry tactics that went further than merely screening the main battle line. At the Battle of Solferino these newly organized skirmishers operated as independent groups that were able to disrupt their Austrian opponents by sudden flank assaults.
- Tirailleurs: Tirailleurs (Skirmishers) were light infantry who formed a shallow line ahead of the line of battle during the Revolutionary/Napoleonic Wars and subsequently. The name was also used for the locally recruited colonial troops in the French Empire between 1841 and 1962.

==== 20th century ====
- Chasseurs à pied: The Chasseurs à pieds evolved during the mid 20th century into mechanized infantry units (Chasseurs mécanisés) or armored division infantry (Chasseurs portés). After World War Two, all Chasseur units were organized on the mechanized infantry model.
- Chasseurs alpins: The Chasseurs alpins, mountain warfare units of the French Army created in 1888.
- Chasseurs pyrénéens and Chasseurs pyrénéens were the short-lived (1939–1940) mountain warfare units formed in the Pyrénées.
- Chasseurs-Parachutistes: The Chasseurs-parachutistes were airborne infantry units formed in 1943 from Air Force infantry compagnies transferred to the Army.
- Zouaves and Tirailleurs: After the independence of the countries that made up the French Colonial Empire, the Zouaves and the Tirailleurs units, save for one, were disbanded.

==== Modern French Army Light Infantry ====
- 7th Chasseurs Alpins Battalion
- 13th Chasseurs Alpins Battalion
- 16th Chasseur Battalion
- 27e bataillon de chasseurs alpins
- 1st Tirailleur Regiment
- 1st Parachute Chasseur Regiment

Although the traditions of these different branches of the French Army are very different, there is still a tendency to confuse one with the other. For example, when World War I veteran Léon Weil died, the AFP press agency stated that he was a member of the 5th "Regiment de Chasseurs Alpins". It was in fact the 5th Bataillon.

=== India ===
The Indian Army of 1914 included ten regiments with "Light Infantry" in their titles. These were the:

- 2nd Queen Victoria's Own Rajput Light Infantry
- 5th Light Infantry
- 6th Jat Light Infantry
- 63rd Palamcottah Light Infantry
- 83rd Wallajahabad Light Infantry
- 91st Punjabis (Light Infantry)
- 103rd Mahratta Light Infantry
- 105th Mahratta Light Infantry
- 110th Mahratta Light Infantry
- 127th Baluch Light Infantry

Most of these regiments lost their separate identity as a result of extensive amalgamations in 1922. The modern Indian Army retains the Maratha Light Infantry and the Sikh Light Infantry.

Of the 28 infantry regiments of the modern Indian Army, the following ten are designated as "Rifles". They are distinguished by their black rank badges, black buttons on their service and ceremonial uniforms and a beret in a darker shade of green than other regiments. Two paramilitary forces—the Assam Rifles and the Eastern Frontier Rifles—also follow the traditions of a rifle regiment.

- Rajputana Rifles
- Garhwal Rifles
- 1st Gorkha Rifles (The Malaun Regiment)
- 3 Gorkha Rifles
- 4 Gorkha Rifles
- 5 Gorkha Rifles (Frontier Force)
- 8 Gorkha Rifles
- 9 Gorkha Rifles
- 11 Gorkha Rifles
- Jammu and Kashmir Rifles
- Jammu and Kashmir Light Infantry
- Maratha Light Infantry
- Sikh Light Infantry

=== Ireland ===
The Irish famously employed "Cethernacht" or Kern as light infantry. These usually made up the bulk of Gaelic and even later Anglo Norman Irish armies during the Middle Ages to renaissance era's. Traditionally armed with javelins and swords while wearing no armour, in later periods they were equipped with caliver muskets while still using little to no armour. They were notably effective while employed in tandem with heavily armed "Galloglaich" or anglicised Gallowglass. They could provide effective support to heavily armed troops as well as endlessly harassing enemies in difficult terrain. Today, all infantry battalions of the Irish Army are light infantry soldiers.

=== Italy ===
Most of the states of the Italian peninsula had their own units of skirmishers before Italian unification. One of the few that survived it were the Sardinian Bersaglieri, who were formed in 1836. They became some of the most iconic soldiers in Italian Army and were its "quick reaction force". The Alpini are the Italian Army's elite mountain troops, founded in 1875. Although they may not seem a true "light infantry" unit, (they were assigned their own artillery, carried double load of everything, and had a slower marching pace of 45 steps per minute), the Alpini were trained as jagers and skirmishers, introducing the use of skis and climbing training for all of their recruits. Those two corps still exist today, but in recent years the Bersaglieri have become a mechanised infantry unit, working closely with armoured units, and up until the mid-1990s had their own tank and artillery units. Other units that can be classified as light infantry are:

- The Folgore Parachute Brigade, created in 1963, is the only airborne unit in the Italian Army. Apart from one light cavalry regiment, it comprises three airborne infantry and two special force regiments.
- The Friuli Air Assault Brigade was originally an Italian Army mechanised brigade. In 2000 it converted to a fully airmobile role and is part of the "Friuli" Division. It is composed of three light aviation regiments and one infantry regiment—66th Reggimento Fanteria Aeromobile "Trieste"—the only regiment in the Italian Army to be fully airmobile.
- The San Marco Marine Brigade of the Italian Navy comprises three regiments. The First is an amphibious assault unit, the Second carries out force protection, boarding and search and seizure procedures on ships and the Third is a training unit. Given that it has almost only light vehicles (the heaviest being the amphibious Arisgator and AAV7 landing vehicles) and is tasked to operate in harsh terrain (shore lines, lagoons, deserts, mountains, jungles), it is one of the purest "light infantry" units in the Italian Armed Forces.

=== Myanmar ===
The modern Myanmar Army is reported to have a total of 10 units designated as a "Light Infantry Division" and 20 units designated as "Military Operation Command". Two units are mostly similar in term of organisational structure. One of the main differences is that LIDs are mostly numbered in double digits like 11, 22, 33, 44 whereas MOCs are numbered sequelly. Both commands 10 battalions. While not that obvious, one of the main difference in term of organisational structure is that LIDs' 10 battalions are all Light Infantry whereas for MOC, it's 7 Infantry Battalions (Motorised) and 3 Infantry Battalions (Mechanised). Both have an intermediate layer between the Battalions and Division HQ called Tactical Operation Command. A TOC is a unit that commands up to 3 battalions. Essentially, LIDs are made up of 3 TOC and 1 battalion under HQ as reserve whereas MOCs are made up of 2 TOC (Motorised) and 1 TOC (Mechanised) with an IB (Motorised) under HQ as reserve. As for the command structure, LIDs are directly answerable to the Commander in Chief of Army whereas MOCs are subordinate to their respective Regional Military Command. As for unit patches, LIDs have their own division patches where MOCs do not have distinctive patches and wear RMC's patch instead. LIDs in Burmese are called ခြေမြန်တပ်မဌာနချုပ် (တမခ) whereas MOCs are called စစ်ဆင်ရေးကွပ်ကဲမှုဌာနချုပ် (စကခ). Both Light Infantry Divisions and MOCs have an officer ranked Brigadier General as their General Officer Commanding, Colonel as Second in Command and Lieutenant Colonel as Division Chief of Staff (informally Division G/A/Q).

Units designated as "Light Infantry Divisions" are

- No. (11) Light Infantry Division
- No. (22) Light Infantry Division
- No. (33) Light Infantry Division
- No. (44) Light Infantry Division
- No. (55) Light Infantry Division
- No. (66) Light Infantry Division
- No. (77) Light Infantry Division
- No. (88) Light Infantry Division
- No. (99) Light Infantry Division
- No. (101) Light Infantry Division

Military Operation Commands:

Units designated as "Military Operation Commands" are

- No. (1) Military Operation Command
- No. (2) Military Operation Command
- No. (3) Military Operation Command
- No. (4) Military Operation Command
- No. (5) Military Operation Command
- No. (6) Military Operation Command
- No. (7) Military Operation Command
- No. (8) Military Operation Command
- No. (9) Military Operation Command
- No. (10) Military Operation Command

Since No. (11) Light Infantry Division has already been reformed, No. (11) Military Operation Command was not formed

- No. (12) Military Operation Command
- No. (13) Military Operation Command
- No. (14) Military Operation Command
- No. (15) Military Operation Command
- No. (16) Military Operation Command
- No. (17) Military Operation Command
- No. (18) Military Operation Command
- No. (19) Military Operation Command
- No. (20) Military Operation Command
- No. (21) Military Operation Command

=== Netherlands ===
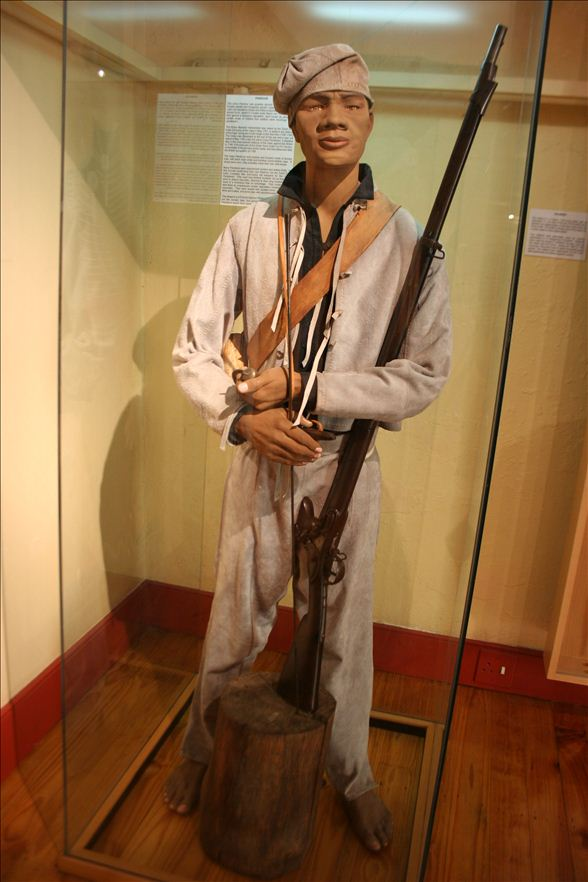
Reproduction of the uniform of a private of the Pandour Corps

- 11th Airmobile Brigade. The 11th Airmobile Brigade (Dutch: 11 Luchtmobiele Brigade) is the rapid light infantry brigade of the Royal Netherlands Army, focused on conducting air assault operations. Troops of the brigade are qualified to wear the maroon beret upon completion of the demanding training course, those qualified as military parachutists wear the appropriate parachutist wings.
- Regiment Limburgse Jagers, line infantry (former 2nd Infantry Regiment). Consists of one motorized infantry battalion
- Pandour Corps, a Khoekhoe light infantry unit that served the Dutch East India Company during the French Revolutionary Wars.

=== Norway ===
- Hærens Jegerkommando, the armed forces competence center for ranger, airborne and counter-terrorist duty in the Norwegian Army
- Jegerkompaniet, the Norwegian Army's northernmost unit
- Marinejegerkommandoen, a maritime special forces unit
- Kystjegerkommandoen, coastal units
- Grensejeger, border rangers at the border between Russia and Norway

=== Poland ===
- Wojska Obrony Terytorialnej, Territorial Defence Force 17 light infantry brigades

=== Portugal ===
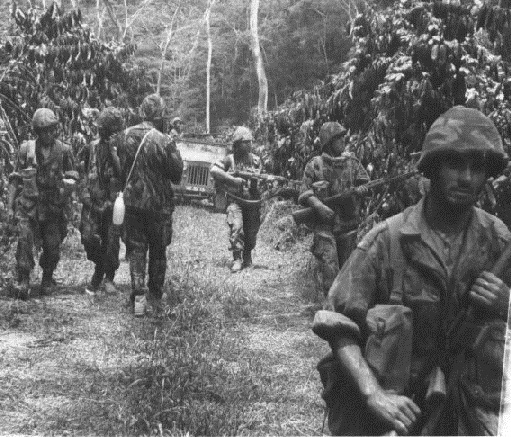
Portuguese caçadores especiais in the jungle of Angola, during a counter insurgency operation in the early 1960s

Portuguese light infantry soldiers were known as caçadores (literally "huntsmen"). Initially organized as a light company in each of the line infantry regiments, the caçadores were later organized as independent battalions. They constituted the elite light infantry of the Portuguese Army during the Peninsular War, being considered by the Duke of Wellington as the "fighting cocks of his army". They wore distinctive brown uniforms as an early form of camouflage.

The caçadores units were disbanded by the Army reorganization of 1911, but were recreated in 1926 as high readiness units, responsible for defending the border and other strategic points of the Country until the line units could be mobilized. In the 1950s, the designation caçadores started to be also given to the expeditionary provisional light infantry battalions and independent companies responsible for reinforcing the overseas territories garrisons. These units constituted the bulk of the Portuguese forces engaged in the several theatres of the Portuguese Overseas War, from 1961 to 1975. Colonial troops with this title also existed, being recruited among both Portuguese European settlers and from indigenous populations. In the 1950s, the Portuguese Air Force formed a unit of paratroopers called caçadores paraquedistas ("parachutist hunters"). Additional battalions of caçadores paraquedistas were later created in Angola, Mozambique and Portuguese Guinea. At the beginning of the 1960s, Portuguese Army raised special forces companies of that were named caçadores especiais (special huntsmen). The caçadores especiais wore a brown beret in the colour of the uniforms of the caçadores of the Peninsular War. These units were later abolished and the brown beret started to be used by most of the units of the Portuguese Army.

In 1975, the designation "caçadores" was discontinued in the Portuguese Armed Forces. All former units of caçadores were redesigned as "infantry". Currently, every infantry soldier of the Portuguese Army is known as atirador. Today, the Portuguese Army uses the designation "light infantry" as a generic collective classification of the Paratroopers, Commandos and Special Operations troops, while the remaining infantry is classified as "motorized/mechanized infantry".

=== Rhodesia ===
The Rhodesian Light Infantry was a regular regiment of the Rhodesian Army, unique in having the traditions of light infantry while serving as a modern Commando regiment.

=== Romania ===
- Vânători de Munte, or "Mountain Huntsmen" are the elite mountain units of the Romanian Army since their establishment in 1916
- Vânători, or "Huntsmen", were the elite Romanian light infantry units until their disbanding in 1947

=== Russia ===
The Imperial Russian Army, which was heavily influenced by the Prussian and Austrian military systems, included fifty Jäger or yegerskii [егерский] regiments in its organisation by 1812, including the Egersky Guards Regiment. They were mostly united with line infantry regiments in 1833, when almost all Russian infantry began to receive the same training; including skirmishing. At the same time strelkovyi [стрелковый] battalions were introduced. These undertook light infantry functions when the skirmishing skills of line infantry were insufficient.

=== Spain ===
See also: Almogavars

Historically the Spanish infantry included several battalions of light infantry that were designated as Cazadores. These units were incorporated into the ordinary infantry following army reorganization in the early 1930s. Until 2006 the modern Spanish Army maintained a Brigada de Cazadores de Montaña "Aragón I" (Mountain Huntsmen Brigade "Aragón I")

=== Sweden ===
- Jägare, elite units in the Swedish Armed Forces
- Fallskärmsjägarna, the Parachute Rangers
- Swedish Parachute Ranger School
- Ö-Nerike skvadron, Intelligence squadron
- Vadsbo skvadron, Airborne squadron
- Army Ranger Battalion, Arctic warfare rifles
- Kustjägarna, Coastal Rangers
- Livbataljon, Life Guards Battalion
- Dalregementet, Valley regiment
- Jämtlands fältjägarkår, Jamtland Field ranger corps

=== Somalia ===
- Danab, which translates to "Lightning" are the elite commandos units of the Somali Armed Forces.

=== United Kingdom ===
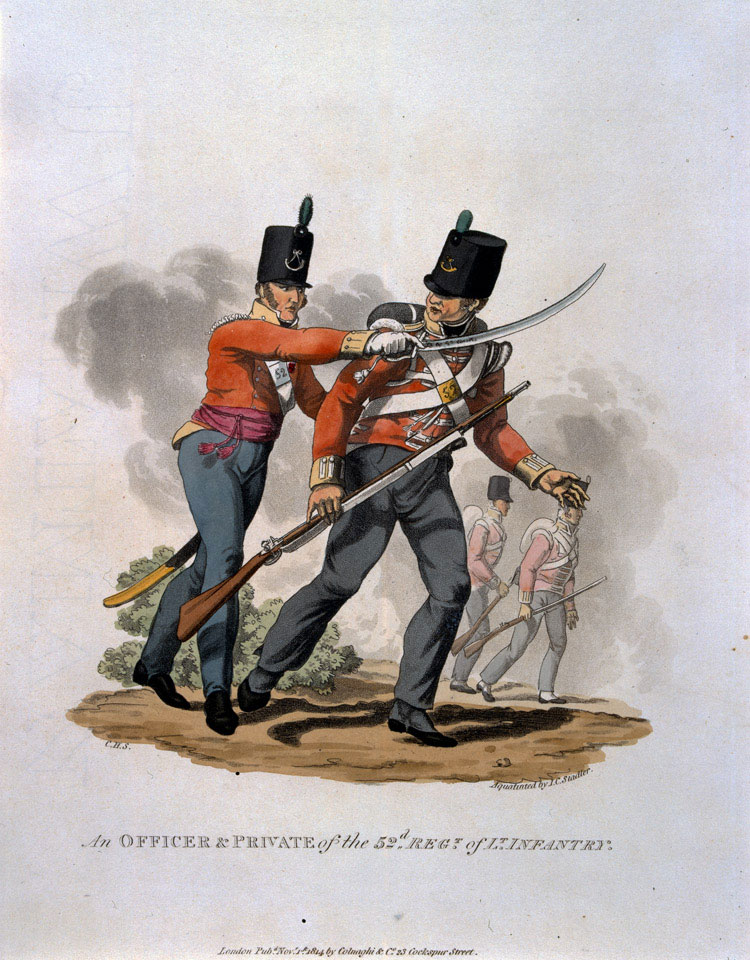
1812 engraving of an officer and private of the 52nd Foot

The British Army first experimented with light infantry in the French and Indian War, to counter the tactics used by the French-allied Native Americans. Along with secondment of regular infantry, several specialised units were raised (including Rogers' Rangers and the 80th Regiment of Light-Armed Foot), though most if not all had been disbanded by the middle of the 1760s. From 1770, all regular battalions were required to designate one of their ten companies a "Light Company", though their training in skirmishing was sometimes poor and inconsistent.

Initial regimental reports indicate that in peacetime men transferred to the new light companies were selected from shorter recruits - about 5 ft 7 in. on average in contrast to 5 ft 11 for grenadiers and 5 ft 8 for members of the "hatman" companies. With the outbreak of the American Revolutionary War this parade ground concept was discontinued and agility, initiative and marksmanship became the qualities looked for when picking "chosen men" for the light companies.

Dedicated rifle and light infantry regiments began to be formed or converted in the Napoleonic Wars, to counter the French Chasseurs. A new battalion of the 60th Royal Americans (later the King's Royal Rifle Corps) was raised in 1797, and an "Experimental Corps of Riflemen" (later the 95th Rifles and then the Rifle Brigade) in 1800. Both were equipped with green jackets and Baker rifles. Some extant regiments began to be designated "Light Infantry" at this point, receiving skirmishing training but generally still equipped with red coats and muskets. In the Peninsular War, a Light Brigade and later a Light Division were formed, at some points incorporating Portuguese Caçadores. By the Crimean War, rifles had become universal and tactics had substantially changed. This meant that the distinctions between light and line infantry were effectively limited to details such as name, a rapid march of 140 steps per minute, buglers instead of drummers and fifers, a parade drill which involved carrying rifles parallel to the ground ("at the trail") and dark green cloth helmets instead of dark blue. Scarlet tunics were retained for ceremonial wear by light infantry regiments until 1914, providing a ready distinction from green clad riflemen. Light infantry badges always incorporated bugle horns as a central feature.

In the Second World War, the use of light infantry was revived in what became the British Commandos and the Parachute Regiment. Because of the nature of their role and deployment, they were more lightly equipped than most infantry battalions. The Parachute Regiment has survived to this day, while the Royal Marine Commandos are directly descended from those units formed in the Second World War.

Most of the old light infantry and rifle regiments were administratively grouped in a new Light Division in 1968. The British Army ordered regimental amalgamations in 1957, 1966, 1990 and 2003. The Rifles (the largest infantry regiment in the British Army) was formed in 2007 from the amalgamation of the regiments of the Light Division. The Rifles maintain the traditional quick parade march of all British light infantry, the Rifle Brigade's "rifle green" No 1 dress with blackened buttons and black leather belts, and many other traditions and "golden threads" of its parent regiments. The only rifle regiment not to become part of the Rifles was the Royal Gurkha Rifles. Following a series of amalgamations and one disbandment, none of the historic Light Infantry regiments now survive as separate entities within the modern British Army.

Today, "Light role infantry" is a designation that can be applied to an infantry battalion of any regiment. Light role infantry are not (by default) equipped with armoured vehicles (unlike Armoured Infantry or Mechanised Infantry).

=== United States ===
==== Colonial and Revolutionary War ====
In 1780, General George Washington published an order of battle which included a corps of light infantry, under the command of General Lafayette. The light infantry participated in several major battles of the southern states in 1781, including the Battle of Yorktown. The entire Continental Army was dismissed after the war, with all regiments disbanded in 1784.

==== 19th Century ====
In 1808, the United States Army created its first Regiment of Riflemen. During the War of 1812 three more Rifle Regiments were raised but disbanded after the war. The Rifle Regiment was disbanded in 1821.

In the Mexican–American War Colonel Jefferson Davis created and led the Mississippi Rifles.

Riflemen were listed as separate to infantry up to the American Civil War.

During the Civil War, Sharpshooter regiments were raised in the North with several companies being raised by individual states for their own regiments.

==== 20th Century ====
In the early years of World War 2 the US military saw the need for light forces. They designated the 82nd Division as the 82nd Airborne Division and reactivated the 101st division as the 101st Airborne Division in 1942. In 1943, the United States formed the 10th Light Division (Alpine), re-designated as the 10th Mountain Division in 1944.

In the 1980s, the United States Army increased light forces to address contingencies and increased threats requiring a more deployable force able to operate in restrictive environments for limited periods. At its height, this included the 6th Infantry Division (light), 7th Infantry Division (light), 10th Mountain Division (light infantry), 25th Infantry Division, and the 75th Ranger Regiment. Operation Just Cause is often cited as proof of concept. Almost 30,000 U.S. Forces, mostly light, deployed to Panama within a 48-hour period to execute combat operations. On 30 September 1985, the 29th Infantry Division (Maryland and Virginia Army National Guard) was reactivated at Fort Belvoir, Virginia as the only light Infantry Division in the US Army's reserve components.

In 1983, General John A. Wickham Jr., Chief of Staff of the United States Army, announced the creation of five light infantry divisions to increase the U.S. Army's ability to deploy quickly. These included the 7th Infantry Division, 25th Infantry Division, 6th Infantry Division, 10th Mountain Division, as well as the 29th Infantry Division of the Army National Guard.

==== Modern US Military Light Infantry ====
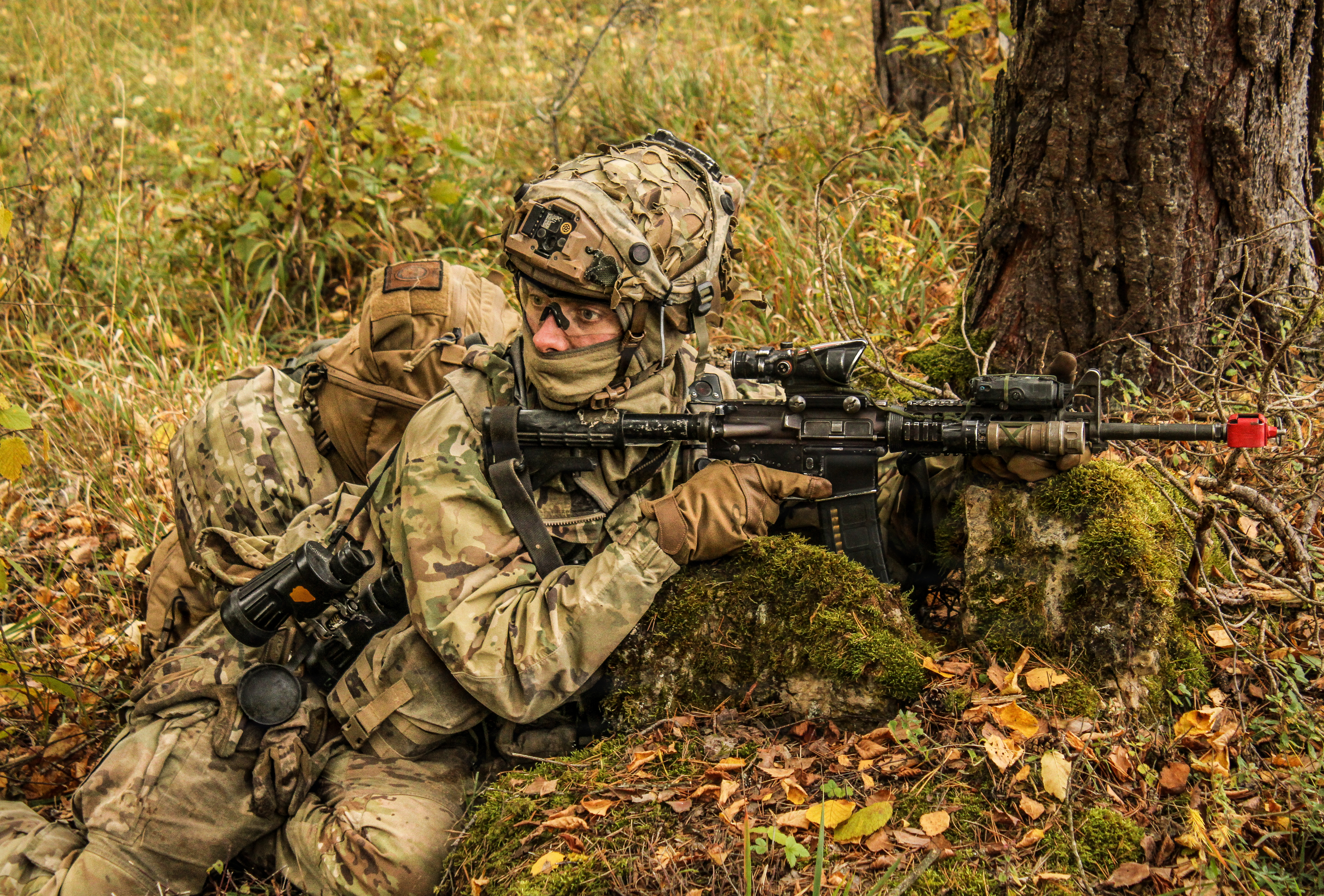
Modern light infantryman, 2nd Brigade, 101st Airborne, training in Germany, October 2025

- 82nd Airborne Division
- 101st Airborne Division
- 10th Mountain Division
- 25th Infantry Division
- 11th Airborne Division

In 2022, the US Army reactivated the 11th Airborne Division by reflagging two infantry brigades from the 25th Infantry Division. Its mission is to conduct infantry operations in the Arctic.

== See also ==
- Heavy cavalry
- Heavy infantry
- Light cavalry
- Line infantry
- Roman infantry tactics, strategy and battle formations

Similar types of unit

- Long-range reconnaissance patrol
- Marksman
- Rifleman
- Sharpshooter
- Skirmisher
