= Simon Hendrik Frijkenius =

Senior official of the Dutch East India Company (1747-1797)

Commissioner-General of the Dutch Cape Colony with Sebastiaan Cornelis Nederburgh
- In office 3 July 1792 – 2 September 1793
- Preceded by: Johan Isaac Rhenius (acting)
- Succeeded by: Abraham Josias Sluysken

Personal details
- Born: c. 1747 Utrecht, Netherlands
- Died: 6 June 1797 Batavia, Dutch East Indies
- Spouse: Anna Elizabeth Hooft

Simon Hendrik Frijkenius (c. 1747 – 6 June 1797) was a sailor, naval officer and Commissioner-General of the VOC.

== Career ==
Frijkenius received naval training and in 1776 was made a lieutenant at the Admiralty College in Amsterdam. A year later he became a naval captain first in the admiralty of West Friesland and later a lieutenant-colonel and naval captain in the service of the Dutch Republic.

Frijkenius was in 1791 appointed Commissioner-General in charge of the possessions of the VOC, together with Sebastiaan Cornelis Nederburgh and two others. Frijkenius and Nederburgh arrived at the Cape on 18 June 1792 where they remained for a year-and-a-half. The two commissioners always acted together, with Nederburgh apparently taking the lead most of the time. At the Cape they did away with certain governmental posts, combated smuggling and imposed new taxes, in an attempt to reduce expenditure and increase income. The increasing of taxation aroused a great deal of dissatisfaction, and the measure of free trade they introduced did not have the desired effect owing to the scarcity of shipping. Other important changes were the establishment of Colony's first bank, the introduction of whale and other fishing as a private as distinct from a government enterprise, and improvements were also made in the feeding of cattle.

On 1 September 1793, they handed over the administration to Abraham Josias Sluysken and the next day they left for Batavia, where they formed an association of four with Governor-General Willem Arnold Alting and the newly appointed Director-General, Johannes Siberg. Frijkenius was also appointed commandant of the country and of the VOC's maritime power in the Dutch East Indies.

Frijkenius regularly disagree with the actions of Alting and Nederburgh and was often overruled in the committee. He eventually asked for his discharge in December 1795.

== Personal ==
Frijkenius was the son of Lambertus Bernhardus Frijkenius, mayor of Wijk bij Duurstede, and his wife, Anna Catharina Rademaker. He was born in Utrecht and baptized there on 28 March 1747. On 19 November 1780 he married Anna Elizabeth Hooft, and they had a son and a daughter.

== See also ==
- 1790s in South Africa
