= Sebastiaan Cornelis Nederburgh =

Senior official of the Dutch East India Company (1762-1811)

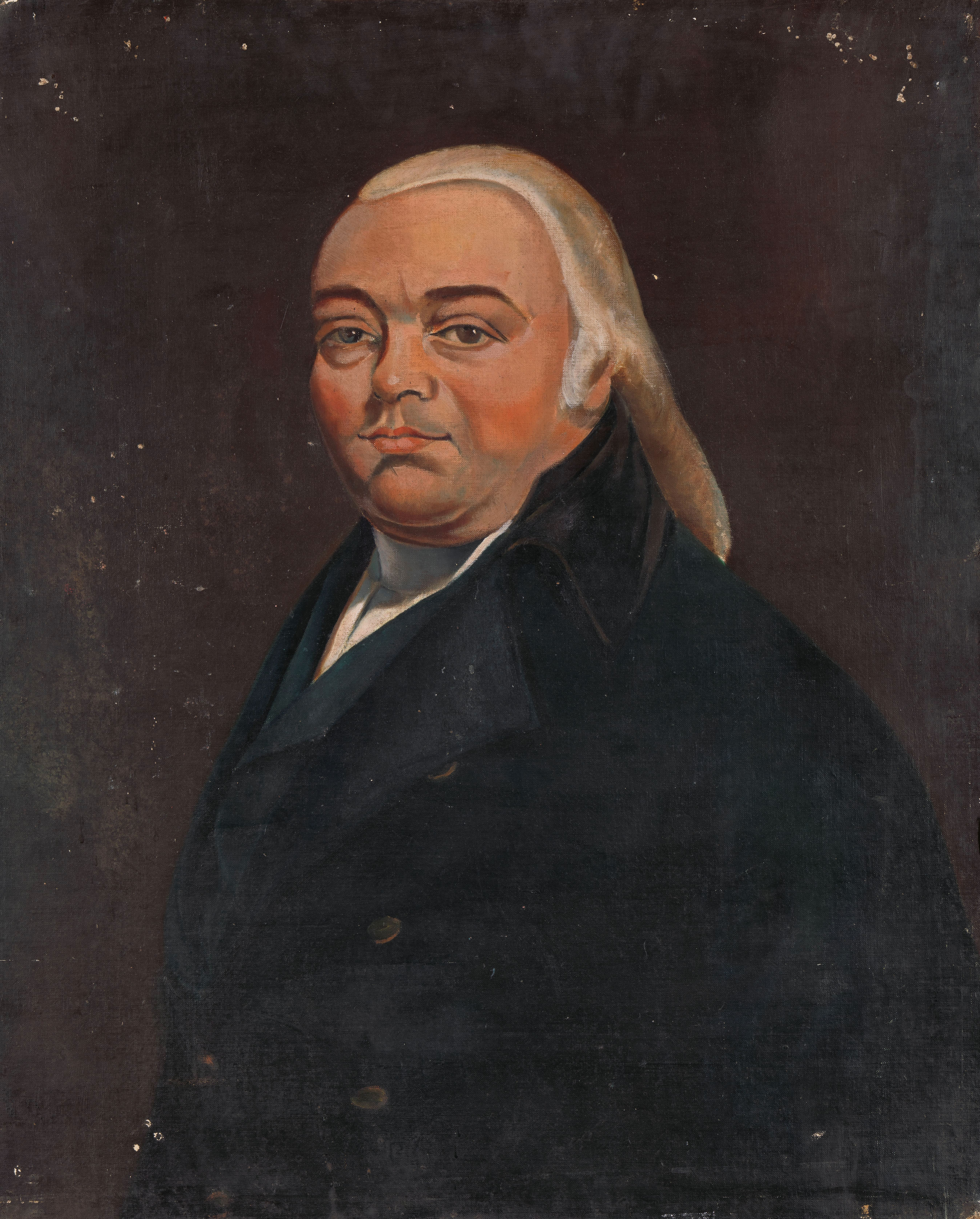

Commissioner-General of the Dutch Cape Colony with Simon Hendrik Frijkenius
- In office 3 July 1792 – 2 September 1793
- Preceded by: Johan Isaac Rhenius (acting)
- Succeeded by: Abraham Josias Sluysken

Personal details
- Born: 7 March 1762 The Hague, Netherlands
- Died: 3 August 1811 (aged 49) 's-Gravenzande, Netherlands
- Spouse: Elizabeth Geertruy Schelten

Sebastiaan Cornelis Nederburgh (7 March 1762 – 3 August 1811) was a Dutch statesman, first advocate and Commissioner General of the Dutch East India Company.

== Early life and career ==
Nederburgh was the son of Advocate Herman Nederburgh, from The Hague and his wife Dina Adriana Spruyt. He obtained a law degree at Leiden University in 1782 and was appointed to various government posts. In 1785 he was appointed advocate of both the Council of State and the States General, being a very senior post for a young man of not even twenty-five. In 1787 he became the first advocate of the Dutch East India Company. Nederburgh married Elizabeth Geertruy Schelten on 9 October 1787.

== The Cape Colony ==
As a result of the Fourth Anglo-Dutch War, the VOC began to experience serious financial problems. Nederburgh was commissioned to compile a report with the theme of how to save the VOC from collapse. His report led to his appointment with Simon Hendrik Frijkenius as Commissioners General in charge of the Company's possessions, with instructions to rectify matters abroad.

Nederburgh and Frykenius arrived at the Cape on 18 June 1792 when they landed at Simon's Bay (present day Simon's Town). There the party was unloaded, and they had to continue on foot over land and reached Cape Town on 23 June 1792.

From 3 July 1792, Nederburgh and Frijkenius, in their position as Commissioner-General, acted together as governors of the Cape Colony. They did away with certain governmental posts, combated smuggling and imposed new taxes, in an attempt to reduce expenditure and increase income. They granted the free burghers leave to export their products but, owing to lack of cargo space, this was of little benefit to the colonists. On 29 July 1793 Nederburgh wrote a letter to the Netherlands, informing the government that the mood at the Cape had been calmed. On 1 September 1793, he and Frijkenius handed over the administration to Abraham Josias Sluysken, former Director of the VOC in Suratte, who as a pensioner on his way to the Netherlands, had stopped in the Cape Colony. This was done because they did not form a high opinion of the acting governor, Johan Isaac Rhenius, and were of the opinion that he was not a suitable candidate.

== Dutch East Indies ==
On 24 September 1793 Nederburgh and Frijkenius departed on their journey to Batavia in the Dutch East Indies, where they arrived on 13 November 1793.

In the Dutch East Indies, Nederburgh was confronted with numerous problems. One of the first challenges was the appointment of a new Director-General. The previous Director-General, H. van Stockum had already died in 1791. In spite of Frykenius's protests, Governor General Willem Arnold Alting, in collaboration with Nederburgh, appointed his own son in-law, Johannes Siberg, as Van Stockum's successor. Nederburgh usually got on well with Alting and Siberg, but clashes were unavoidable, particularly over the appointment and dismissal of officials and attempts to check corruption. As a result of these issues and during December 1795, Nederburgh requested the Lords XVII (Heren XVII) to be discharged. He learned only on 28 September 1799 that his request had been granted, whereupon he left Batavia on 12 October 1799.

== Later career ==
On the way he stayed over at the Cape, which by that time was under British control. When he resumed his journey, he was taken prisoner by a British frigate and transported to England before being released on 16 July 1800. Upon his return to the Netherlands, he endured much criticism over his handling of matters in the Dutch East Indies. In 1803, he received an honourable discharge and the following year, he was appointed to the Asiatic Council. In 1806 he was made head of the first division for East Indian affairs and in 1809 he was appointed Director-General of the Public Treasury. Nederburgh died in at his home in 's-Gravenzande, the Netherlands on 3 August 1811.

== See also ==
- 1790s in South Africa
