= Strand, Cape Town =

In Cape Town, Strand may refer to:

- Strand Street (Cape Town), a street in central Cape Town.
- Strand, Western Cape, a town southeast of Cape Town.
