= Strand Street =

One of the main streets in Cape Town CBD

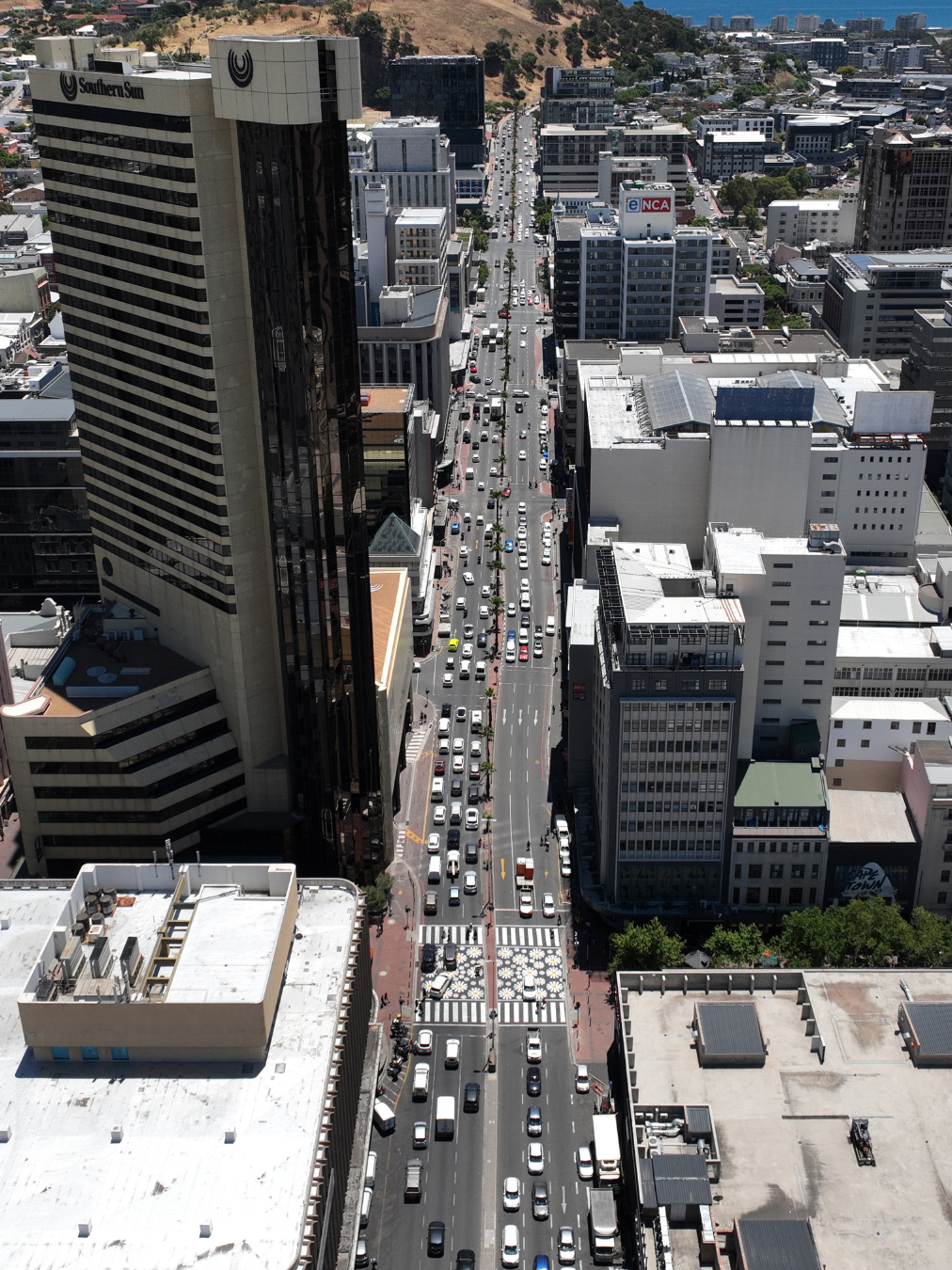
- Arial view northwards down the length of the Strand Street, with newly-installed African daisy-styled pedestrian artwork crossing in the foreground
- Interactive map of Strand Street
- Location: Cape Town, South Africa
- Coordinates: 33°55′17″S 18°25′27″E

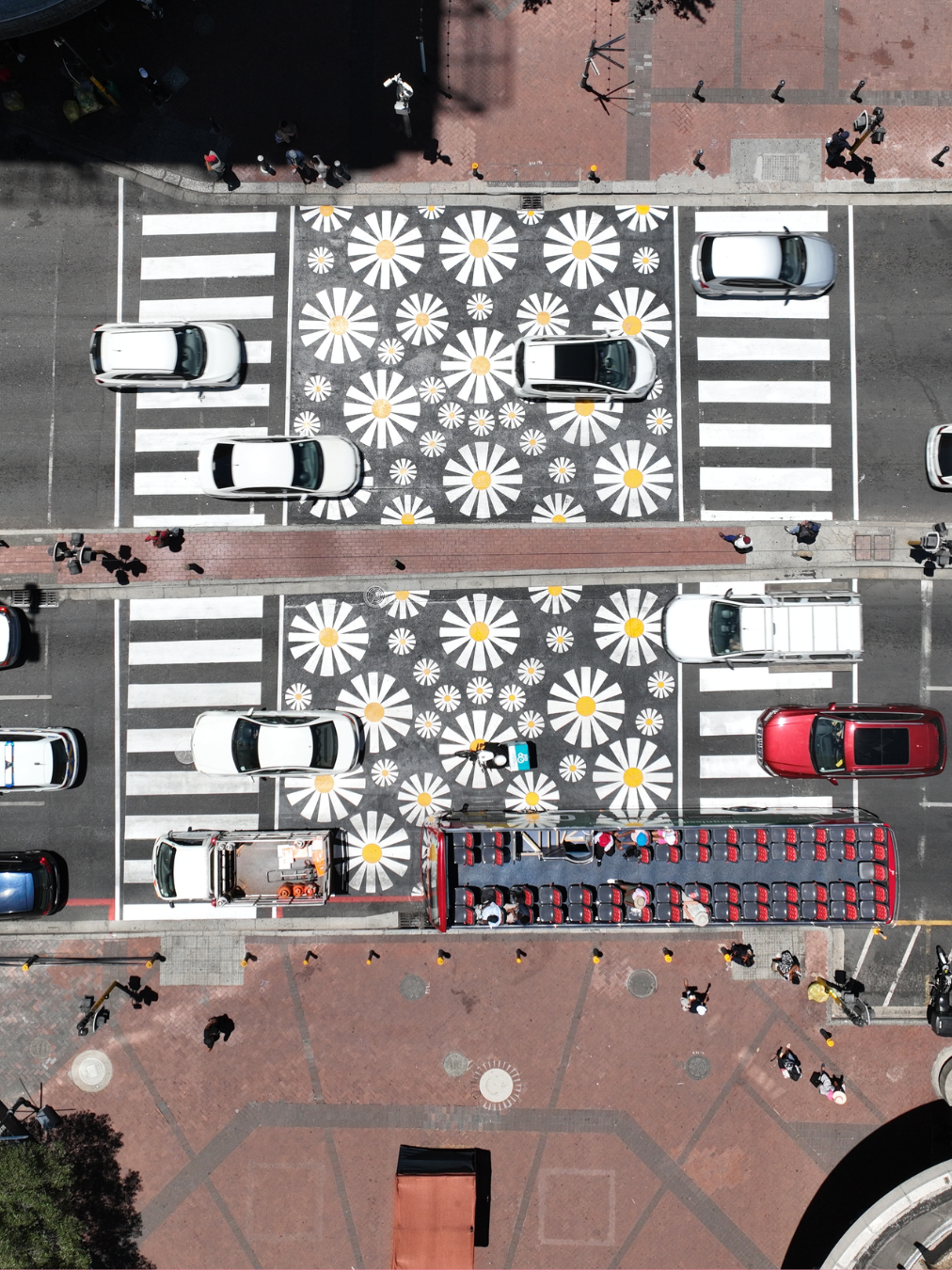
Strand Street's African daisy-styled pedestrian artwork crossing, situated at the St George's Mall intersection. Designed by Heather Moore, it was installed in late 2025

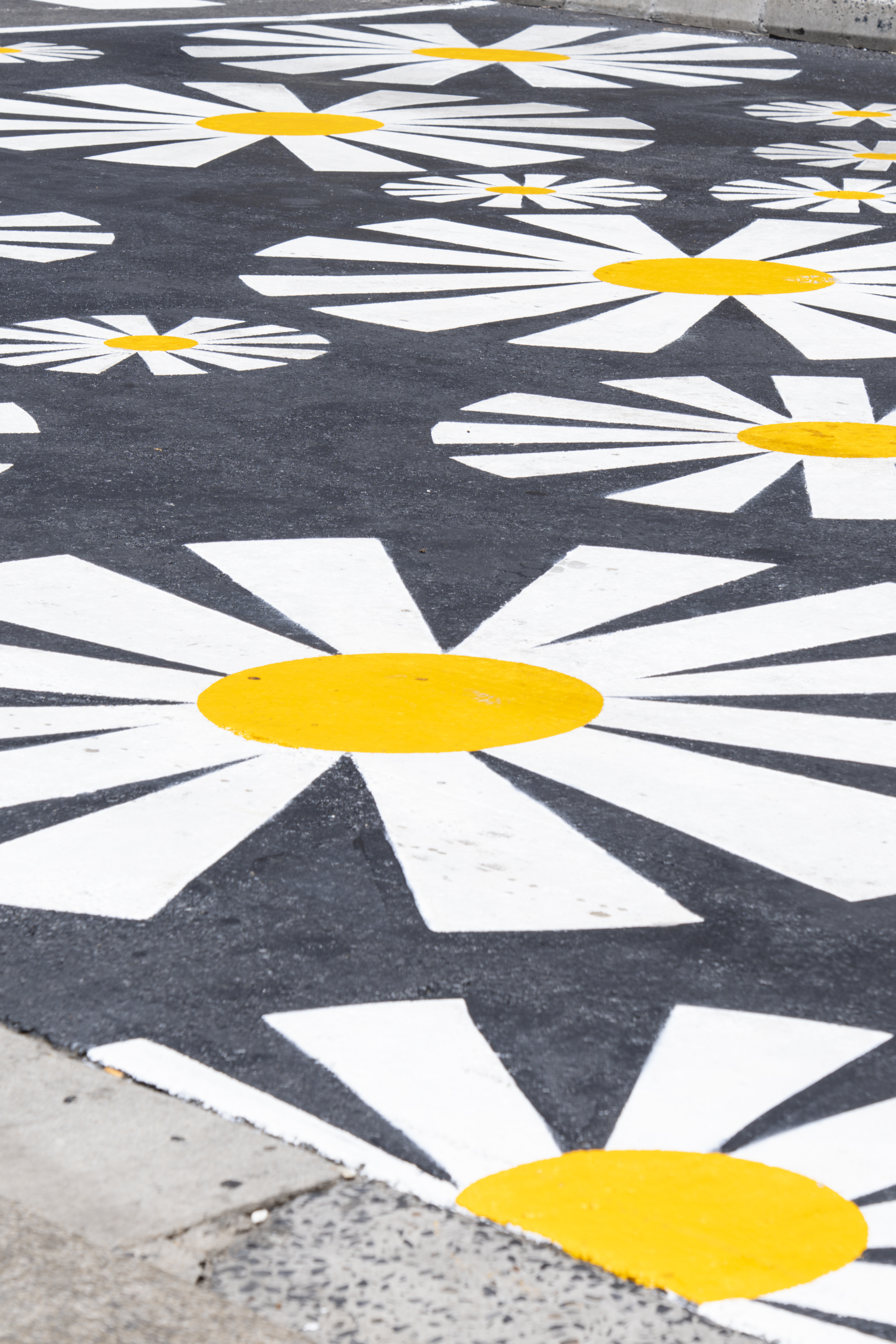
Artwork on a major pedestrian crossing in Strand Street

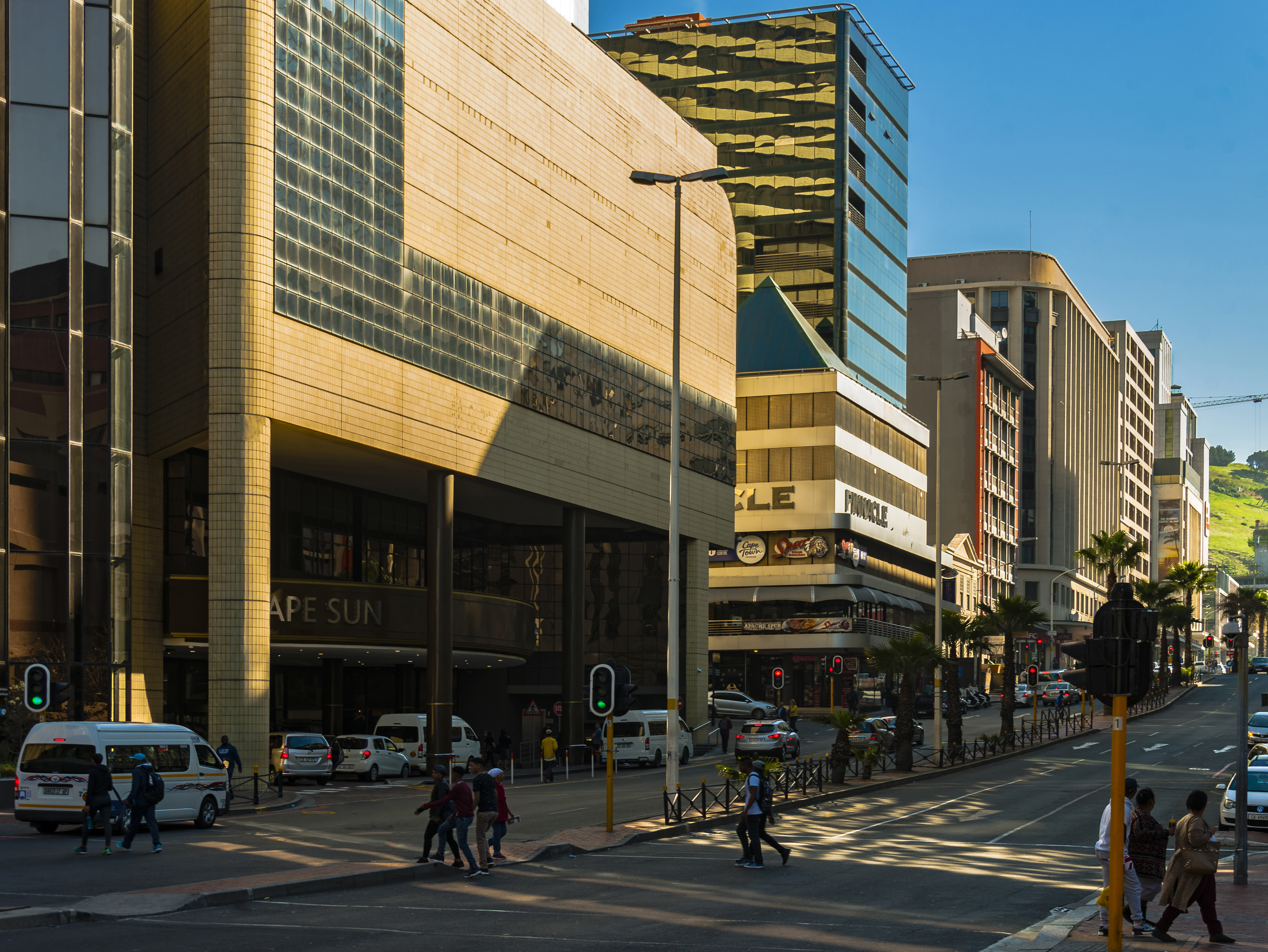
View southwards down Strand Street, from the St. George's Mall intersection

The dotted blue line in this map indicates the original Cape Town CBD shoreline. Strand Street is visible below and to the left of it

Strand Street is a major road in Cape Town CBD, the economic centre of Cape Town, South Africa. It crosses the CBD north to south, just behind the Foreshore area, running from the southern part of Green Point, to the start of the northeastern part of District Six.

== Location ==
Strand Street runs northwest-southeast through the middle of the suburb, from Green Point to Woodstock. passing the Golden Acre shopping centre, the Cape Town railway station, the Lutheran Church in Strand Street, the Koopmans-de Wet House, and the Castle of Good Hope.

Originally, in the vicinity of the Castle, Strand Street ran along the Table Bay shore - "strand" being the Dutch and Afrikaans word for "beach" - but land reclamation to create the Foreshore and the modern Port of Cape Town has moved the shoreline about a kilometre to the northeast.

East of the city centre, Strand Street passes under the N2 freeway, to which it is connected by ramps. It continues as New Market Street and then Albert Street, eventually becoming Voortrekker Road, the original road route from Cape Town to Bellville and the interior. West of the centre it becomes High Level Road to Sea Point.

== Features ==
At its widest (to the south), Strand Street has eight passenger vehicle lanes - four in each direction - plus wide pavements on both sides of the road, and a wide, bricked median dividing it.

Unlike numerous other large roads in the Cape Town CBD, Strand Street does not feature bicycle lanes, however it crosses streets that do.

Strand Street also does not have any dedicated lanes for the MyCiTi BRT system. It is close to Adderley Street and Hertzog Boulevard, which do have dedicated bus lanes, and is also near the Cape Town Civic Centre MyCiTi station - one of the city's main bus hubs - and Cape Town Station, the city's train hub.

The street has one of Cape Town CBD's busiest pedestrian crossings, situated at the St George's Mall intersection. A new African daisy-themed crosswalk, the culmination of six months of work, was unveiled in this spot in late 2025. Designer Heather Moore had to work within the constraints of legal-road-paint legislation and said she chose daisies because they're, "happy, everyday flowers".

The project, which received a positive response from road users, was driven by nonprofit Mission for Inner City Cape Town, which works to bring private money to public spaces, improving safety and comfort for residents.

== Notable addresses ==
- Cape Town Station (the largest in the city for its Metrorail train system) and the surrounding precinct, which has been redeveloped in recent years
- Golden Acre, a large shopping centre that was in the process of being turned into a mixed-use development as of 2025
- One on Bree, on the corner of Strand and Bree streets, which entered the tender phase in 2025, and is set to become Cape Town's second-tallest building
- Strand Street Quarry, bordering the suburbs of Bo-Kaap and De Waterkant, is the largest of three quarries in the Bo-Kaap, the oldest quarry in South Africa, and the source of stone quarried for use in the construction of various historic buildings in the area
- Origin Coffee's roastery
- The Capital Mirage hotel and apartments
- Private tertiary education institution Vega School's Cape Town campus
- 117 on Strand, a modern, mid-rise office tower
- The Sun Square Cape Town City Bowl and StayEasy Cape Town City Bowl hotels (in the same building)
- The Southern Sun Cape Sun hotel
- The Castle Street Golden Arrow Bus Station

== See also ==
- Koopmans-de Wet House
- Grand Parade
- Lutheran Church in Strand Street
