= Anton Anreith =

German sculptor

- Born: 11 June 1754; Riegel near Freiburg im Breisgau, Baden, Germany
- Died: 4 March 1822 (aged 67); Cape of Good Hope
- Occupations: Sculptor, Woodcarver

Anton Anreith (/ˈæntɒn ˈænraɪt/; June 11, 1754 – March 4, 1822) was a sculptor and woodcarver from Riegel near Freiburg in Breisgau, Baden, Germany. He is known for numerous sculptural embellishments that adorn buildings in the Cape region of South Africa, thought to represent the crowning achievement of the Cape Baroque style.

== Background and early life ==
Although his father's occupation is unknown, an elder brother, Georg, was a builder and architect who settled in Hungary. During the baroque era, architecture and sculpture were closely allied and it is likely that Anreith received his training from an artist's studio, such as that of Christian Wenzinger, a sculptor and architect. He is also thought to have studied under Joseph Amann and later Joseph Hörr. During the time of his apprenticeship in the 1770s, rococo architects Johann Michael Fischer and Johann Balthasar Neumann were well known, as were stucco decorators like the Feuchtmayer family of the Wessobrunner School.

Anreith arrived at the Cape of Good Hope as a soldier in the service of the Dutch East-India Company in 1777 on the vessel Woestduijn.

== Career and works ==
=== Church pulpits ===
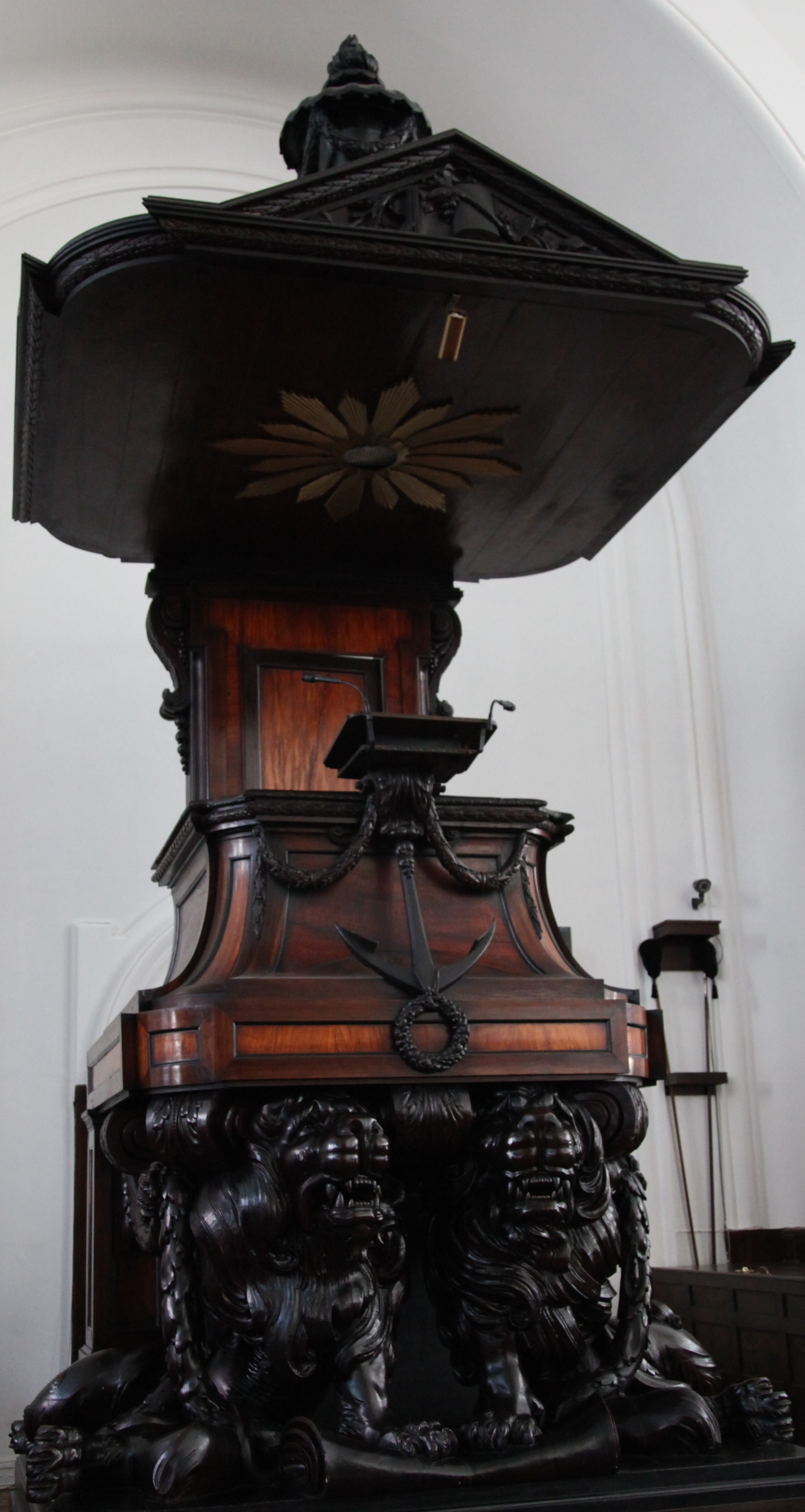
The Groote Kerk pulpit

Although he was a trained sculptor, he was initially employed as a carpenter. His status changed when, in the 1780s, a wealthy Lutheran named Martin Melck commissioned him to carve a pulpit for the Lutheran Church in Strand Street, Cape Town.

His earliest work for the Lutheran Church in Strand Street was the King David relief on the organ loft, done in 1783, but the most important work was the pulpit completed in 1785 to 1786. The memorial plaque, dedicated to Martin Melck is also of his making, as are the windows and the doors. By 1791 Anreith had completed work on the interior of the building and proceeded to give the church a new facade (1791–1792). Unfortunately, this was rebuilt in 1820, along with Anreith's turret, now known only from drawings by Lady Anne Barnard and John Barrow. He also had considerable influence over the facade and carved teak portal of the neighbouring parsonage, known as the Martin Melck House.

In 1786, he was appointed master-sculptor to the Dutch East India Company. Not to be outdone by the Lutherans, in 1788 the Dutch Reformed Church commissioned Anreith to create a pulpit. He was assisted by Jan Jacob Graaff (1754–1804), chief carpenter at the Company, who arrived in Cape Town in 1775. Though the pulpit was designed by Anreith, the higher ranking Graaff received 1100 rix dollars, as opposed to his 900. Graaff completed the pulpit in 18 months and it was inaugurated at the Groote Kerk in Adderley Street on 29 November 1789.

=== Groot Constantia ===
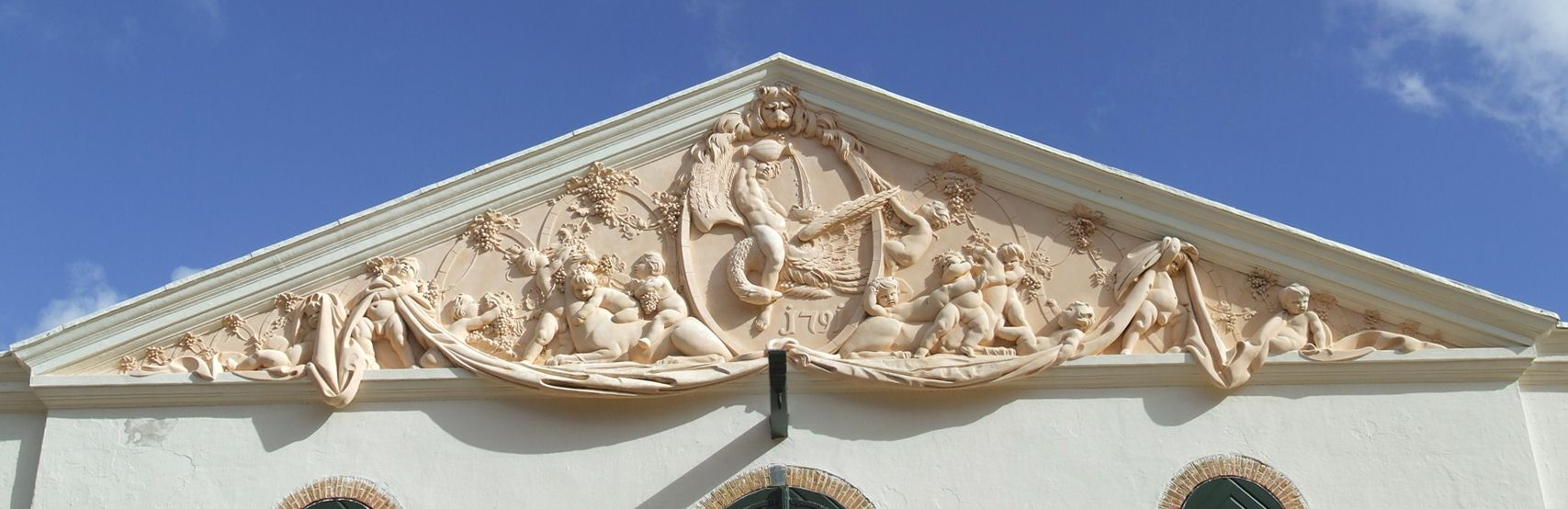
Close up of the pediment gable "The Rape of Ganymede" by sculptor Anton Anreith.

Anreith left the service of the Company and worked independently from 1791, often closely with the architect Louis Michel Thibault. That year he did his first project with the architect, the wine-cellar at Groot Constantia, commissioned by Hendrik Cloete, for which he designed an elaborate baroque pediment, The Rape of Ganymede, a depiction of the myth of the youth, abducted by Zeus in the form of an eagle, who became cup-bearer to the Greek Gods. He arranged a multitude of putti figures in front of a row of wine vats, joined to one another with vines and bunches of grapes. The childlike Ganymede is central, seated on an eagle, pouring wine from a jar.

At the Groot Constantia homestead, a niched gable statue of Abundantia stands holding a cornucopia. This work was likely done around 1800, although Dora Fairbridge claims Cloete family tradition holds it not to be by Anreith. A bath with Triton, also at Constantia, is more likely to be by his hand.

In 1789 Thibault and Anreith were joined by Hermann Schutte, an architect and builder from Bremen and the three of them had a profound influence on the development of Cape Town architecture in the late 18th and early 19th centuries. The triumvirate of Thibault, Anreith and Schutte would for many years work out of a workshop in the Castle.

=== The Kat Balcony ===
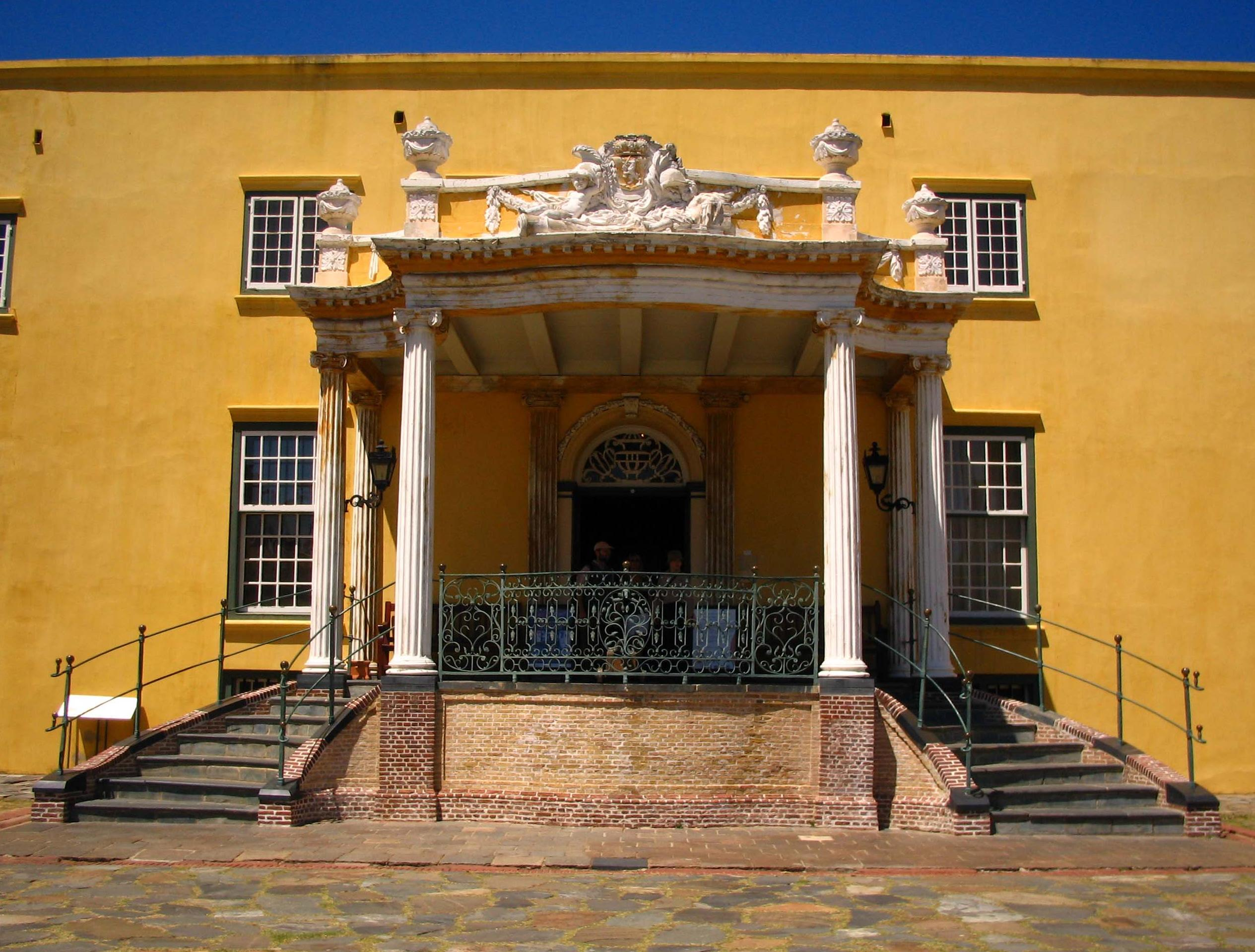
Kat Balcony, Castle of Good Hope

During the years 1785 to 1791, Governor of the Dutch East India Company Colony Cornelis Jacob van de Graaff made a number of improvements to the Castle of Good Hope. These included a portal to the Governor's residence, called the Kat Balcony. (Note: "Kat" is a Dutch term for a transverse wall. It dates from Roman times when it also meant a seat of authority or place of command on a battlefield. (References: Cape Town Highlanders "De Kat Balcony". Archived from the original on 2011-10-05., Dirk Teeuwen (2007) Kasteel De Goede Hoop "Archived copy" (PDF). Archived from the original (PDF) on 2011-07-24.)) Anreith produced a painted teak portico and entrance portal. The stucco parapet, Ionic columns, folding door and fanlight, along with teak lion doorknockers, are signature Anreith.

=== Other works ===
Anreith undoubtedly executed the carvings and fanlights at Rust en Vreugd. At the Herzog House, 131 Bree Street, a pedimental relief of Mercury as a boy (circa 1790), was removed when the house was demolished in 1970. His work is evident at the Koopmans-de Wet House, and the Huguenot Memorial Museum in Franschhoek, where some woodwork of the demolished Saasveld House survives.

The Lioness Gateway in the Company's Gardens survives, although the accompanying Lion Gateway is now a replica. The Lioness Gateway used to serve as entrance to the Company's menagerie, an area now occupied by the Michaelis School of Fine Art.

In addition to his sculpture and plaster-work, Anreith made a living teaching life drawing and geometry. He was also head of the first art school in South Africa which was founded by the Freemasons. He became a Freemason in 1797 as a member of the Lodge de Goede Hoop, for which he designed a number of lime plaster statues, of which three survived a fire in 1892: a Silence figure with an owl; a recumbent man with a dagger, book and hourglass; and a weeping woman and child.

During the Batavian Republic (1803–1806), Anreith and Thibault created a drinking fountain for the Parade, no longer extant but echoed in the design of the Hurling Pump in Oranjezicht. Anreith was responsible for the lion's mask carving on the pump.

Anton Anreith's later years were marked by poverty, loneliness and a decline in the quality of his work due to frailty. He died in 1822, at his residence at 8 Bloem Street, Cape Town.

== Gallery ==
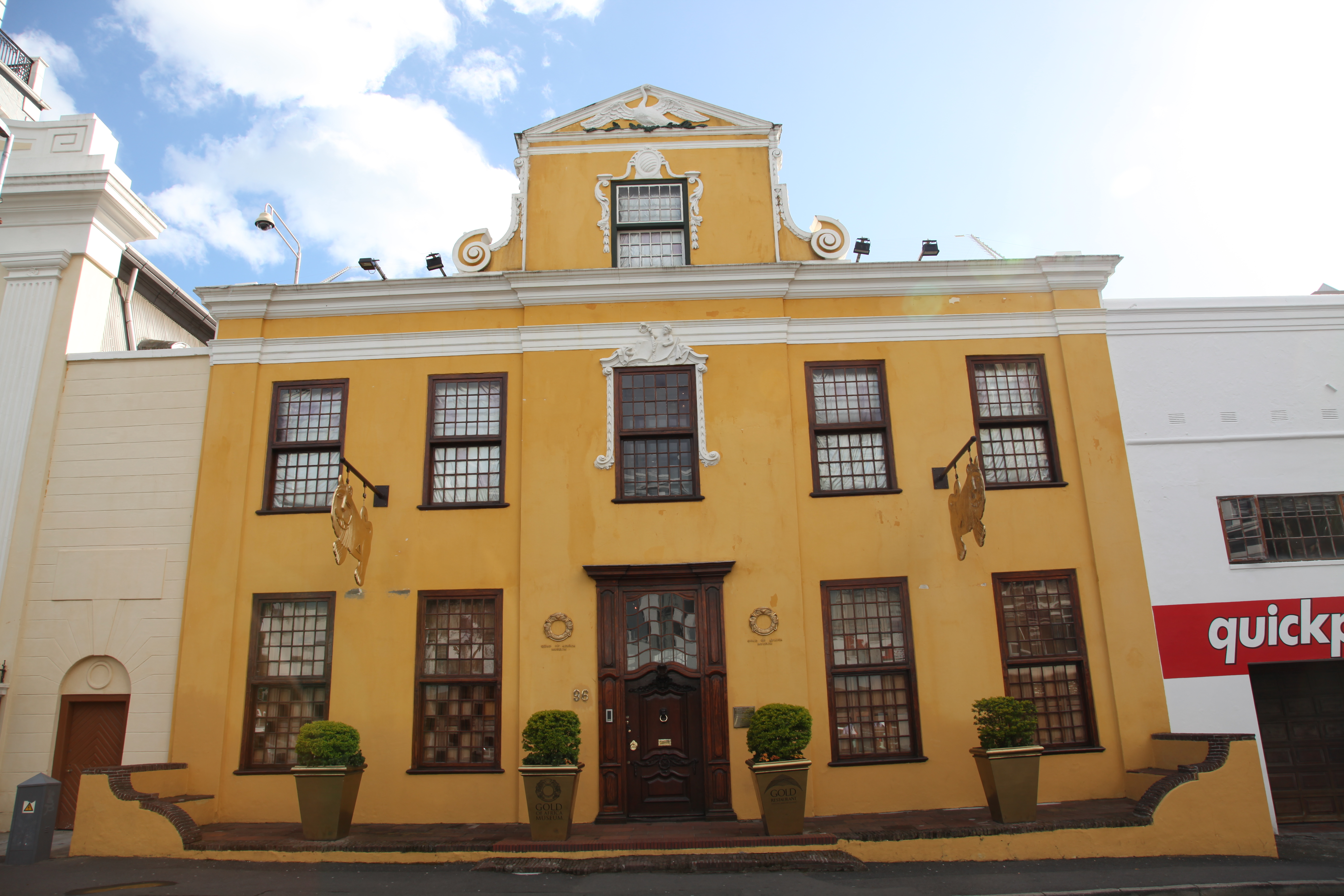
Martin Melck House in Strand Street

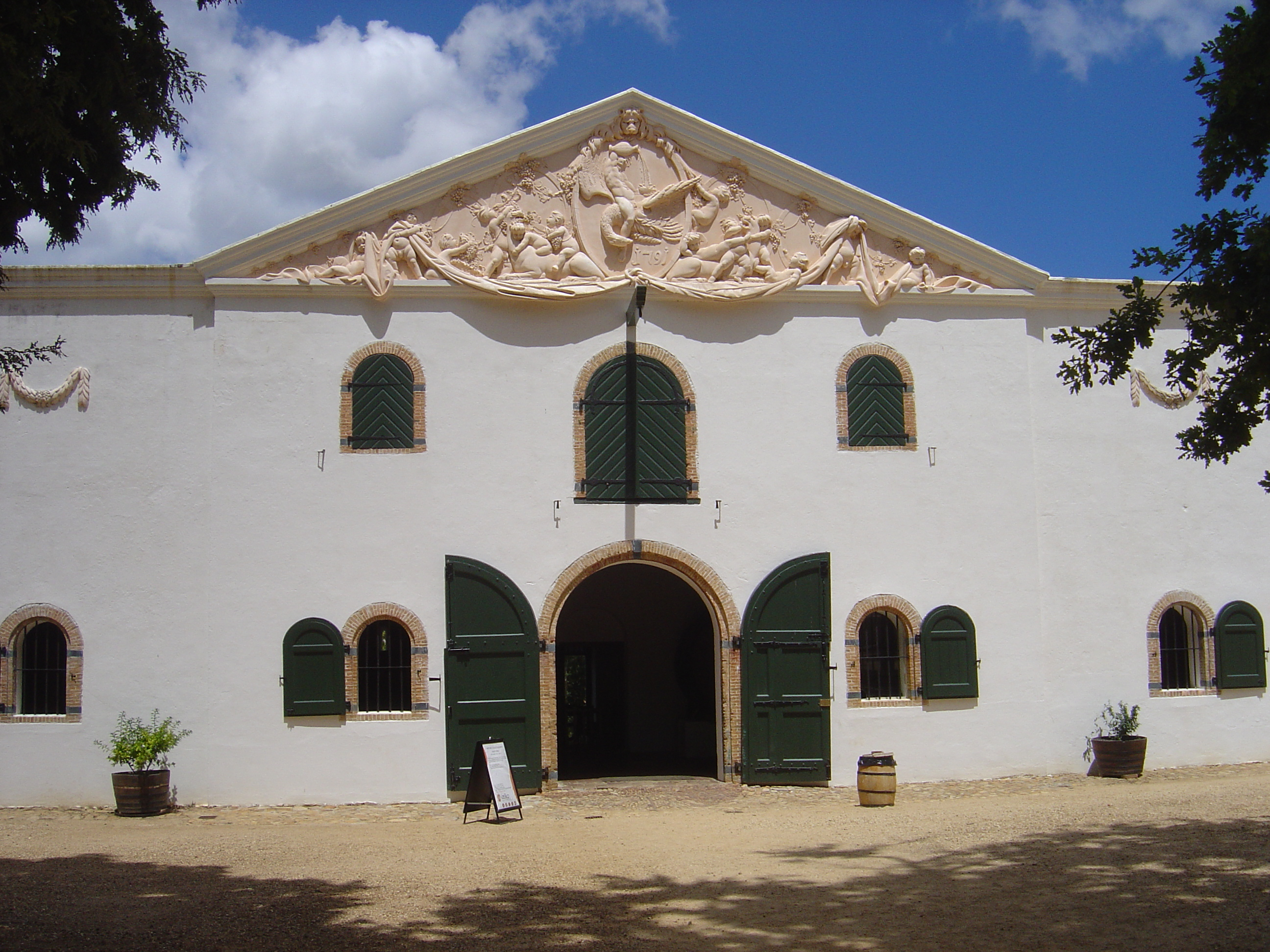
Cloete cellar at Groot Constantia

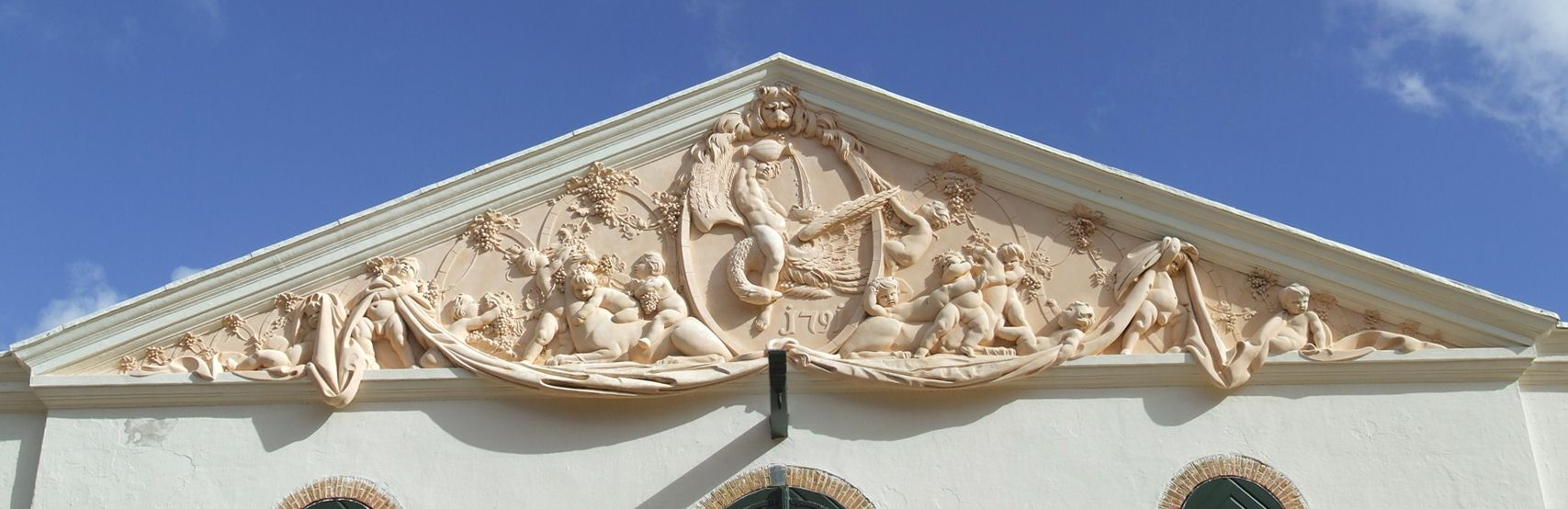
Close up of the pediment gable "The Rape of Ganymede" by sculptor Anton Anreith.

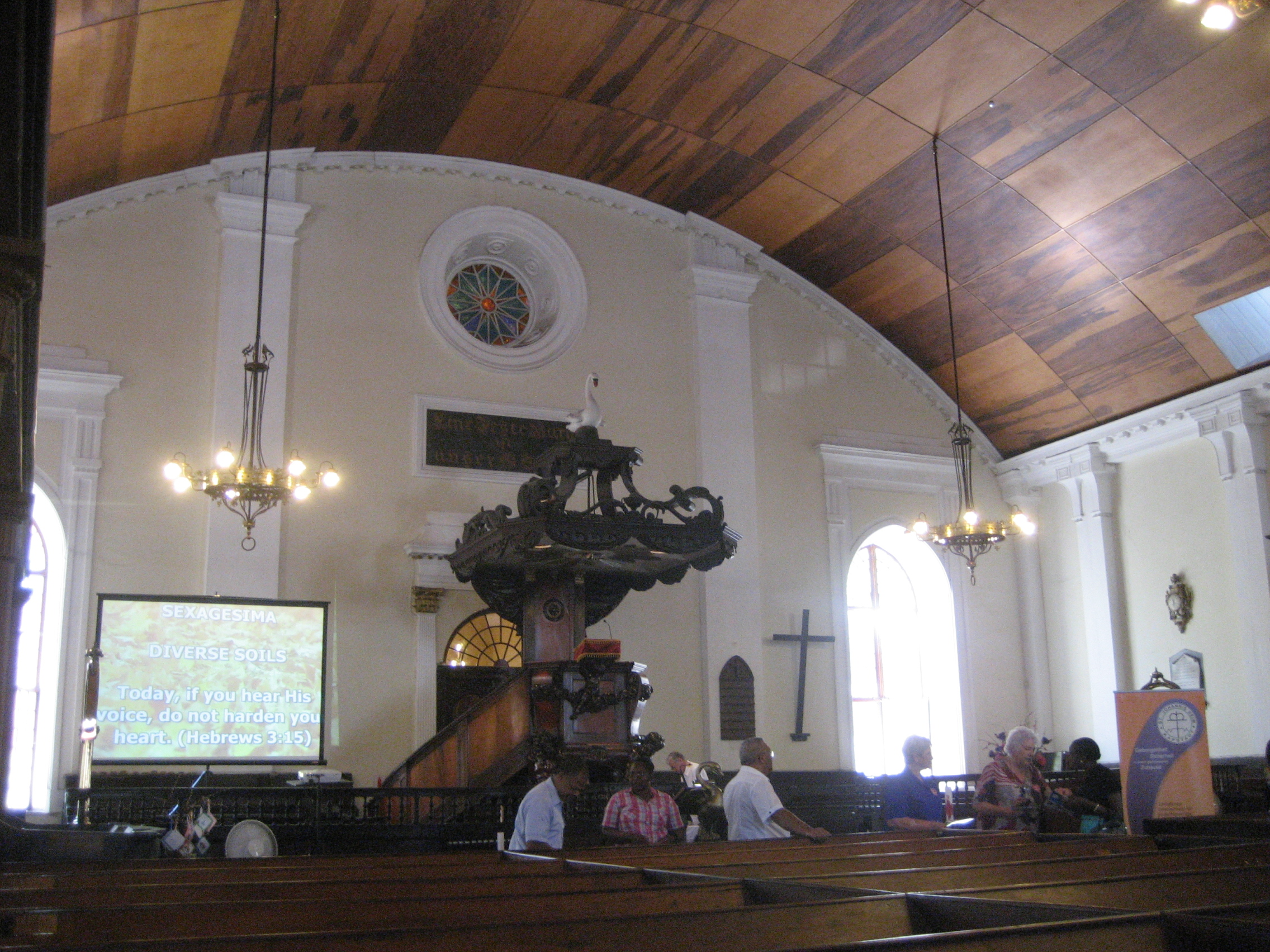
Pulpit, Lutheran Church Cape Town (1785–86)

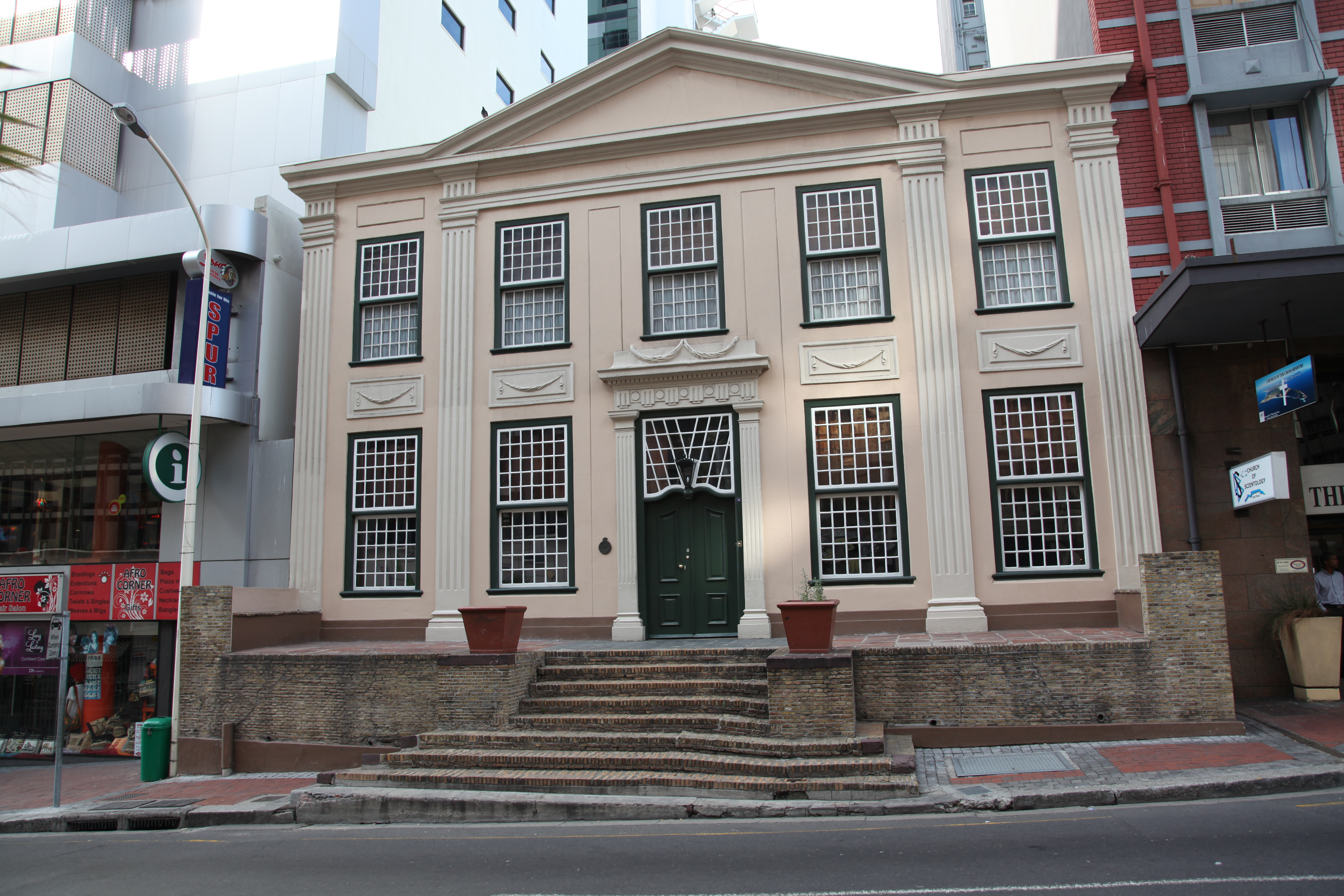
Koopmans-de Wet House, Cape Town

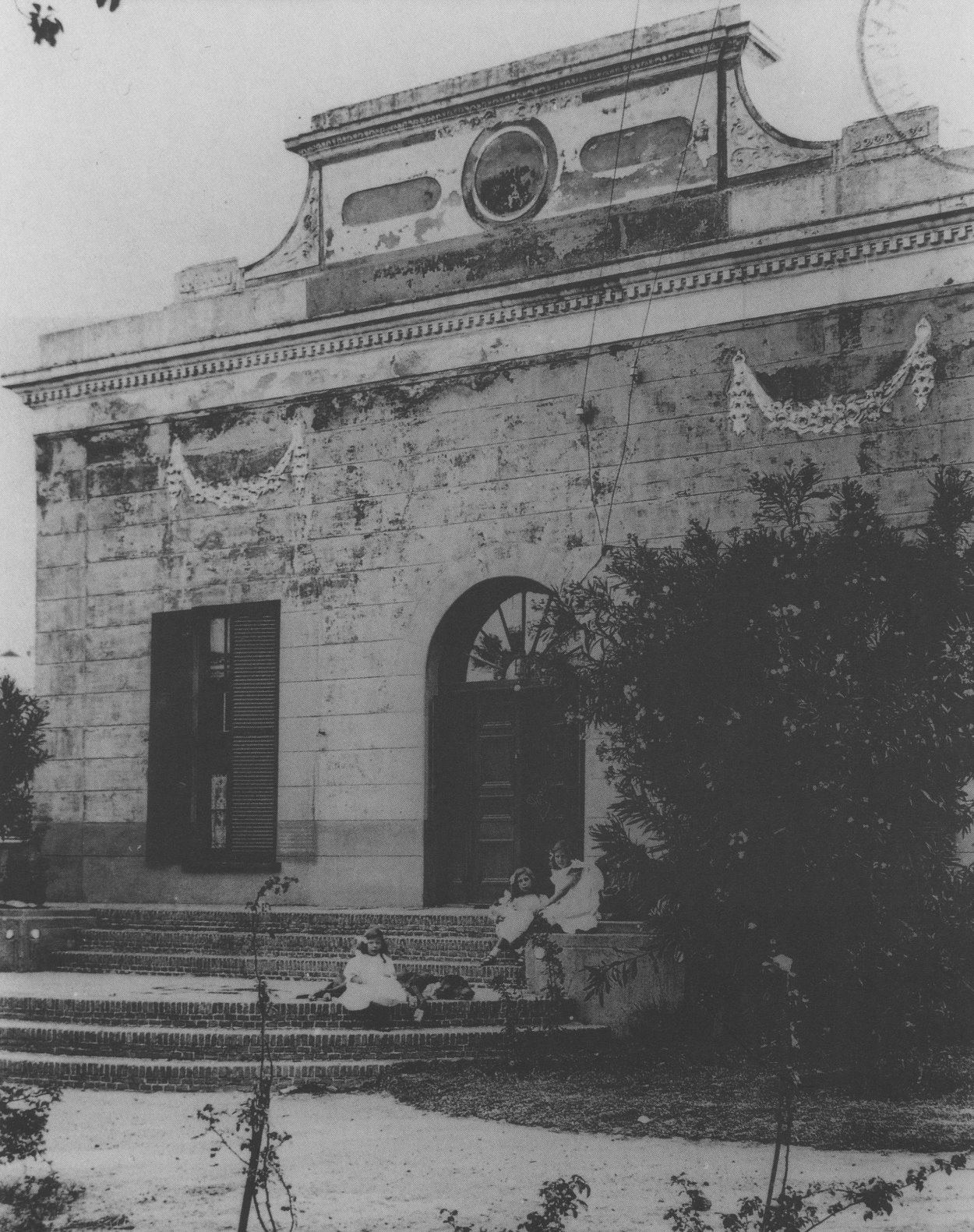
Saasveld House, Cape Town

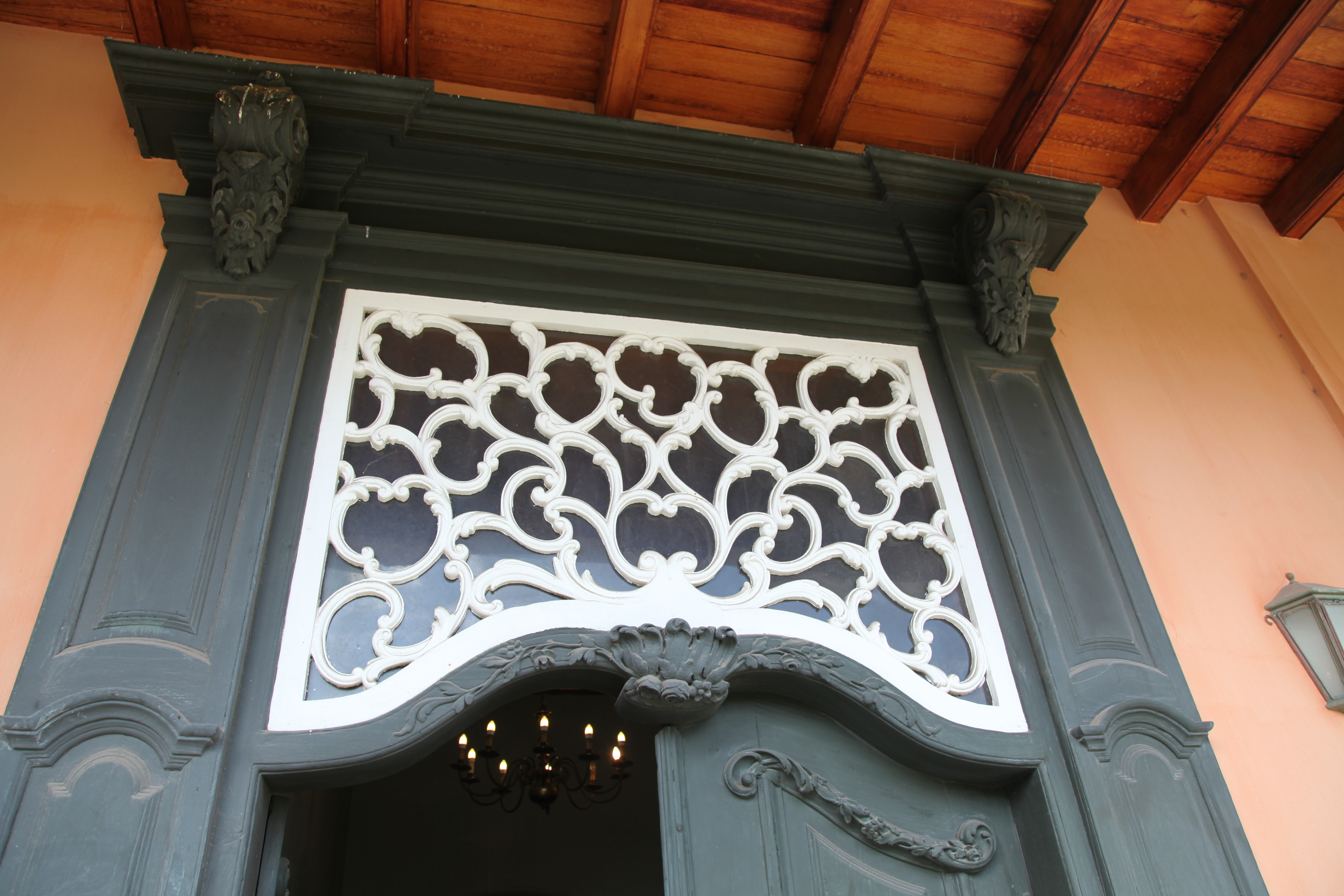
Rust-en-Vreugd fanlight, Cape Town

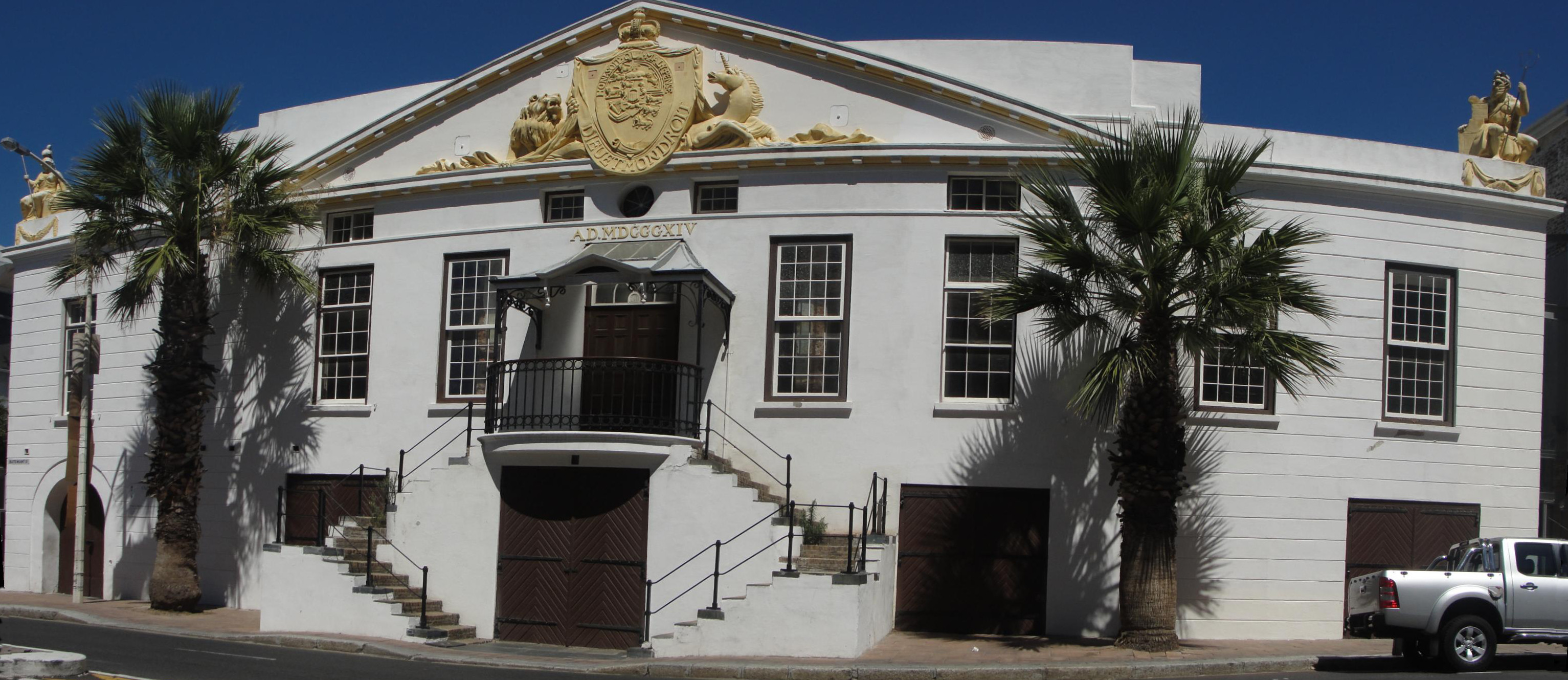
The Granary, Cape Town, with pediment work by Anton Anreith

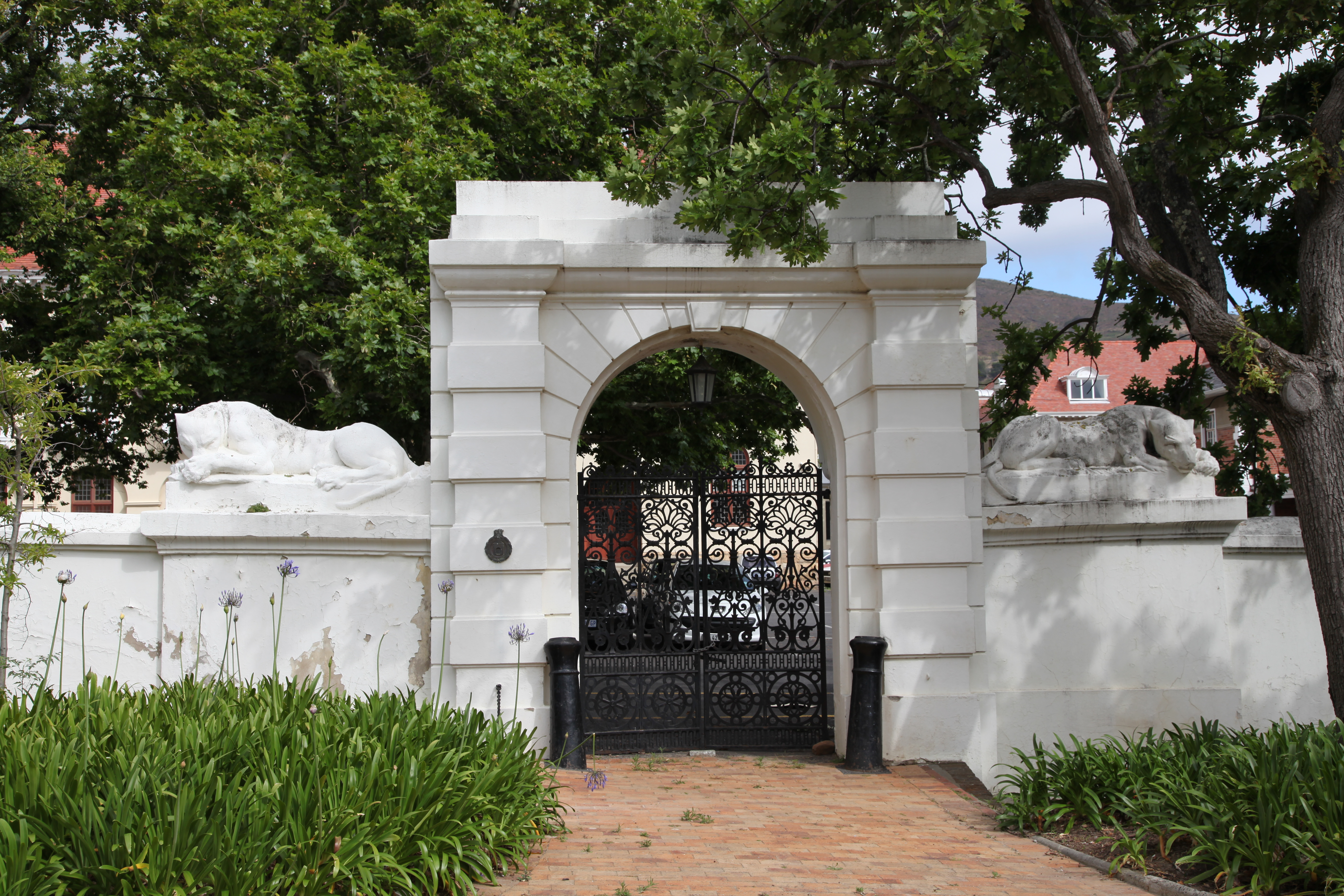
Lioness Gateway, Company's Gardens
