= Lutheran Church in Strand Street =

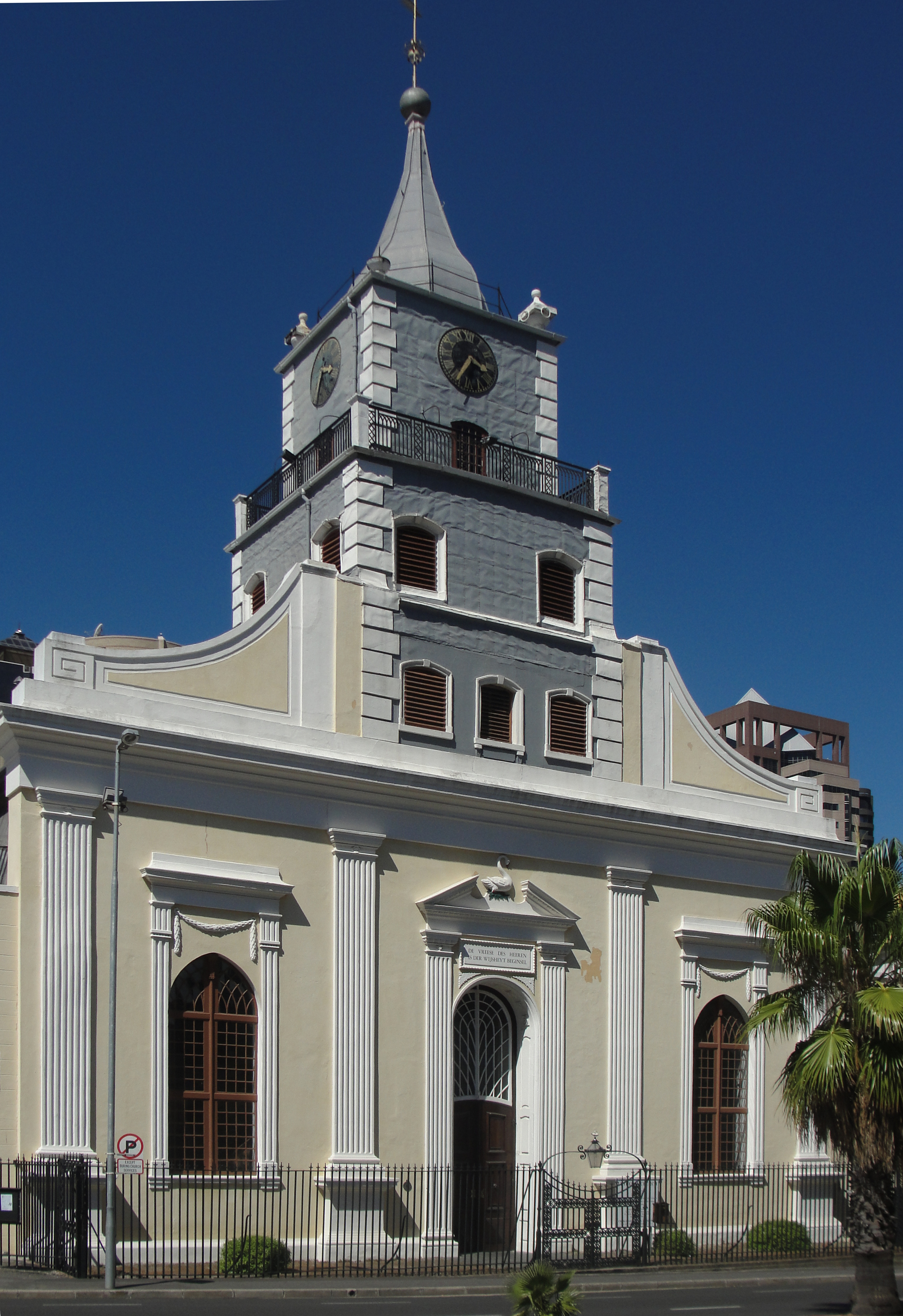

- Location within Cape Town
- 33.918939°S 18.419561°E
- Location: Cape Town, Western Cape
- Country: South Africa
- Denomination: Lutheranism

History
- Founded: 1780

Architecture
- Heritage designation: National Monument and Urban Conservation Area
- Architect: Anton Anreith
- Completed: 1792

The Lutheran Church in Strand Street in Cape Town is one of the oldest church buildings in South Africa, dating back to 1792. It was declared a National Monument in 1949.

== Background ==
In 1740 a few hundred residents of the greater Cape area were Lutherans. Lutheran Pastors from Denmark and Sweden whose ships were passing through Table Bay were allowed to preach, administer Holy Communion, baptize babies and confirme members. This was done on land after they had docked. Baron Gustaaf Willem van Imhoff drew up a memorandum to the Here XVII ("Lords seventeen")(Here XVII was the controlling body of the Dutch East India Company) in 1741, asking that Lutherans in the Cape be allowed to have their own congregations. It was unsuccessful. In 1741 the Politieke Raad (The local government body) determined that there were 509 Lutherans. 64 Lutherans requested to have their own congregation in 1742. This was followed by requests of other Lutherans in 1743, 1751, 1753, 1778 and 1779. Request came from the bigger area including Swellendam. Approval was given on 18 October 1779. The first congregation had 442 people, 415 men and 27 women.

== Building used ==
They used a warehouse in Strand Street close to the sea. This was given to them by Martin Melck. From 1787 to 1792 several alterations and additions were made to the building. Anton Anreith created the front elevation of the building, the figure of King David with his harp on the organ loft, the façade of the organ and the pulpit. A memorial plaque for Martin Melck is at the entrance of church.

== First pastor ==
Members JW Hurter, C Nelson and others expressed their wishes to have Christiaan Frederik Blettermann as their first pastor; however Governor Joachim van Plettenberg opted for Andreas Lutgerus Kolver, from Rotterdam the Netherlands. The inaugural service was on 10 December 1780.

== Additions ==
In 1812 the church received an organ and in 1820 a clock tower was added to the buildings

== Monument status and conservation ==
In 1949 it was declared as a national monument.

The church is also declared an urban conservation area.

== Modern day ==
Today it is the oldest church building in South Africa and church services are still held in the building every Sunday.
