= Golden Acre (Cape Town) =

Shopping mall in Cape Town CBD

- Interactive map of the Golden Acre area

General information
- Type: Current: shopping mall Future: Mixed-use development with residential and retail space
- Location: Adderley Street, Cape Town, Western Cape
- Coordinates: 33.9227486°S 18.4231529°E
- Current tenants: Ackermans, Foschini, PEP, Totalsports, American Swiss, and Capitec, among others
- Completed: Shopping mall: 1979; 47 years ago
- Opening: Scheduled for 2027; 1 year's time
- Renovated: Commenced in February 2026; 5 months ago
- Owner: Putirex
- Landlord: Neighbourgood (2027 onwards)

Technical details
- Floor count: 24 (2025)
- Floor area: 33,590 m^{2} (361,600 sq ft) (2025)

Renovating team
- Renovating firm: GVK-Siya Zama (contractors); Gracht Asset Managers (project manager)

Other information
- Number of stores: 105 (2025)
- Parking: ~ 800 (2025)

Website
- golden-acre.co.za

Golden Acre is a shopping mall on the corner of Adderley and Strand Streets in the central business district of Cape Town, South Africa. The building is set to be redeveloped into a mixed-use development, featuring affordable housing and retail space. Construction of the new building is scheduled for October 2025, and it is planned to open in 2027.

== History ==
The building was constructed in 1979 by South African financial services company Sanlam on an old train station site. In 1975, excavations during the construction process revealed remnants of the northern portion of a storage dam built in 1663 where the coast line once was.

=== Shopping mall ===
Opening in 1979, Golden Acre has served as a shopping mall in Cape Town CBD for decades, and has not been modernized for many years.

The mall has over 65,000 square meters of retail space, and around 800 parking bays.

This mall used to house a Ster-Kinekor cinema before it was closed down in the early-2000s.

Tenants as of July 2020 include Ackermans, Shoprite and Mr Price.

=== Major redevelopment ===
In February 2025, Golden Acre's sale to Putirex, a joint venture between multiple Cape Town-based property developers, was confirmed by the South African Competition Commission. The mall was sold for R781.5 million.

In August 2024, architectural planning began for Golden Acre's redevelopment. The new building is planned to feature residential space, including affordable housing, as well as a 6,000m² communal garden and lifestyle clubhouse for residents. The renovated building will also have a redesigned retail space, which is set to operate for 18 hours a day.

Part of the planning is the construction of 417 affordable, semi-serviced, residential rental units, with 302 studios, 1-, and 2-bed units reserved for long-term tenants. The units, ranging from 24m2 to 70m2, are intended to be priced at approximately 30% below other residential rental options currently available in Cape Town CBD. They will be aimed at young, aspirational employees who are currently commuting into the city on a daily basis. The remaining 115 units will be for short-term rentals of up to three months. None of the residential units will be sold to private investors. Rentals were set to start at R10,500 per month.

In 2025, Cape Town Mayor, Geordin Hill-Lewis, welcomed the planned development, stating that it would significantly contribute towards the ongoing revitalization of Cape Town CBD. James Vos, the City of Cape Town’s Mayoral Committee Member for Economic Growth, said the new building aligned perfectly with the City’s goal of creating an accessible and inclusive urban environment.

With contractors confirmed, construction on the new building is set to begin in October 2025, with completion scheduled for 2027.

The first phase of development, on the Piazza Level, began in February 2026, with a 1-year completion timeline.

In July 2026, news24 journalists were invited to tour the first completed apartment at Golden Acre. At the time, the first 100 apartments were set to be ready by October 2026.
