= Louis Michel Thibault =

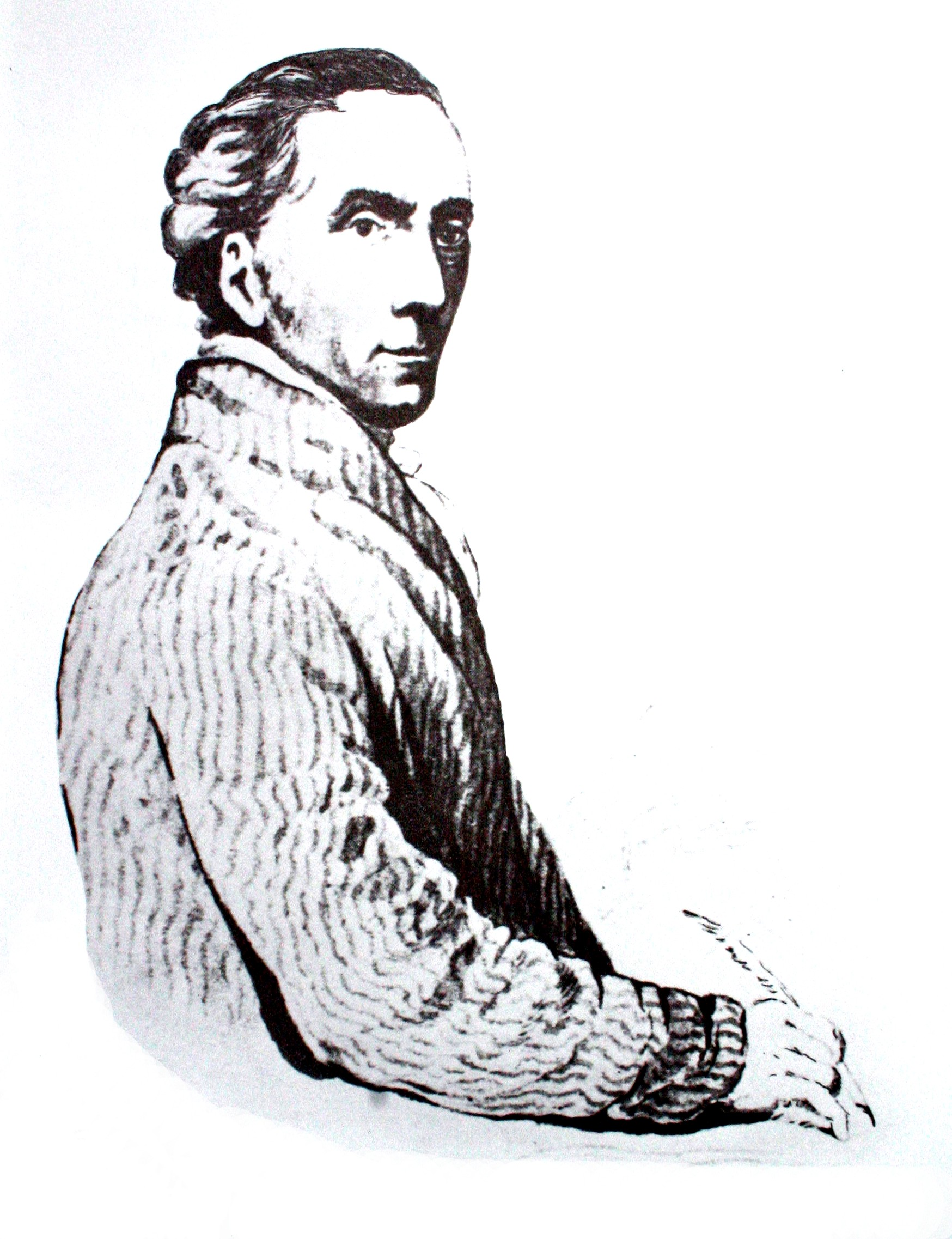
- Louis Michel Thibault by Lady Anne Barnard, Cape Archives
- Born: 29 September 1750; Picquigny, Picardy, France
- Died: 15 November 1815 (aged 65)
- Occupations: Architect and Engineer

Signature
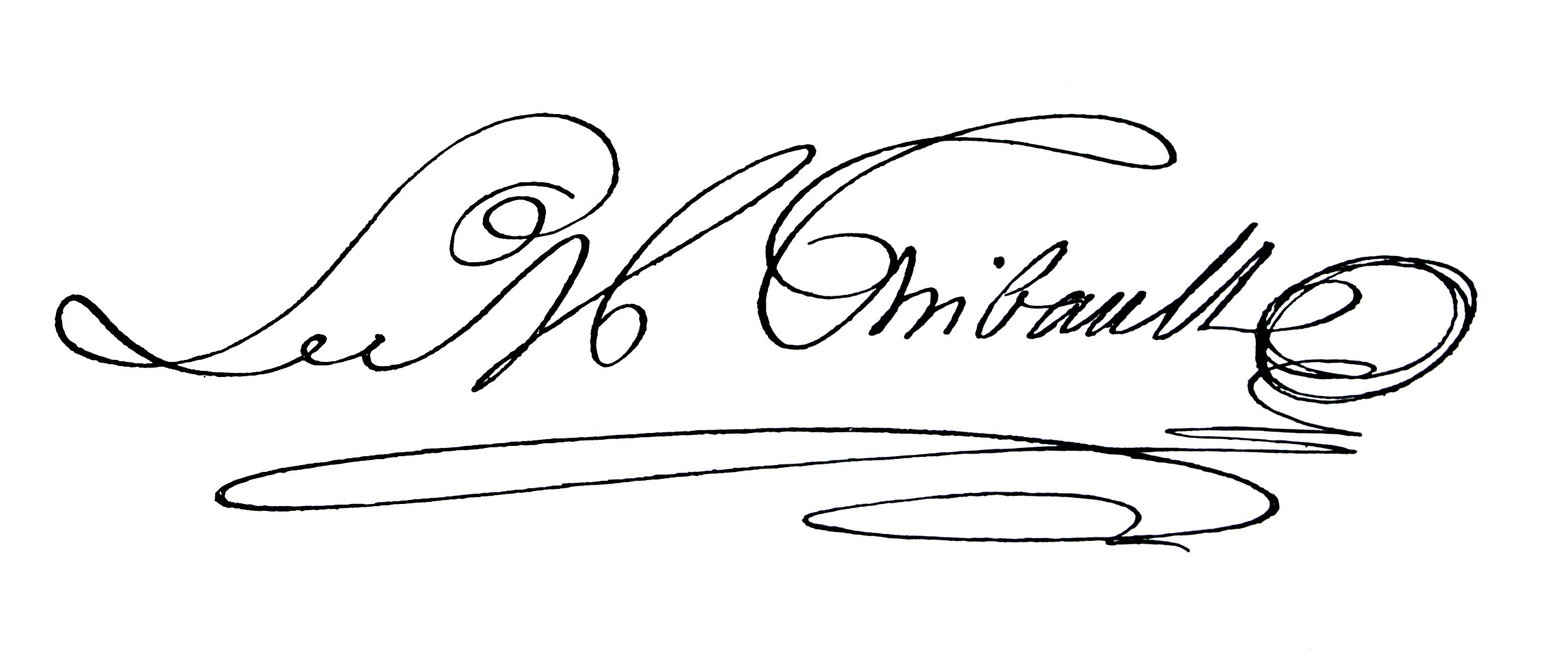

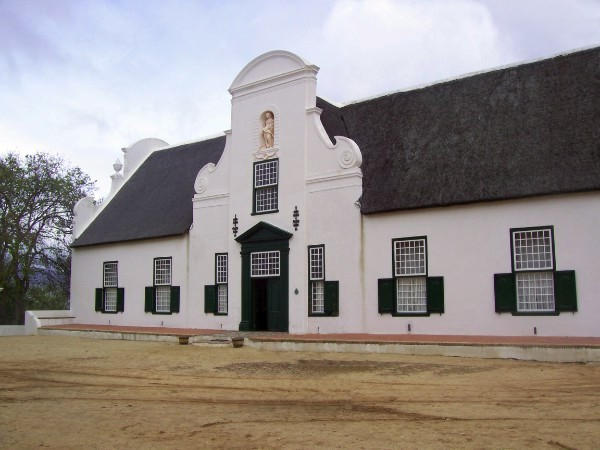
Groot Constantia

Drostdy, Graaff-Reinet

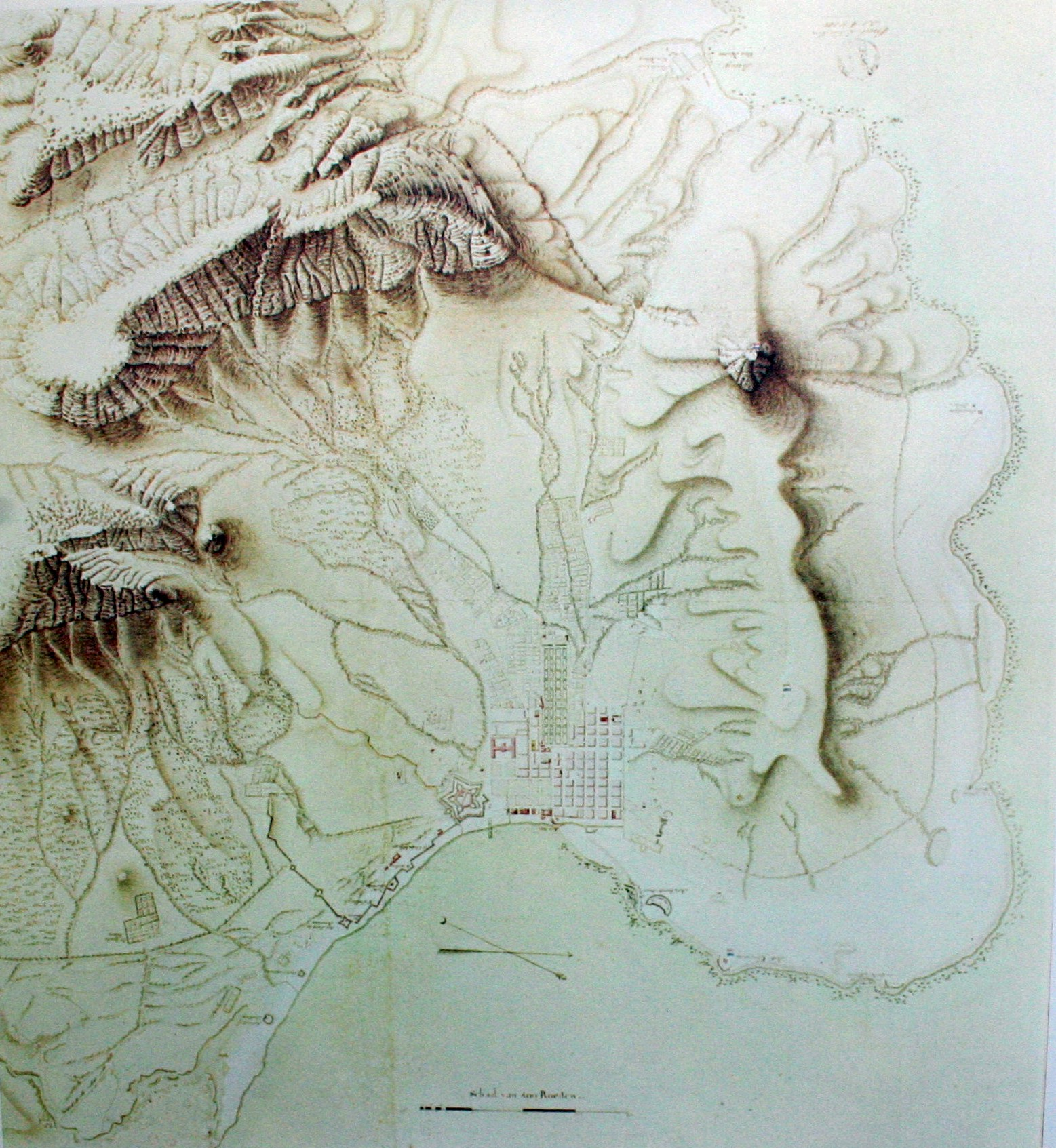
Cape Town and environs 1791, Map by Thibault, Delft Archives

Louis Michel Thibault (28 September 1750 – 15 November 1815), was a French-born architect and engineer who designed numerous buildings in the Cape Colony. He was Cape Colony's first trained architect and brought with him a distinctive mannered neo-classicism.

== Life and career ==
Born 28 September 1750 in Picquigny, Picardy in France, Thibault was trained at the Royal Academy of Architecture in Paris. At the time, the academy under Ange-Jacques Gabriel, was regarded as the best architectural training in the world. Gabriel was an architect in the classical tradition, and had an important formative influence on Thibault's style. After qualifying at the academy, details of the next few years of Thibault's life are unknown. It is known, however, that he studied military engineering in Paris under the sponsorship of Colonel Charles Daniel de Meuron.

Cape under Dutch occupation to 1795 The Swiss mercenary DeMeuron Regiment in the service of the Dutch East India Company, arrived in Cape Town on 7 January 1783 with Lieutenant Thibault among them, only to re-embark almost immediately on the Hermione to Ceylon where they were to assist French Admiral Suffren. Ceylon had been under Dutch rule since 1665, but in the latter part of the 18th century, the British began to move eastward from India. In Ceylon, the DeMeuron Regiment took part in the expulsion of the British from Cuddalore, which had been occupied by the English under General Stuart.

Two other regiments, the Régiment de Pondichéry and the mercenary Legion of the Prince of Luxemburg, were posted at the Cape and landed in Cape Town in April 1782 by order of Admiral de Suffren to reinforce the resistance of France's Dutch ally and prevent their mutual enemy, Britain, from capturing the Cape. After peace in Ceylon, the DeMeuron Regiment shared garrison duty with the Régiment de Pondichéry, in Cape Town.

On 5 August 1785 he transferred to the Dutch East India Company, retaining his rank, and in February 1786 was appointed Company building inspector under Captain Sebastiaan Willem van de Graaff, son of the Governor. In August 1786 he was chosen to direct the School of Cadets started by the Governor; his duties included being Professor of Mathematics and Military Science. Thibault settled in a place that came to be known as the Brand House, and later the Wale Street police-station. Between 1786 and 1790 Thibault designed all new public buildings and a number of private houses. From this date on Thibault's work is associated with that of Anton Anreith, a young sculptor and woodcarver from Freiburg, who had arrived as a soldier in the company's service in 1777, and with Hermann Schutte, a young architect and builder from Bremen who arrived in 1789. In 1790 the Dutch East India Company was virtually bankrupt and all work on public buildings and fortifications was stopped. Private commissions, however, continued unabated. In 1788 Thibault had been promoted from lieutenant of engineers to captain and by 1795 to chief military engineer. Before and during the British occupation of the Cape, Thibault was obliged to carry out orders from Colonels de Lille and Gordon, which as an accomplished military strategist, he knew to be unsound.

Cape under British occupation 1795–1803 It was in that capacity that he and Major Georg Kũhler drew up an inventory of the assets of the liquidated Dutch East India Company in 1795, when the British occupied the Cape. Thibault lost all the privileges of rank and became a civilian once more.

Major-General James Henry Craig, who was acting governor at the Cape from 1795 to 1797, discovered that Thibault was compiling a map of the Colony. Craig proposed that Thibault donate the map to him in return for the position of royal geographical engineer – an offer which Thibault declined, also turning down a later offer of 100 guineas. Craig was succeeded by Earl Macartney and Major-General Francis Dundas. In 1799 Dundas put Thibault in charge of repairs to military buildings as an architect. When Sir George Yonge, 5th Bt (1731–1812) replaced Dundas as Governor, he appointed Thibault as architect of military works under his aide-de-camp.

Cape under Dutch rule 1803–1806 As he had sworn allegiance to England, Thibault went through a period of disfavour when the Cape was returned to the Dutch. Nevertheless, he was appointed Inspector of Public Buildings, which allowed him to design all new public buildings, and supervise their construction and repair.

Cape under British occupation 1806 onwards
Despite Thibault's having served under General JW Janssens in the field, Sir David Baird who had become Acting Governor, reappointed him Inspector of Public Buildings. The British though preferred their Georgian Colonial architecture and used their own architects, so that Thibault had very few commissions. He accordingly became a sworn surveyor in 1807 and in 1811 followed Jan Willem Wernich as Government surveyor.

The final years of his life were largely taken up with surveying properties on the road from Cape Town to Simonstown. In 1811 a special commission was appointed to determine the extent of land around Cape Town which was not in private hands and therefore regarded as "disposable" by the Government. This led to beacons and boundaries frequently being moved by the Commission over the objections raised by Thibault. His health rapidly deteriorated during this time and he died on 15 November 1815 of pneumonia, believed by his widow to have been brought on by his working in the cold and wet. He was buried in the Somerset graveyard, at a point now under the lower part of the Buitengracht.

== Family ==
On 2 April 1786, Louis Michel Thibault married Elizabeth van Schoor d. 11 June 1820, daughter of an old Cape family.
Children:

1. Catharina Everdina Thibault b. 7 January 1787 – spinster, survived to her eighties
2. Maria Johanna Louisa Thibault b. 30 November 1788 – spinster
3. Elisabeth Meinhardina Thibault b. 12 September 1790 m. 14 March 1814 to John Humphreys, Lieutenant 1st battalion of Inniskillen
  1. Catharina Maria Georgina Humphreys b.1829
4. Louis Michel Adrien Thibault b. 16 December 1792 (died in infancy)

Thibault died in Cape Town on 15 November 1815.

== Buildings ==
Even though his association with Anreith and Schutte was not a legal partnership, they worked together whenever possible, having complete faith in each other's professional competence and integrity. A fourth person, the wood-worker JJ Graaff, worked with them on so many projects that he is normally included in references to the partnership. Except for Anreith, who was a confirmed bachelor and lived in a modest house in Bloem Street, the others helped each other out with modifications and additions to their respective homes. Graaff's house at 14 Keerom Street had changes by way of an upper storey with cornice and architrave with fluted pilasters at the front door. Thibault bought the house at 17 Heerengracht, site of the present Markham's building.

=== Some of Thibault's important works ===
- Papenboom, Newlands for Dirk Gysbert van Reenen (1787–88). Well depicted by J. Barrow's watercolour in Africana Museum, Johannesburg. Destroyed by fire in the 19th century.
- Freemasonry Lodge de Goede Hoop (1801–03), Stal Plein, Cape Town. Served as the Cape Parliament 1854–1884. Still standing
- Fountain on the Parade (1805–07). Demolished in 1814 as a good water reticulation system had made it unnecessary.
- Drostdy, Graaff-Reinet (1804–05). Still standing but renovated and modernised.
- Drostdy, Tulbagh (1804–7). Restored after storm in 1822, fire in 1934 and earthquake in 1969.
- Guardhouse at top of Government Avenue, Cape Town (1804). Demolished.
- Customs-house in the Buitenkant (1814). Used as Public Works Department offices. Still standing.
- Conversion of slave lodge at top of Heerengracht, Cape Town into Government offices and Supreme Court (1814–15). Still standing and occupied by the Iziko Slave Lodge.

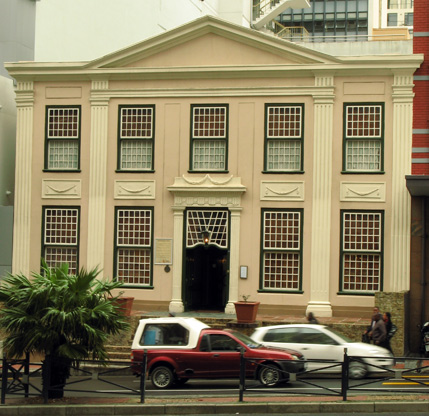
Koopmans-De Wet House, Cape Town

=== Buildings attributed to Thibault ===
- Facade of Tokai in Constantia for AGH Teubes(1795)
- Vredenhof, Noorder-Paarl for Gerhard van der Bijl (1806–1812)
- Guardhouse, pavilions and gateway of slave enclosure Rustenburg, Rondebosch for Jan Hoets (1806–1812)
- Koopmans-de Wet House, Cape Town
- Groot Constantia wine-cellar, Cape Peninsula for Hendrik Cloete (1791)
- Front gable and gateways for Stellenburg (now Stellenberg), Wynberg for Johan Isaac Rhenius (1791–92)
- Groot Constantia homestead, Cape Peninsula for Hendrik Cloete (probably 1792–93)
- De Wet House, Tulbagh for Catharina Margaretha Hugo widow of Jacobus de Wet
- Ballotina, Tulbagh (1815) for Wilhelmina Cruywagen widow of Rev. HW Ballot
- Manor House on Uitkyk Wine Estate near Muldersvlei: Doors carved by Anreith
