= African daisy =

African daisy is a common name for several plants and may refer to:

- These genera in the family Asteraceae
  - Arctotis
  - Dimorphotheca
  - Gazania
  - Gerbera
  - Lonas
  - Osteospermum

== See also ==
- List of African daisy diseases
