= Annie Porter =

English zoologist (1880–1963)

Annie Porter, married name Fantham (20 February 1880 – 8 May 1963) was an English zoologist and Honorary Parasitologist to the Zoological Society of London. She worked at the Quick Laboratory in Cambridge, and was head of parasitology at the South African Institute for Medical Research in Johannesburg. She also lectured at the University of Witwatersrand and McGill University in Canada. Porter was a fellow of the Royal Society of South Africa and the Zoological Society of London, and was awarded the South Africa Medal in 1927.

== Life ==
Annie Porter was the daughter of Samuel Porter of Brighton. She was born on 20 February 1880 in Sussex, and grew up in Brighton. She earned a Bachelor of Science with honours in botany at the University College London in 1905, after which she moved to the Quick Laboratory in Cambridge, where she was an assistant in helminthology. In 1910 she was awarded a DSc for six parasitology papers. From 1914 to 1917, she was Beit Memorial Research Fellow at the University of Cambridge. In 1915 she married fellow zoologist Harold Benjamin Fantham (died 1937). Porter continued to use her maiden name for her publications after her marriage. In 1914 Porter and Fantham co-authored Some Minute Animal Parasites, for which Porter draw most of the fifty-six illustrations.

From 1917 to 1933, Porter was Head of the Department of Parasitology at the South African Institute for Medical Research in Johannesburg. She was also Senior Lecturer in Parasitology at the University of the Witwatersrand. From 1933 to 1938, she was a research associate in zoology at McGill University. Porter was president of the South African Geographical Society in 1924, and a fellow of the Royal Society of South Africa. She was awarded the South Africa Medal in 1927.

Porter moved to England after her husband died in October 1937. She was a fellow of the Zoological Society of London, and she was invited to the position of Honorary Parasitologist to the Society by Sir Julian Huxley. Porter died of diverticulitis and bronchopneumonia at St Pancras Hospital in London on 9 May 1963, and was buried at Mill Road Cemetery in Cambridge.

== Works ==
- (with Harold Benjamin Fantham) 'The structure and homology of the microsporidian spore as seen in Nosema apis', Proceedings of the Cambridge Philosophical Society, Vol, 16, Pt. 7 (1912)
- (with Harold Benjamin Fantham) Some minute animal parasites: or, Unseen foes in the animal world, London: Methuen & Co., 1914
- A survey of the intestinal entozoa, both protozoal and helminthic, observed among natives in Johannesburg, from June to November, 1917, Johannesburg: South African Institute for Medical Research, 1918
- On the effects of cold on the vitality of certain Cysticerci and Echinococci in meat kept under commercial conditions of freezing in Johannesburg, Johannesburg: South African Institute for Medical Research, 1923
- 'Surgical & parasitological notes on four cases of intestinal obstruction due to accumulation of very large numbers of round worms: (Ascaris lumbricoides)', British Journal of Surgery, Vol. 11, No. 43 (1924), pp. 432–38.
- 'Note on a porocephalid found in a shangaan in South Africa', South African Journal of Science, Vol. 25 (December 1928), pp. 359–363.
- 'Notes on the Distribution of Animal Parasites in Street Dust examined in Johannesburg from 1923 to 1928', The Journal of the Medical Association of South Africa, 1928
- Some remarks on the hookworm problem in South Africa, Johannesburg: South African Association for the Advancement of Science, 1929
- 'Certain animal parasites affecting man in South Africa', The Journal of the Medical Association of South Africa, Vol. 4, pp. 471–74
- The larval Trematoda found in certain South African Mollusca with special reference to schistosomiasis (bilharziasis), Johannesburg: South African Institute for Medical Research, 1938
