= Silver Medal (Zoological Society of London) =

The Silver Medal of the Zoological Society of London is "Awarded to a Fellow of the Society or any other person for contributions to the understanding and appreciation of zoology, including such activities as public education in natural history, and wildlife conservation." It was first awarded in 1847.

== Winners (pre-1964) ==
Year	Recipient
1847	Roderick Murchison & M Dalmatoff
1859	Charles Canning, 1st Earl Canning & William Hay & Henry Ramsey & Brian Houghton Hodgson & H G Keene & Rajendra Mullick & Richard Green & William Dougal Christie
1860	George Grey & Gerald Chetwynd-Talbot
1862	George Bennett
1869	Rutherford Alcock
1872	A D Bartlett
1875	H H Seyyid Barghash bin Said
1877	Robert Hudson
1878	Frederick Richard Pollock
1882	John Dean Caton
1884	George H R Fisk
1887	The Maharajah of Kuch-Bechar
1889	Edward Dalzel Dickson
1891	Ursula Edmondston & Robert Thomas Charles Scott
1893	Donald Cameron of Lochiel & John Peter Grant of Rothiemurchus
1894	Henry Hamilton Johnston
1897	Alexander Whyte
1900	John Ernest Matcham
1902	Edmund William Harper
1904	Arthur Thomson
1907	Adam White Guthrie
1908	David Seth-Smith & William Ingram
1909	Charles Dunell Rudd & Richard Bowen Woosnam
1910	Carl Hagenbeck
1912	J Stevenson Hamilton
1914	R E Drake-Brockman & Albert Pam & W K Pomeroy & H G F Spurrell
1917	Wilfred A Smithers
1921	John Young & Cecil H. Armitage
1926	Henry Courtney Brocklehurst
1931	A St Alban Smith
1937	E B Carter
1938	Gerald Cope Upstone
1942	Alfred Ezra & Geoffrey Marr Vevers
1945	Dorothy Pinto-Leite
1946	William Chippendale
1952	Annie Porter
1953	Herbet F Vinall
1955	John Withers Lester
1958	Joao de Freitas Martins

== Winners (post-1964) ==
In 1964, the criteria for the Silver Medal were changed, split into 2 categories. Category 1 is awarded to individuals for curation or distinguished service to the Society, whilst Category 2 is awarded to fellows who have provided a significant contribution to the field of zoology, including in both wildlife conservation and public education of natural history.

Year	Category 1	Category 2
1964	George Burden Stratton	Lord Hurcomb
1965		David Attenborough
1966		Aubrey Buxton
1968		James Fisher
1969	F A P Stengelhofen	
1973	A J E Cave & Eirwen M Owen & L G Goodwin	
1974		Eric Hosking
1975		Gerald H Thompson
1983		Stephen Jay Gould
1984	E H Ashton	
1985		L. Harrison Matthews
1988		Richard Dawkins
1991	Owen C. Chamberlain	Jane Goodall
1993		Jonathan Kingdon
1997		George B. Rabb
1999	Michael Brambell	
2003	Peter Olney	Aubrey Manning
2004	John Chapple	
2005		Alastair Fothergill
2007		Scottish Ornithologists Club
2008		Rosie Trevelyan
2009		David Macdonald
2010		Michael McCarthy
2011		Martin Fisher
2012		Helen Roy
2013		Tim Birkhead
2014		Darren Mann
2015		Nathalie Pettorelli Seirian Sumner
2016		Richard Fortey
2017		Steve Jones
2018		James Barnett
