= John William Watson Stephens =

British parasitologist (1865–1946)

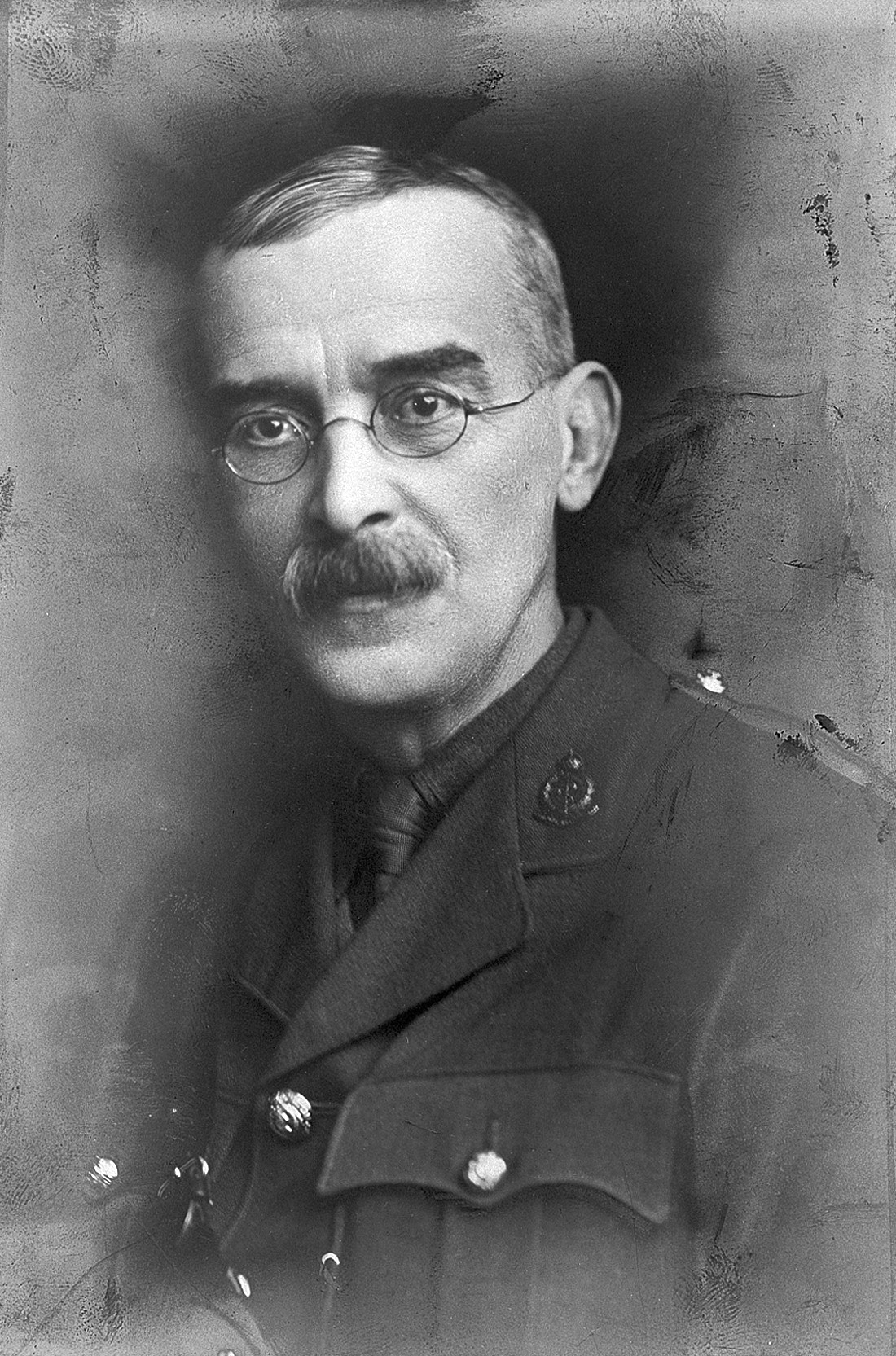
- photo courtesy of Wellcome Trust
- Born: John William Watson Stephens; 2 March 1865; Ferryside, Carmarthenshire, Wales
- Died: 17 May 1946 (aged 81)
- Awards: Fellow of the Royal Society (1920); Manson Medal (1935)

John William Watson Stephens FRS (1865–1946) was a British parasitologist and expert on tropical diseases.

After a term at Christ College, Brecon and then completion of secondary school at Dulwich College, Stephens matriculated in 1884 at Gonville and Caius College, Cambridge, graduating there with B.A. in 1887. He received his medical education at St Bartholomew's Hospital, receiving there M.B. and B.Chir. in 1893 and D.P.H. in 1894.

Stephens held in 1895–1886 a Sir Trevor Lawrence research studentship in pathology and bacteriology at St Bartholomew's Hospital and in 1897 a John Lucas Walker research studentship in pathology at Cambridge. He became in 1897 an Assistant Bacteriologist to the Government of India. In 1898–1902 he was a member of the Royal Society's malaria commission in Africa and India. At Liverpool School of Tropical Medicine he was from 1903 to 1913 the Walter Myers Lecturer in Tropical Medicine and, as the successor to Sir Ronald Ross, from 1913 to 1928 the Alfred Jones Professor of Tropical Medicine. In World War I he was a malaria consultant with rank of Lieutenant-Colonel, Royal Army Medical Corps. He was a member of the Colonial Medical Research Committee in 1927 and the president of the Royal Society of Tropical Medicine and Hygiene in 1927–1928.

Stephens and H. B. Fantham did pioneering work on sleeping sickness and were the first to distinguish Trypanosoma brucei rhodesiense from Trypanosoma brucei gambiense (although they called T. brucei gambiense and T. brucei rhodesiense by the names T. gambiense and T. rhodesiense, respectively — contrary to contemporary taxonomy).

There are several species of the protozoan parasite Plasmodium that cause malaria in humans. One such species, namely Plasmodium ovale, was first described in 1914 by Stephens in a blood sample taken from a patient in Pachmarhi, Madhya Pradesh in the autumn of 1913.

He married in 1901 and was the father of two sons.

He retired to Holcwm, Ferryside, Kidwelly. In 1935 he conducted archaeological excavations on the nearby hill of Allt Cunedda, but made little record. He did find, somewhere on the hill, the broken head of a stone hammer axe.

== Selected works ==
- with S. R. Christophers: The practical study of malaria and other blood parasites. 1903.
  - French translation, published 1906
- Blackwater fever: a historical survey and summary of observations made over a century. 1937; 727 pages
