= Jack Rose (colonel) =

South African analytical chemist (1876-1973)

President of South African Association for the Advancement of Science
- In office 1943–1944
- Preceded by: Pijper, A.
- Succeeded by: Chubb, E.C.

Grand Master of Lodge de Goede Hoop (South African Freemasons)
- In office 1944–1957
- Preceded by: Silberbauer, C.C.
- Succeeded by: Botha, C.G.

Personal details
- Born: John George Rose; 11 January 1876 Cape Town, Cape Colony
- Died: 20 February 1973 (aged 97) Cape Town, Cape Province
- Known for: Analytical chemistry, military career and Freemasonry

John George Rose (11 January 1876–20 February 1973) was a South African analytical chemist, an army officer in various wars and a Grand Master of the Freemasons of South Africa. He also held world records for human-paced cycling.

== Early life ==
Rose was born on 11 January 1876 in Cape Town, South Africa. He was the son of John Edwin Benjamin Rose (auditor-general of the Cape Colony) and Emmerentia Johanna Steytler. He attended the South African College School in Cape Town and passed matric at the University of the Cape of Good Hope in 1893.

== Career as a chemist ==
At the end of 1896, he started to work as assistant analyst in the Government Analytical Laboratory, Cape Town. In 1912 the Government appoint him as a first-grade chemical assistant in the Government Analytical Laboratory. The South African Railways and Harbours Administration appointed him as chief chemist in 1929. He stayed in that position until his retirement in 1935. He was an analytical chemist by profession.

Rose was a member of various science and chemical organizations or associations, including the South African Association for the Advancement of Science (1903), the British Association for the Advancement of Science (1905), the Royal Society of South Africa (1910), the South African Association of Analytical Chemists (1921) and the Institute of Chemistry of Great Britain and Ireland (1933). He was President of Cape Chemical Society in 1923, and President of the South African Association for the Advancement of Science in 1943.

=== Publications ===
- Rose, J.G. (1910) "A new Cape thermal Chalybeate spring". South African Journal of Science, 7, 202-203.
- Rose, J.G. (1911) "The Insizwa copper nickel deposits". South African Journal of Science, 129-130.
- Rose, J.G. (1929) "Alcohol mixtures as motor fuel in South Africa". South African Journal of Science, 26, 29-38.

== Sport ==
Rose was a keen sportsman. He twice held the world amateur human-paced hour record for cycling in 1898 and 1899, riding 30 miles 606 yards in the hour at the Green Point cycle track. He was captain of the Alfred Rowing Club, winning five championships for six oars in Table Bay.

== Military ==
Rose had a long military career. He served in the South African College Cadet Corps for five years, later becoming the corps commander. In the Anglo-Boer War between 1899 and 1902, he was a captain in the Cape Colonial Cycle Corps, and received the Queen's South Africa Medal. Rose then served as lieutenant in the Duke of Edinburgh's Own Volunteer Rifles. During World War I, he was assigned to the mechanical transport in the German South West Africa project, receiving the Star medal and Croix de Guerre. He obtained the rank of lieutenant-colonel and later became the chief inspector of mechanical transport in East Africa. He also received the Distinguished Service Order (DSO) medal. In World War II Rose was director of transportation of the Union Defence Force.

== Freemasons ==
Succeeding Conrad Silberbauer, Rose was Grand Master of the Freemasons in South Africa from 1944 to 1957. Colonel C.G. Botha took over from him in 1957.

== Death ==
Rose died, aged 97, on 20 February 1973 in Cape Town in a house called Beau Soleil (today the Beau Soleil Music Centre).
