= Biesheuvel =

Biesheuvel is a surname. Notable people with the surname include:

- Barend Biesheuvel (1920–2001), Dutch politician
- Maarten Biesheuvel (1939–2020), Dutch writer
- Simon Biesheuvel (1908–1991), Dutch-born South African psychologist
