= Southern Africa Association for the Advancement of Science =

Scientific society based in South Africa

The Southern Africa Association for the Advancement of Science (S2A3 or S_{2}A_{3}) is a learned society, originally known as the South African Association for the Advancement of Science (SAAAS). Established in 1902, its principal aim is to increase the public awareness and understanding of science, engineering and technology, and their role in society, by means of various awards and by communicating the nature, processes, ethics, and excitement of science. Membership is open to all.

== History ==
The South African Association for the Advancement of Science was founded in 1902 and modelled on the British Association for the Advancement of Science (BA), now known as the British Science Association. One of the most prominent scientists involved in the movement to establish S2A3 was Dr (later Sir) David Gill (1843–1914), director of the Royal Observatory, Cape of Good Hope, who was elected its first president. All scientific disciplines were accommodated, with the result that membership rose to over 1000. For many years S2A3 was the largest and most influential scientific society in southern Africa. Members met once a year in different southern African cities to present papers and tend to the business of the Association. The first annual meeting was held in Cape Town in 1903. Two years later the Association met jointly with the British Science Association in South Africa. A second joint meeting was held in South Africa in 1929. The annual meetings were discontinued in the nineteen-seventies, whereupon the Association's membership declined to its present level of around 100.

== Governing body ==
The Association is governed by a National Council, consisting of a president, regional vice-presidents, secretary, treasurer, and additional council members. The presidents:

- 1902–1903 Sir David Gill (1843–1914)
- 1903–1904 Sir Charles H T Metcalf (1853–1928)
- 1904–1905 Theodore Reunert (1856–1943)
- 1905–1906 Gardner F. Williams (1842–1922)
- 1906–1907 Dr James Hyslop (1856–1917)
- 1907–1908 Sir Walter F Hely-Hutchinson (1849–1913)
- 1908–1909 Sir Hamilton J Goold-Adams (1858–1920)
- 1909–1910 Sir Thomas Muir (1844–1934)
- 1910–1911 Prof Paul D Hahn (1849–1918)
- 1911–1912 Sir Arnold Theiler (1867–1936)
- 1912–1913 Dr Alexander W Roberts (1857–1938)
- 1913–1914 Prof H W Rudolf Marloth (1855–1931)
- 1914–1915 Dr Robert T A Innes (1861–1931)
- 1915–1916 Prof Lawrence Crawford (1867–1951)
- 1916–1917 Prof John Orr (1870–1954)
- 1917–1918 Dr Charles F Juritz (1867–1945)
- 1918–1919 Reverend William Flint (1854–1943)
- 1919–1920 Dr Illtyd B Pole Evans (1879–1968)
- 1920–1921 Prof James E Duerden (1865–1937)
- 1921–1922 Dr Arthur W Rogers (1872–1946)
- 1922–1923 Prof John D F Gilchrist (1866–1926)
- 1923–1924 Prof James A Wilkinson (1874?–1934)
- 1924–1925 General Jan C Smuts (1870–1950)
- 1925–1926 Dr Edward T Mellor (1868–1940)
- 1926–1927 Prof Harold B Fantham (1876–1937)
- 1927–1928 Sir J Carruthers Beattie (1866–1946)
- 1928–1929 Jan F H Hofmeyr (1894–1948)
- 1929–1930 Harry E Wood (1881–1946)
- 1930–1931 Prof John W Bews (1884–1938)
- 1931–1932 Prof Petrus J du Toit (1888–1967)
- 1932–1933 Dr Robert Broom (1866–1951)
- 1933–1934 Dr Alexander L du Toit (1878–1948)
- 1934–1935 Prof Max M Rindl (1883–1947)
- 1935–1936 Lord George H H V Clarendon (1877–1955)
- 1936–1937 Lieutenant-general C Graham Botha (1883–1973)
- 1937–1938 Prof L F Maingard (−1968)
- 1938–1939 Prof George H Stanley (1877–1964)
- 1939–1940 Prof Cornelius G S de Villiers (1894–1978)
- 1940–1941 James Gray (1882–1957)
- 1941–1942 Dr Edwin P Phillips (1882–1967)
- 1942–1943 Dr Adrianus Pijper (1886–1964)
- 1943–1944 Colonel John G Rose (1876–1973)
- 1944–1945 Ernest C Chubb (1884–1972)
- 1945–1946 Dr Frederick E T Krause (1868–1959)
- 1946–1947 Prof Henry H Paine (1883?–1980)
- 1947–1948 Dr Sidney H Skaife (1889–1976)
- 1948–1949 Dr Gilles v d W de Kock (1889–1973)
- 1949–1950 Prof Clarence van Riet Lowe (1894–1956)
- 1950–1951 Prof Ernst G Malherbe (1895–)
- 1951–1952 Dr Basil F J Schonland (1896–1972)
- 1952–1953 Prof Raymond A Dart (1893–1988)
- 1953–1954 Prof Percival R Kirby (1887–1970)
- 1954–1955 Dr Thomas B Davie (1895–1955)
- 1955–1956 DrS Meiring Naude (1904–1985)
- 1956–1957 Prof Robert H Compton (1886–1979)
- 1957–1958 Prof Arthur E H Bleksley (1908–1984)
- 1958–1959 Dr Ronald Elsdon-Dew (1909–1984)
- 1959–1960 Dr Bernard Smit (–)
- 1960–1961 Dr Robert A Dyer (1900–1987)
- 1961–1962 Dr Jacobus P Duminy (1897–1980)
- 1962–1963 Dr Simon Biesheuvel (1908–1991)
- 1963–1964 Prof Govert van Drimmelen (1911–)
- 1964–1965 Dr Raimund H Marloth (1904–)
- 1965–1966 Dr Abraham C Hoffman (1903–1969)
- 1966–1967 Prof Cornelius A du Toit (1910–)
- 1967–1968 John L M Lintner (1907–)
- 1968–1969 Prof John F V Phillips (1899–1987)
- 1969–1970 Prof Ian D Macrone (1898–1981)
- 1970–1971 Prof Adolf J W Bayer (1900–1978)
- 1971–1972 Prof Guerino R Bozzoli (1911–1998)
- 1972–1973 Prof Sidney H Haughton (1888–1982)
- 1973–1974 Dr James M Hyslop (1908–1984)
- 1975–1976 Prof Otto Wipplinger (1914–)
- 1977–1978 L S Richfield (–)
- 1979–1980 Prof Daniel M Joubert (1928–1994)
- 1981–1982 Mr Denys G Kingwill (1917–1997)
- 1983–1984 Prof R D Griesel (1936–)
- 1985–1986 Dr Gordon K Nelson (1928–1996)
- 1987 Brigadier G N Robertson (–)
- 1988–1990 Prof Eric Holm (1945–)
- 1990–1991 Prof Paul Smit (1932–)
- 1991–1996 Prof Johan Wolfaardt (1939–)
- 1996–2002 Dr Ian Raper (1945–)

== Branches ==
The Pretoria Branch of the Association arranges monthly public lectures on scientific subjects.

== Awards ==
- The South Africa Medal (gold), originally funded by a grant from the British Science Association in 1905, is awarded annually to recognise exceptional contributions to the advancement of science on a broad front or in a specific field, by an eminent South African scientist. The first recipient, in 1908, was the eminent veterinary scientist Sir Arnold Theiler (1867–1936), for his work on trypanosomes and African horse sickness.
- The British Association Medal (silver), originally funded by a grant from the British Science Association in 1929, is awarded annually to a South African scientist under the age of 40 who is actively engaged in research and has, by way of international participation and publications, shown outstanding capability and achievements. The first recipient, in 1932, was Miss Nellie F. Paterson, junior lecturer in zoology at the University of the Witwatersrand.
- The S2A3 Masters Medals (bronze) serve to commend outstanding South African science research students graduating at the Masters level. These medals are awarded annually to one candidate selected by each South African university.
- Merit Certificates are occasionally awarded to persons who have contributed, each in their own way, to either the advancement of science or the Association's activities.

== Publications ==
The Association annually publishes the Rudolf Marloth Brochure, named after the former president Rudolf Marloth. It contains information about the recipients of the annual awards, summaries of their lectures, and other information relating to the Association's activities. A special centenary edition was published in 2002.
