= M. L. Fick =

South African psychologist (1898–1945)

- Born: Martin Laurence Fick; 30 November 1898
- Died: 2 August 1945 (aged 46)
- Other names: M. Laurence Fick
- Education: University of the Cape of Good Hope; Harvard University
- Known for: Intelligence testing of South African children
- Scientific career
- Fields: Psychology

Martin Laurence Fick (30 November 1898 – 2 August 1945) was a South African psychologist and psychometrician. He is noted for his work administering intelligence tests to South African children. On the basis of this research, he concluded that native South African children were intellectually inferior to their European counterparts, in support of the South African government's policy at the time of not investing in native children's education.

Fick graduated from the University of the Cape of Good Hope with a B. A. degree in 1917 and received his Ed. M. degree from Harvard University in 1922. In 1926, Fick published the Official Mental Hygiene Individual Scale (also known as the "Fick Scale"), which was the first South African intelligence test. Fick worked for the National Bureau of Educational and Social Research, and was noted for his hereditarian interpretation of racial differences in intelligence test scores. This interpretation was criticized by other psychologists such as Simon Biesheuvel. Fick was also a captain in the South African Medical Corps, and he died in 1945 while serving on active duty.
