= Spurrell's free-tailed bat =

Conservation status
- Least Concern (IUCN 3.1)

Scientific classification
- Kingdom: Animalia
- Phylum: Chordata
- Class: Mammalia
- Order: Chiroptera
- Family: Molossidae
- Genus: Mops
- Species: M. spurrelli

Binomial name
- Mops spurrelli Dollman, 1911

Synonyms
- Xiphonycteris spurrelli Dollman, 1911; Tadarida spurrelli Dollman, 1911

Species of bat

Spurrell's free-tailed bat (Mops spurrelli) is a species of bat in the family Molossidae named after Herbert George Flaxman Spurrell. It is found in Central and West Africa. Its natural habitats are subtropical or tropical dry forest and subtropical or tropical moist lowland forest.

== Taxonomy and etymology ==
It was described as a new species in 1911 by British zoologist Guy Dollman. Dollman initially placed it in the now-defunct genus Xiphonycteris. The eponym for the species name "spurrelli" is Herbert George Flaxman Spurrell, who collected the holotype. The holotype, an adult male, was collected 60 mi (97 km) west of Kumasi, Ghana at an altitude of 700 ft (210 m).

== Description ==
Spurrell's free-tailed bat is a small species, with a forearm length of approximately 27 mm (1.1 in). Its fur is a rusty red color on its back, with its ventral surface a buffy white. Its dental formula is 1.1.2.31.1.2.3 for a total of 28 teeth. It has triangular ears, small feet, and hairy toes.

== Range and habitat ==
Its range includes several countries; it has been documented in Cameroon, Central African Republic, The Democratic Republic of the Congo, Ivory Coast, Equatorial Guinea, Ghana, Guinea, Liberia, Sierra Leone, and Togo

== Conservation ==
As of 2017, it is evaluated as a least-concern species by the IUCN.
