= Rosie Trevelyan =

British biologist

Rosie Trevelyan MBE
- Education: Oxford University
- Awards: Silver Medal (Zoological Society of London)
- Scientific career
- Fields: Zoology
- Workplaces: Tropical Biology Association; Cambridge Conservation Forum

Rosie Trevelyan MBE is a British biologist, and director of the Cambridge office of the Tropical Biology Association. She won the 2008 Silver Medal of the Zoological Society of London.

== Life ==
She earned a BA and DPhil. from Oxford University. She was co-founder of the Cambridge Conservation Forum. She lectures in the Department of Zoology, University of Cambridge.

Trevelyan was appointed Member of the Order of the British Empire (MBE) in the 2024 New Year Honours for services to Environmental Science and International Conservation.
