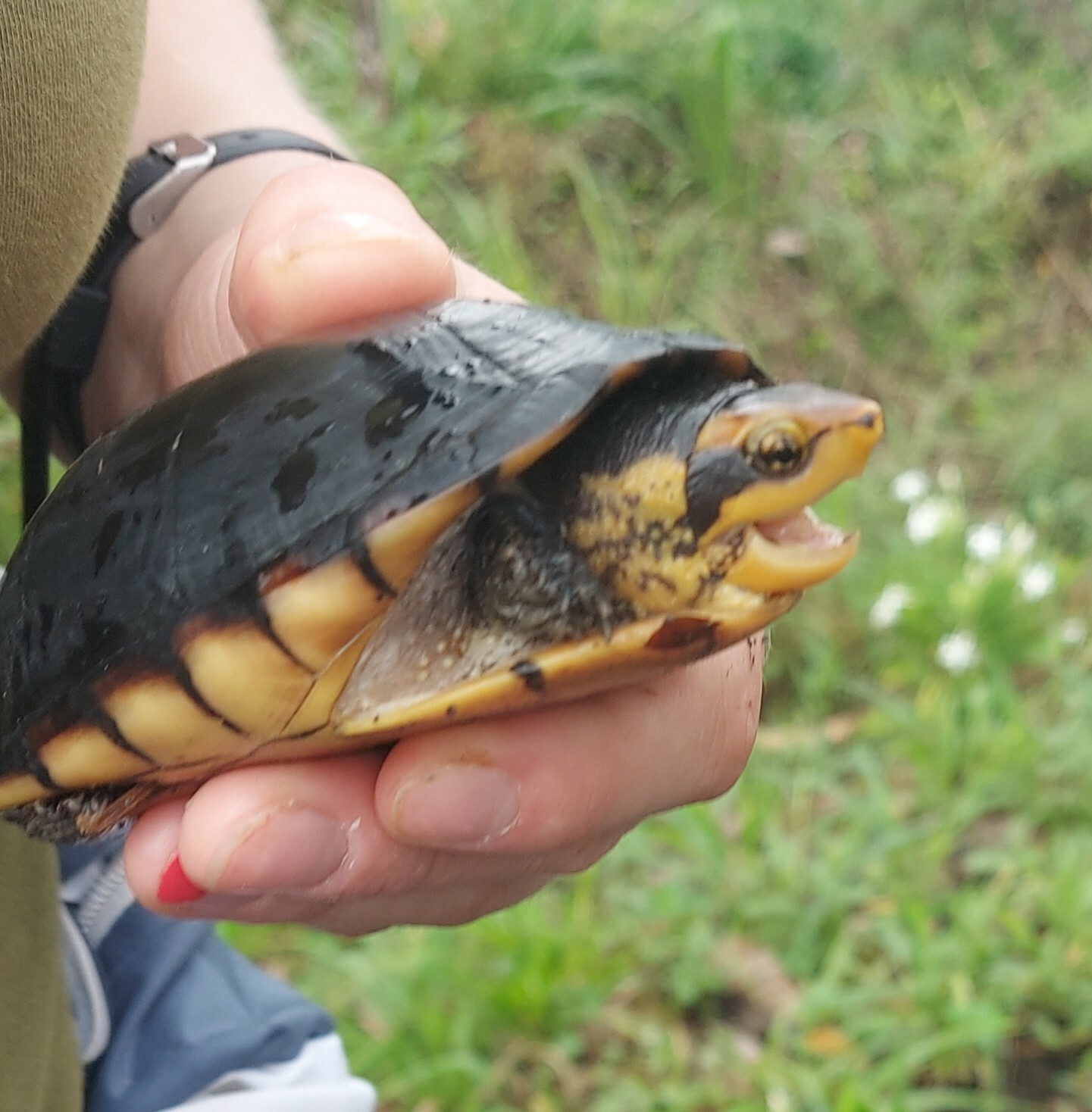
- In Costa Rica
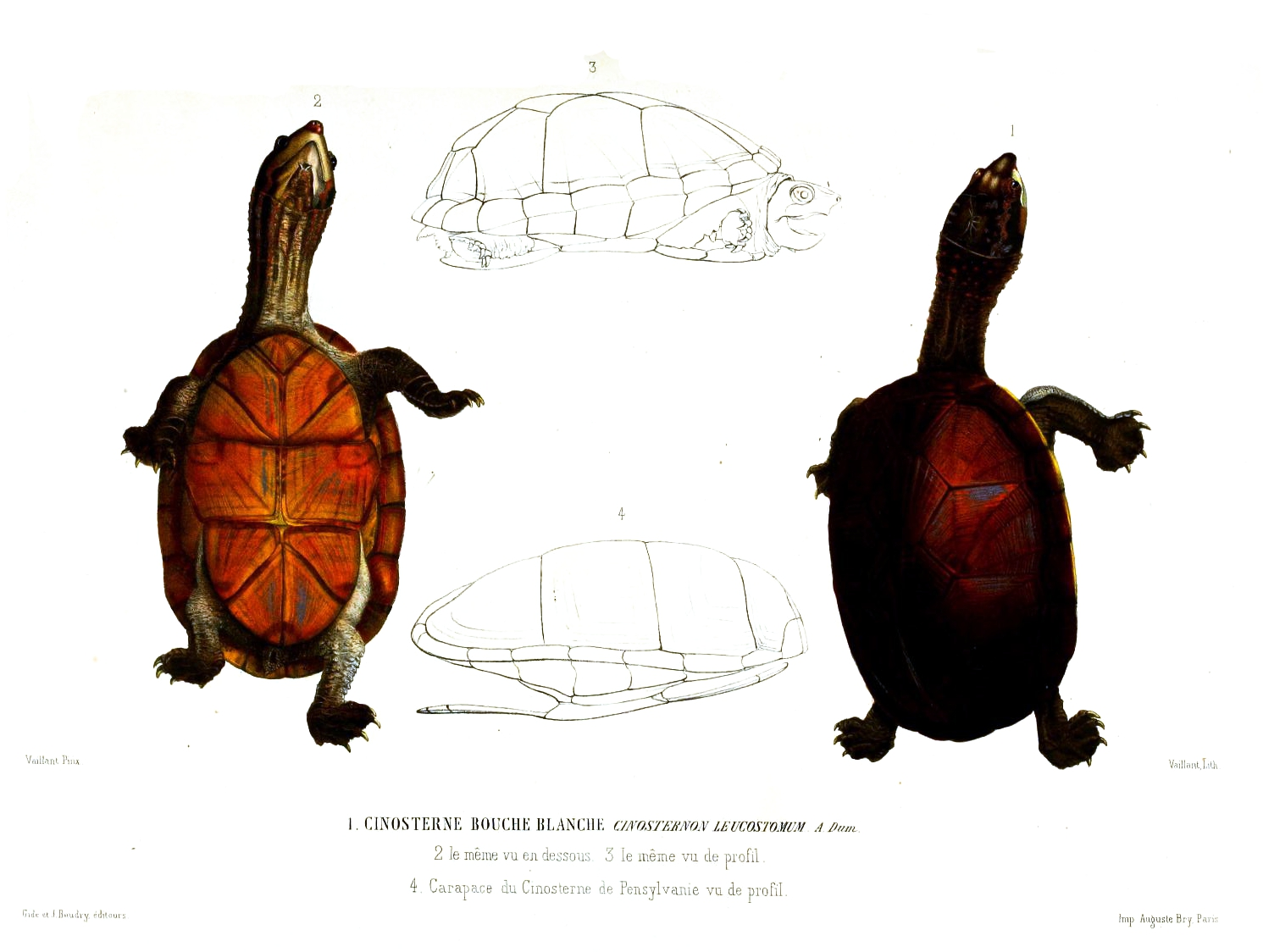
- 1852 illustration

Scientific classification
- Kingdom: Animalia
- Phylum: Chordata
- Class: Reptilia
- Order: Testudines
- Suborder: Cryptodira
- Family: Kinosternidae
- Genus: Kinosternon
- Species: K. leucostomum

Binomial name
- Kinosternon leucostomum (A.M.C. Duméril & Bibron, 1851)

Synonyms
- Kinosternon leucostomum leucostomum: Cinosternon leucostomum A.M.C. Duméril & Bibron, 1851; Kinosternum leucostomum — LeConte, 1854; Kinosternon leucostomum — Gray, 1856; Cinosternum leucostomum — Agassiz, 1857; Thyrosternum leucostomum — Agassiz, 1857; Swanka maculata Gray, 1869; Swanka leucostoma — Gray, 1870; Cinosternum brevigulare Günter, 1885; Cinosternum cobanum Günter, 1885; Cinosternon cobanum — Atkinson, 1907; Kinsternon leucostomum — Stuart, 1934; Kinosternon mopanum Neill, 1965; Kinosternon leucostoma — Tryon, 1975; Kinosternon leucostomum leucostomum — Berry, 1979; Kinosternon leucostomum postinguinale: Cinosternum brevigulare Cope, 1885; Cinosternum postinguinale Cope, 1887 (nomen novum); Cinosternon brevigulare — Atkinson, 1907; Cinosternum spurrelli Boulenger, 1913; Kinosternon postinguinale — Schmidt, 1946; Kinosternon spurelli [sic] Schmidt, 1946 (ex errore); Kinosternon spurrelli — Mertens & Wermuth, 1955; Kinosternon postinguinal [sic] Legler, 1965 (ex errore); Kinosternon leucostomum spurrelli — Pritchard, 1979; Kinosternon leucostomum postinguinale — Berry, 1979; Kinosternon leucostomum spurelli — Rudloff, 1990; Kinosternon leucostomum postinguinde [sic] Nöllert, 1992 (ex errore)

= White-lipped mud turtle =

Species of turtle

The white-lipped mud turtle (Kinosternon leucostomum) is a species of mud turtle in the family Kinosternidae. The species is endemic to Central America and northwestern South America.

== Etymology ==
The synonym, Cinosternon spurrelli Boulenger, 1913, which is a synonym of Kinosternon leucostomum postinguinale, was named in honor of British zoologist Herbert George Flaxman Spurrell.

== Geographic range ==
Kinosternon leucostomum is found in Mexico, Belize, Costa Rica, Guatemala, Honduras, Nicaragua, Panama, Colombia, Ecuador, and Peru.

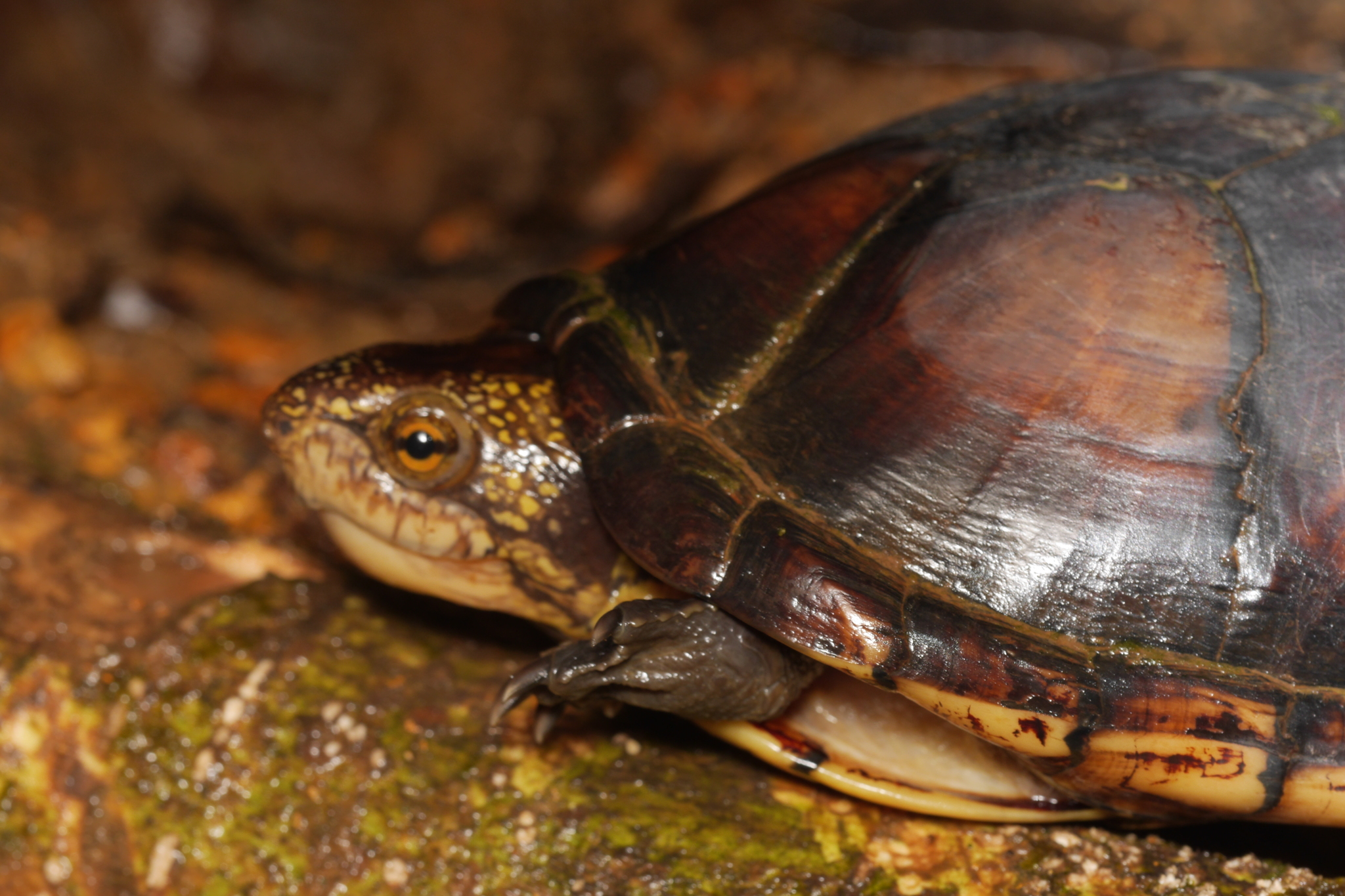
In Ecuador

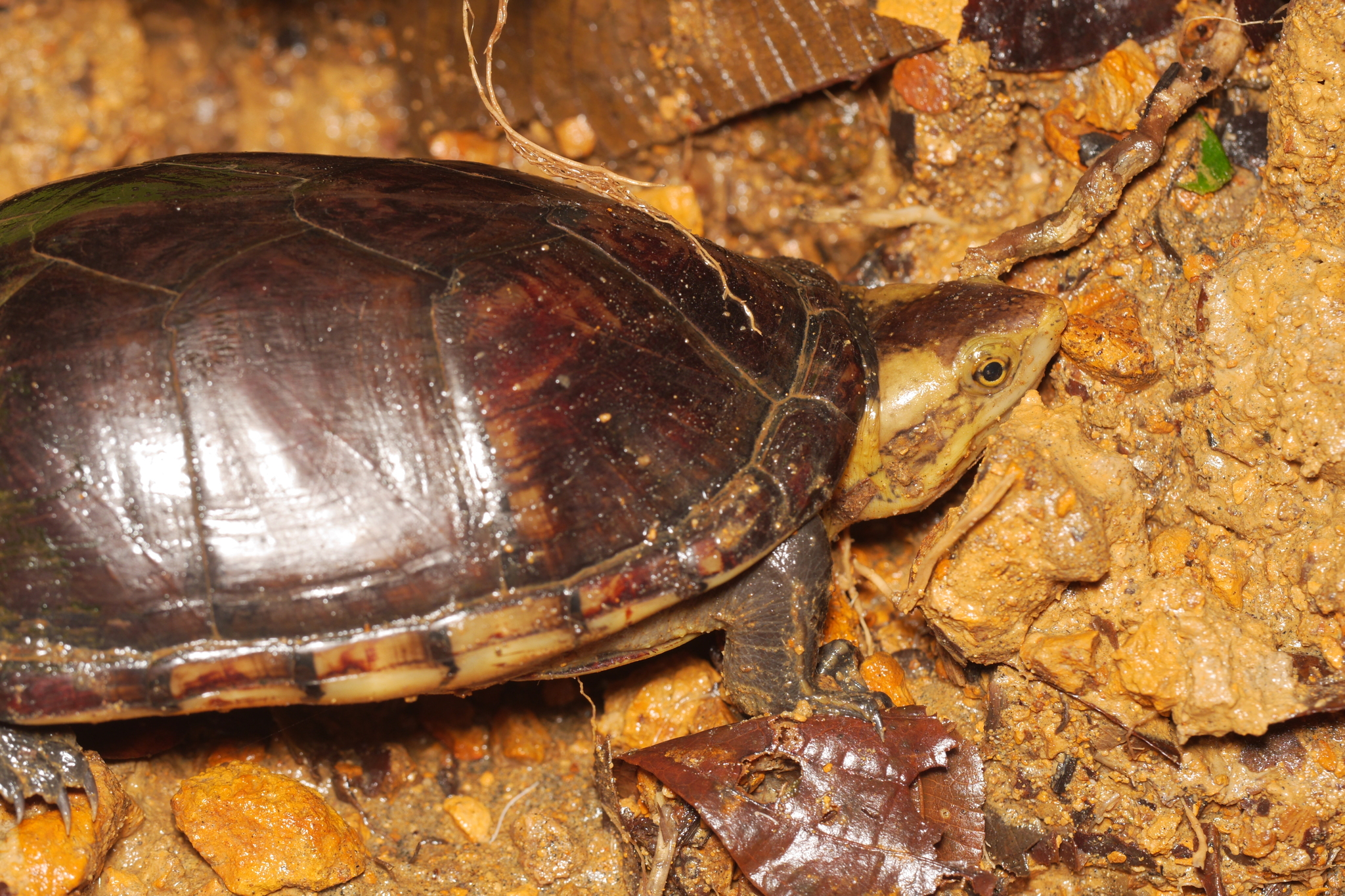
In Ecuador

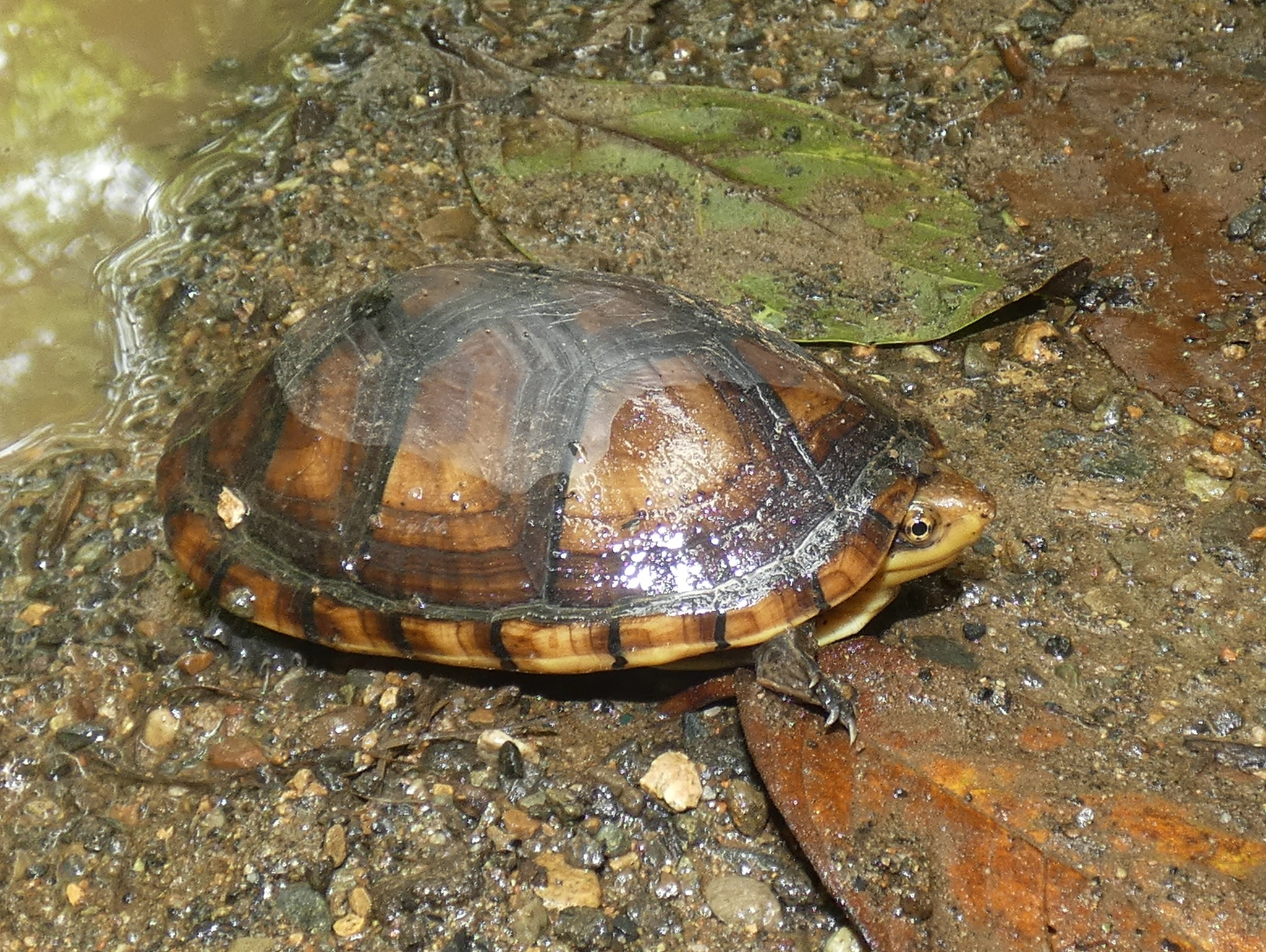
In Panama

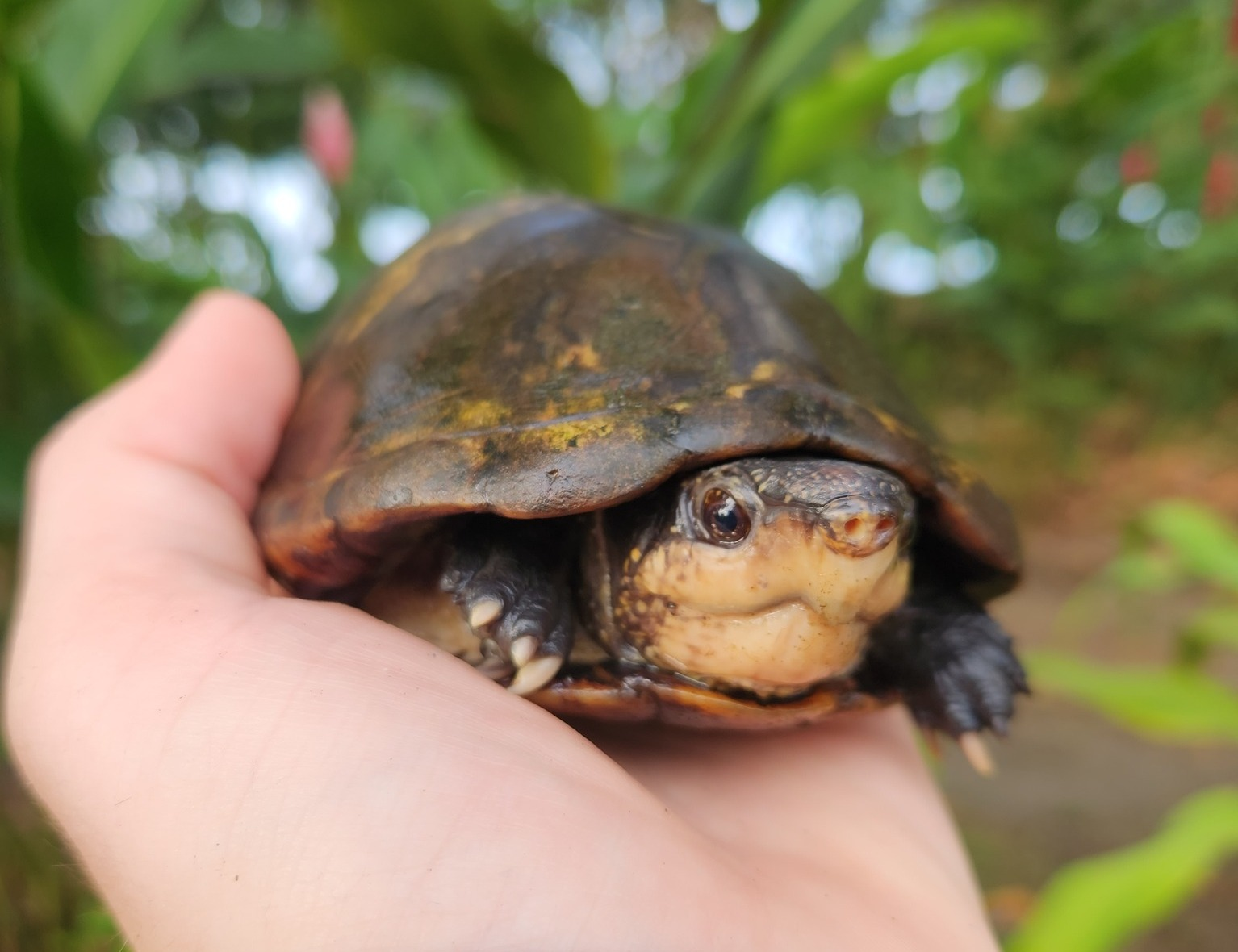
In Costa Rica

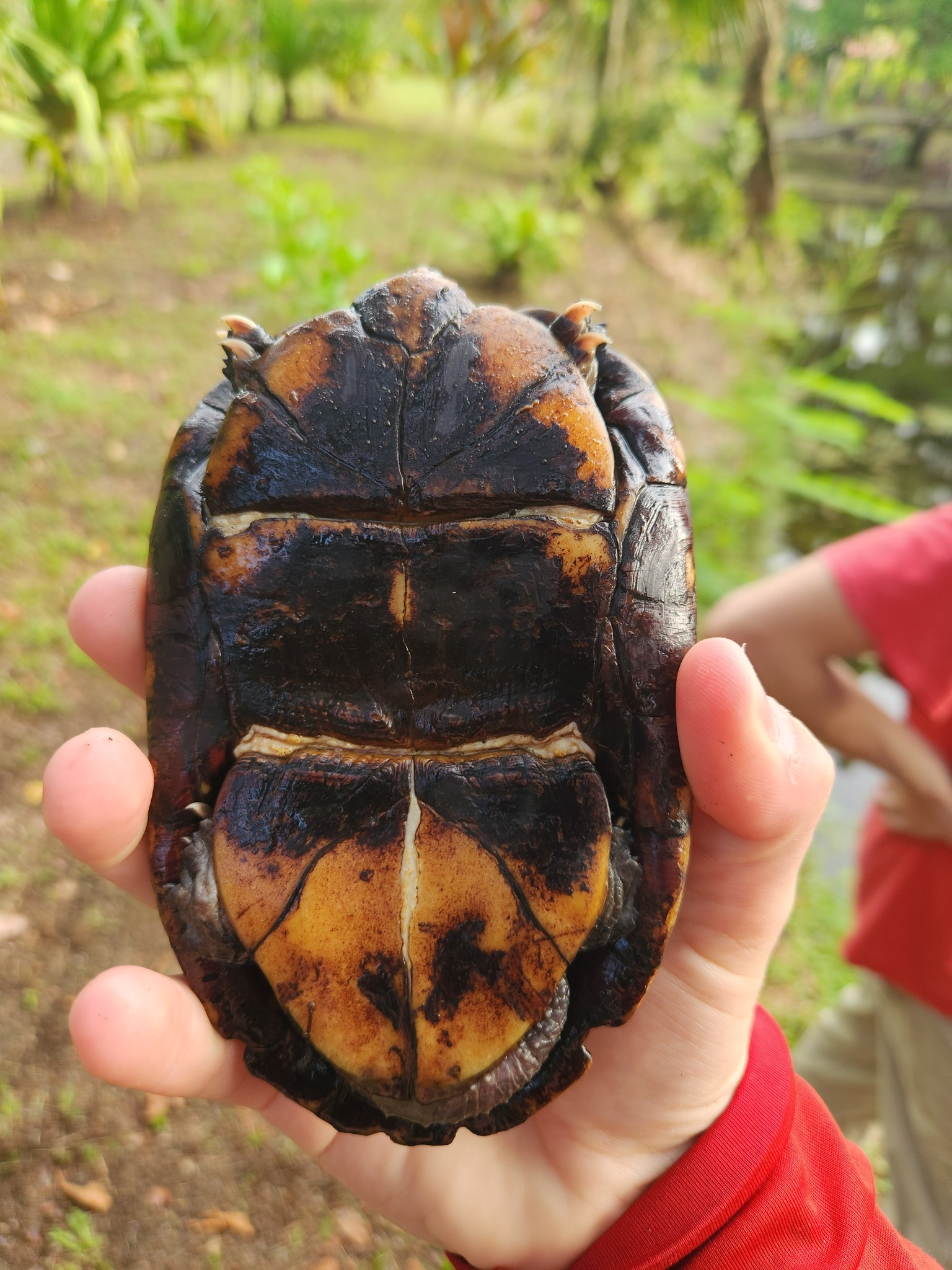
Plastron, in Costa Rica

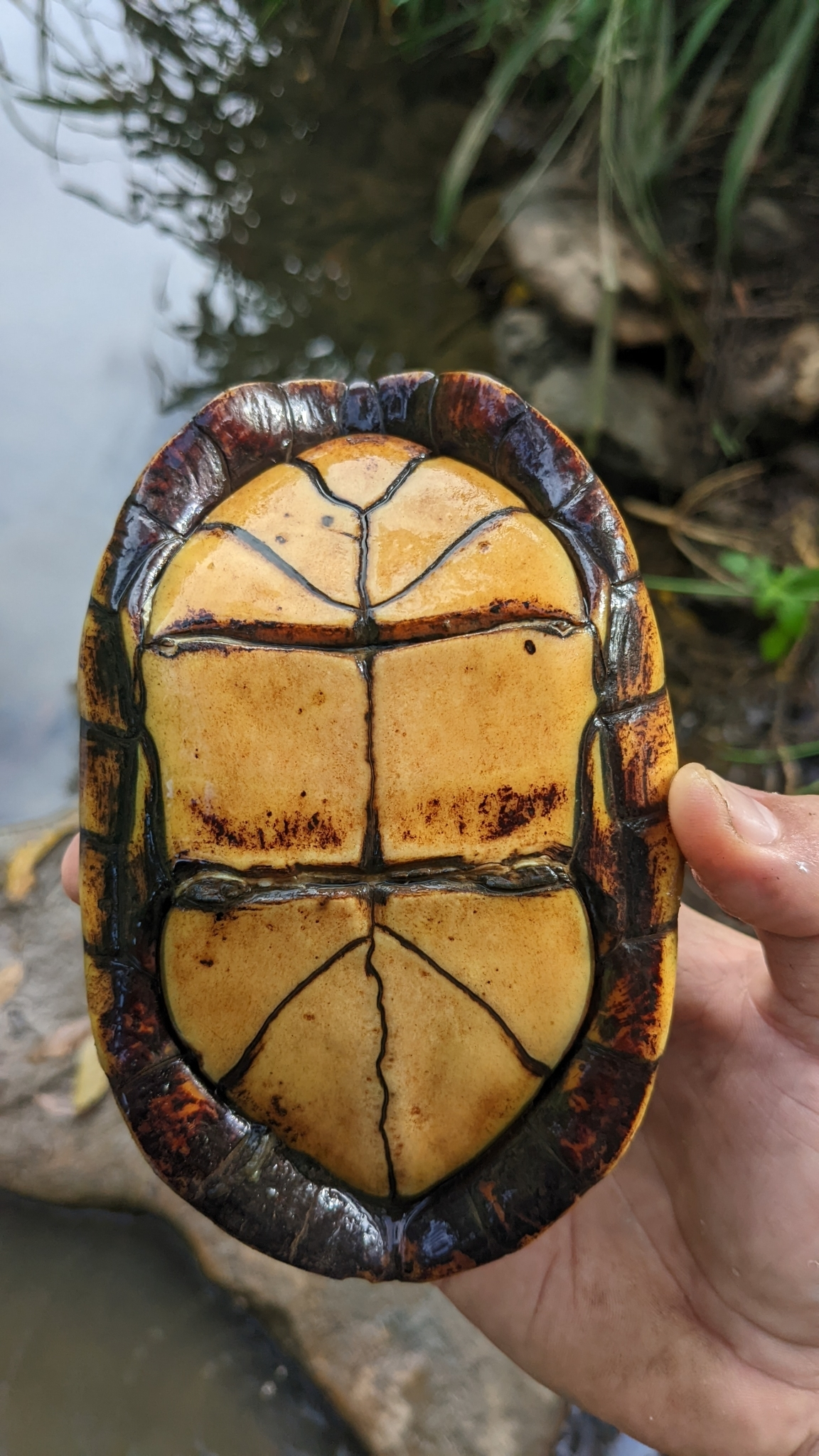
Plastron, in Belize

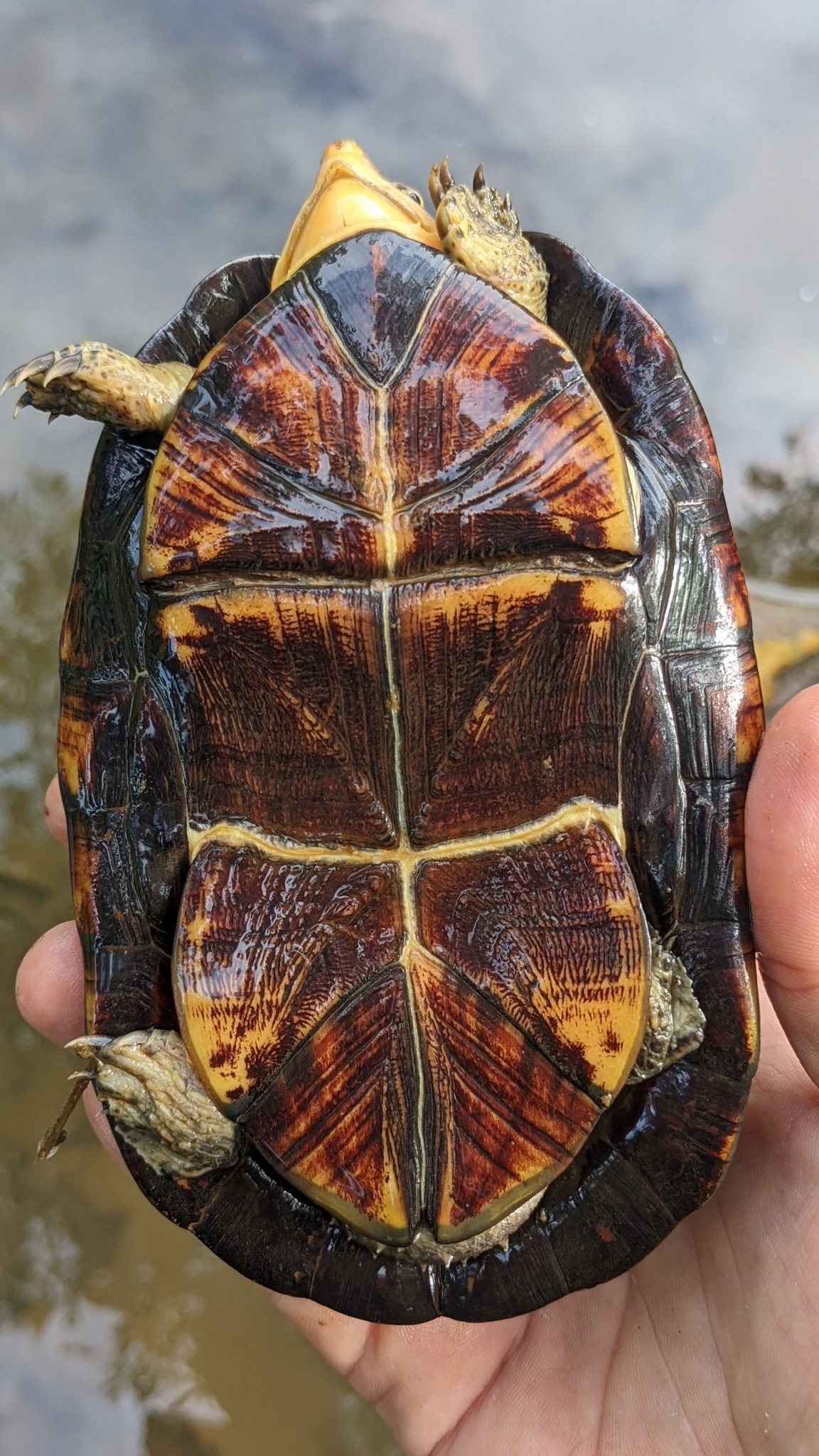
Plastron, in Belize

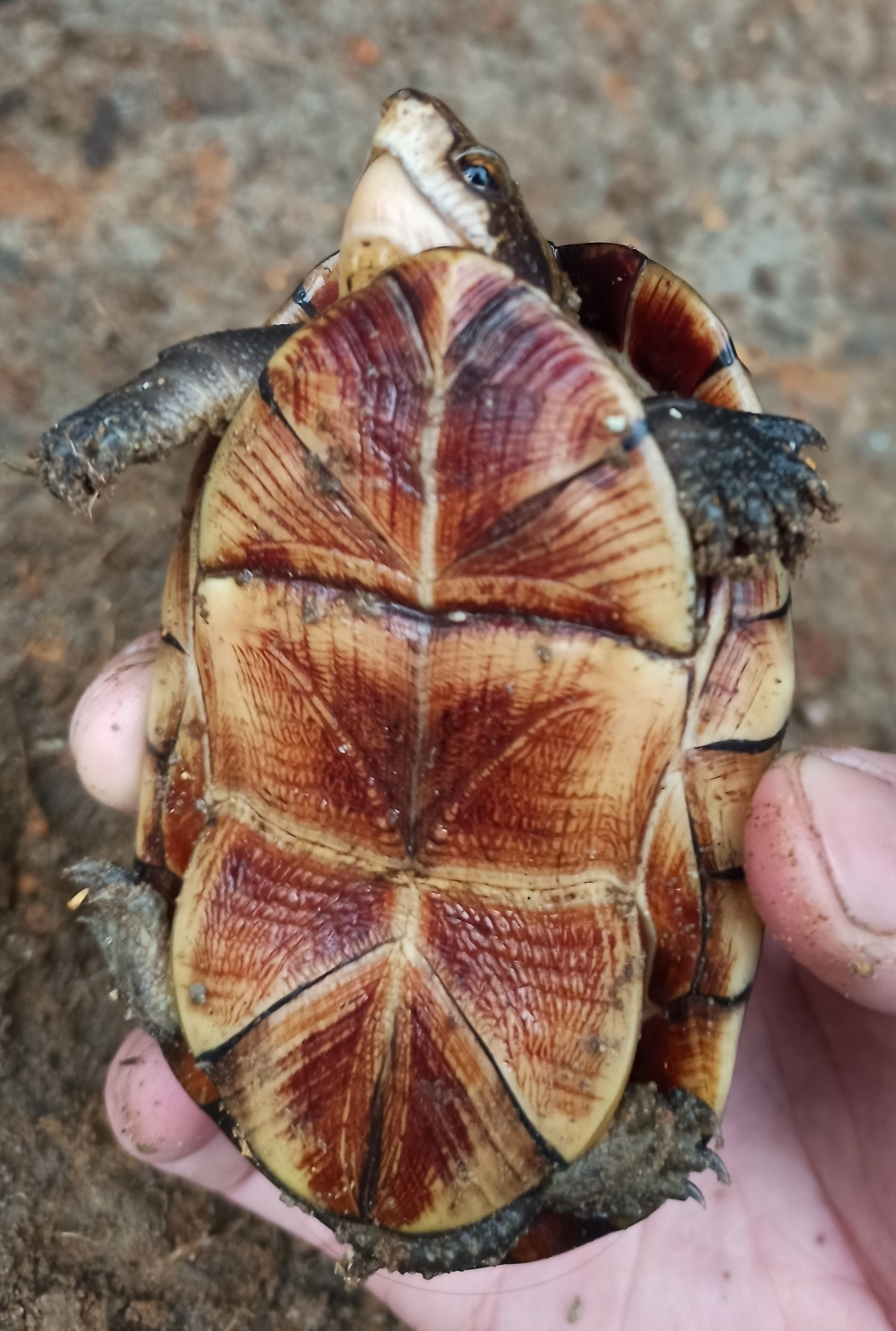
Plastron, in Ecuador

== Subspecies ==
- Northern white-lipped mud turtle – K. l. leucostomum (A.M.C. Duméril & Bibron, 1851)
- Southern white-lipped mud turtle – K. l. postinguinale (Cope, 1887)

Nota bene: A trinomial authority in parentheses indicates that the subspecies was originally described in a genus other than Kinosternon.

K. l. postinguinale in Colombia

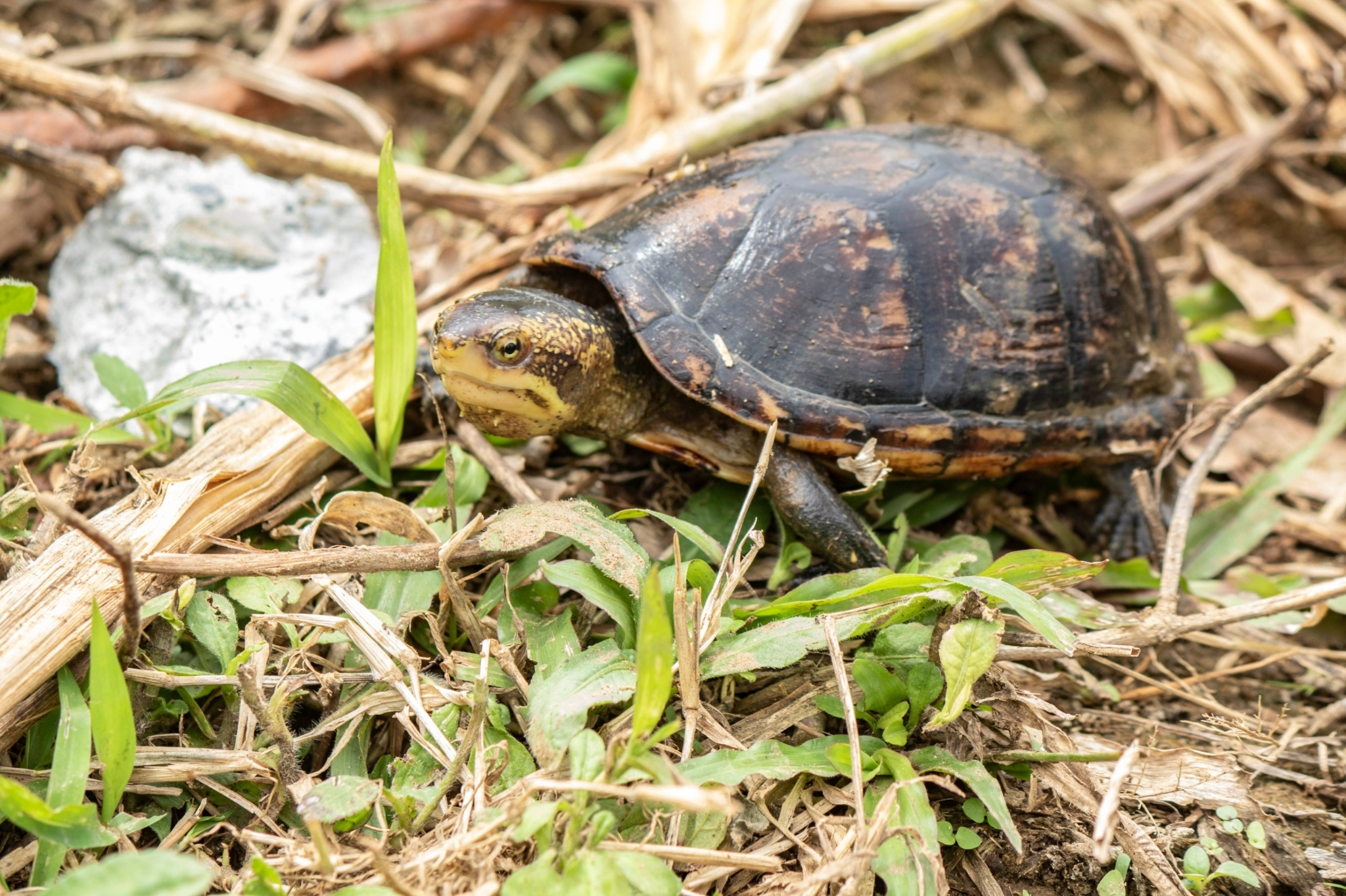

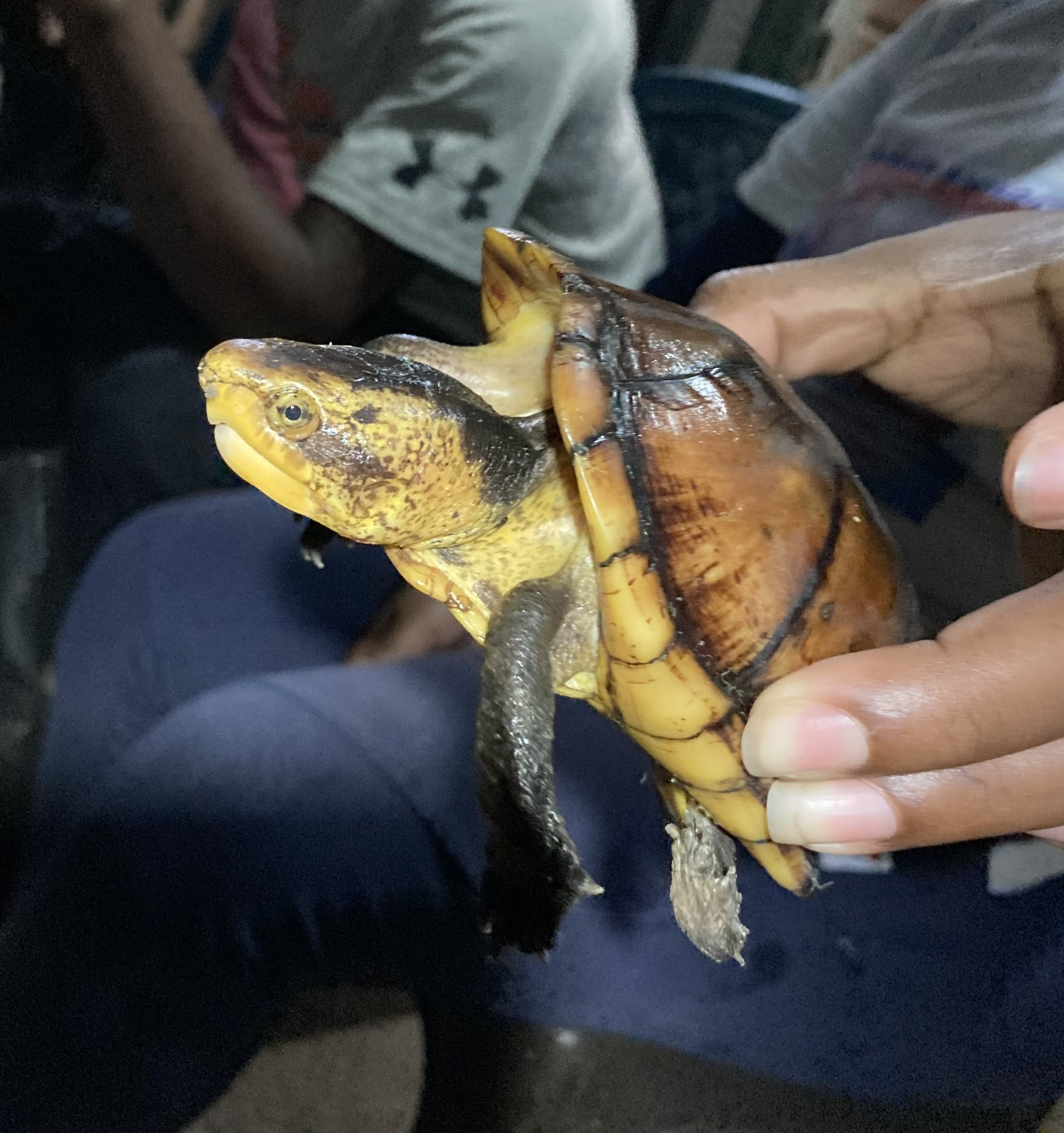

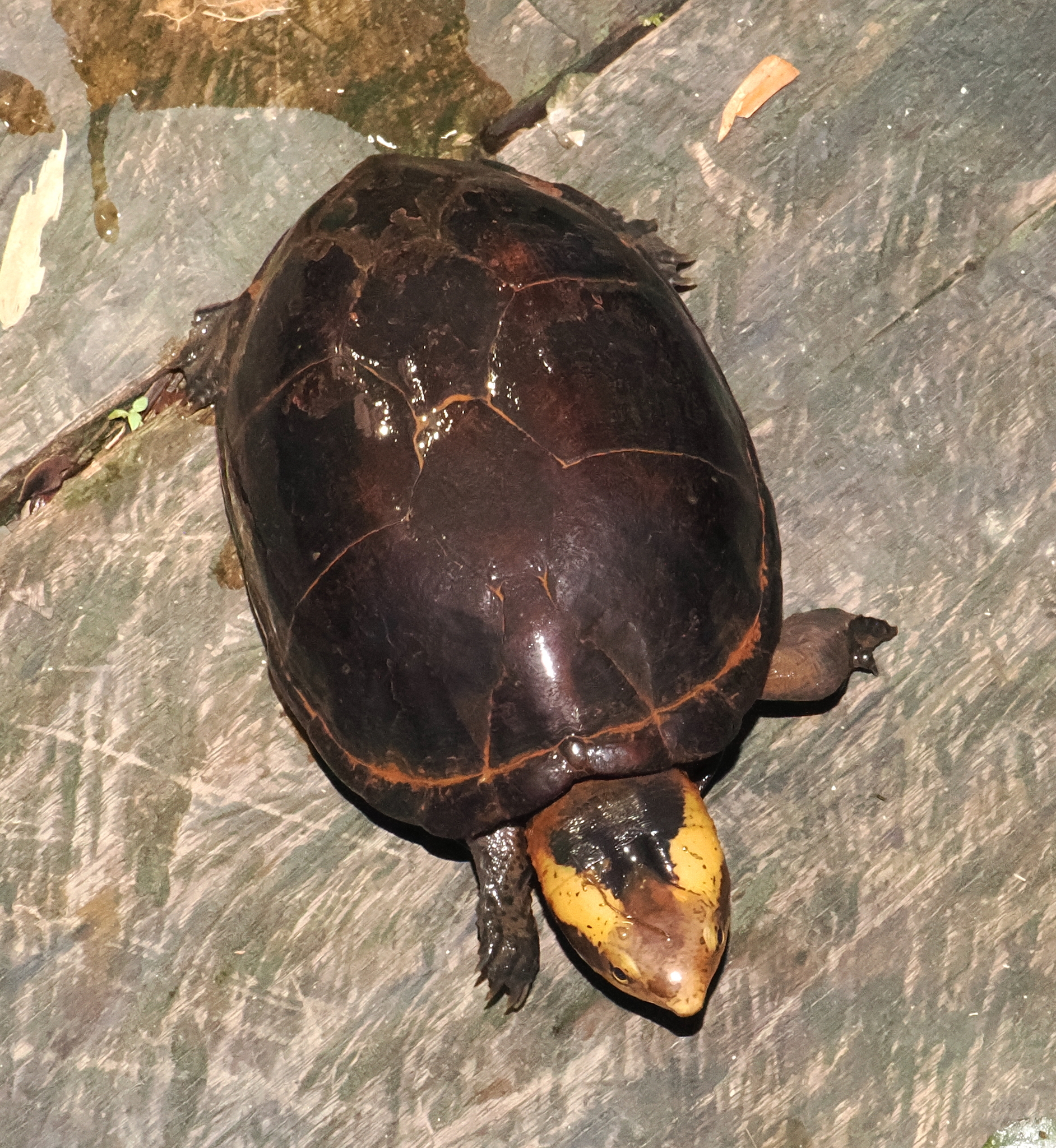

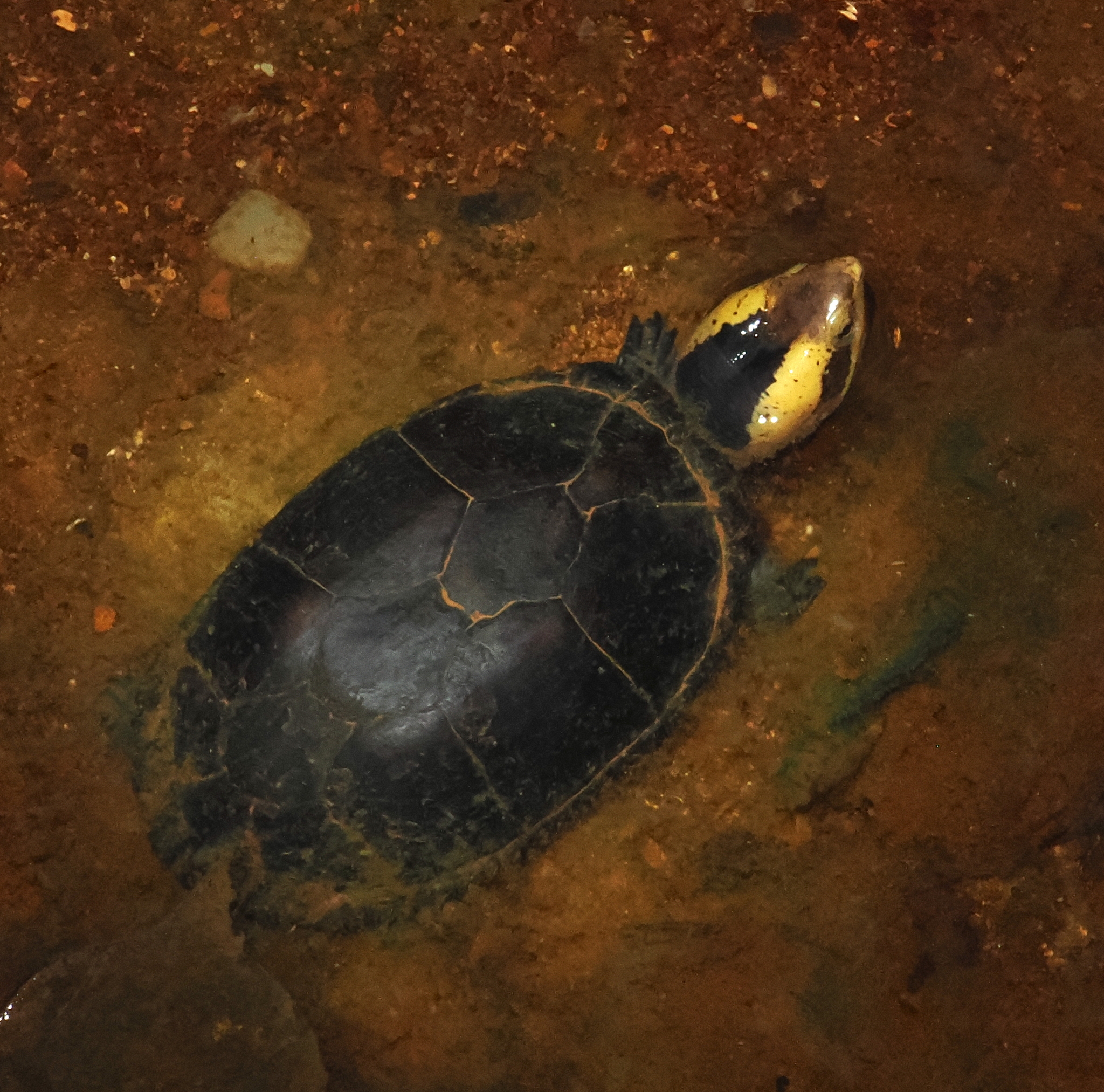

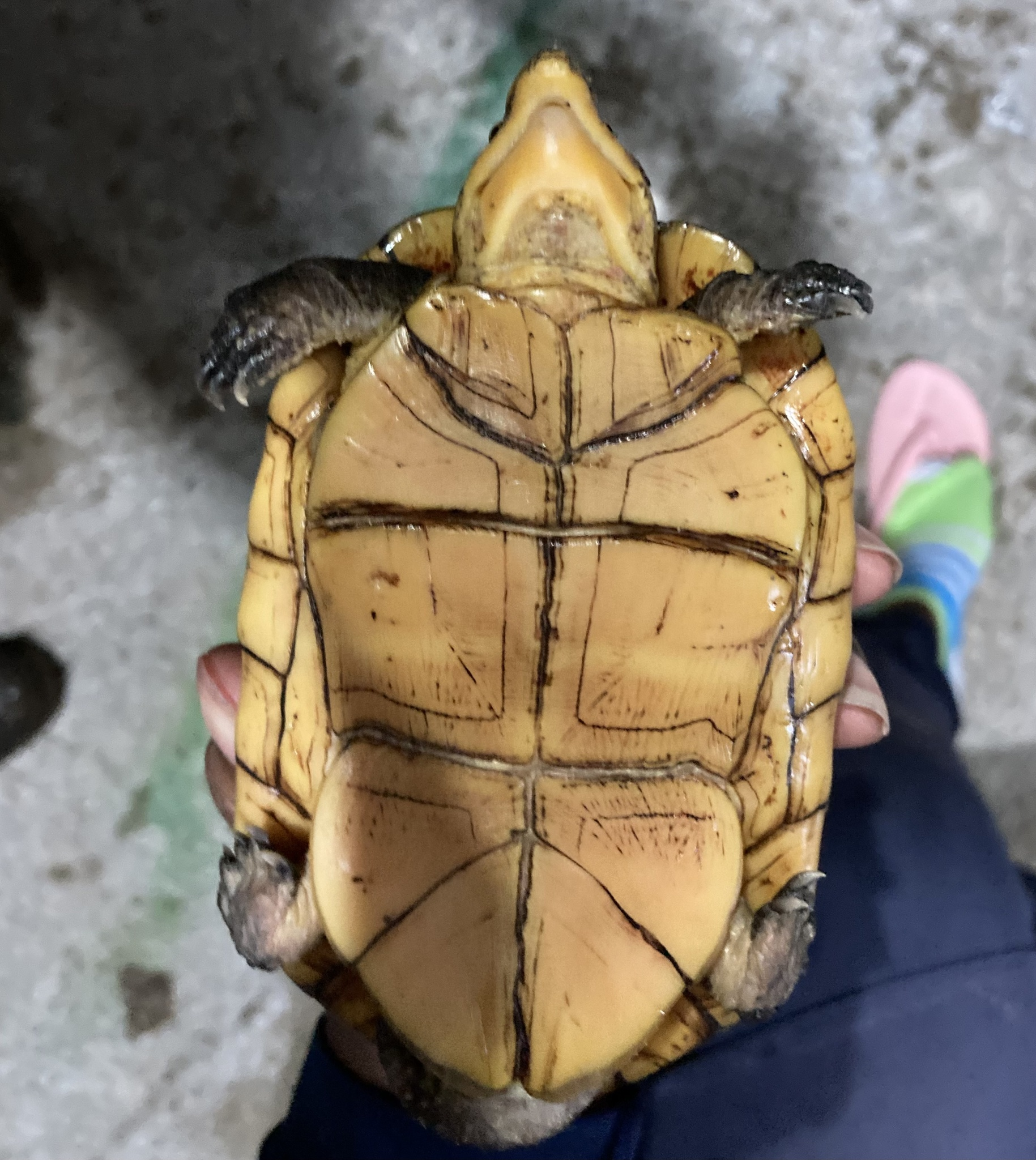

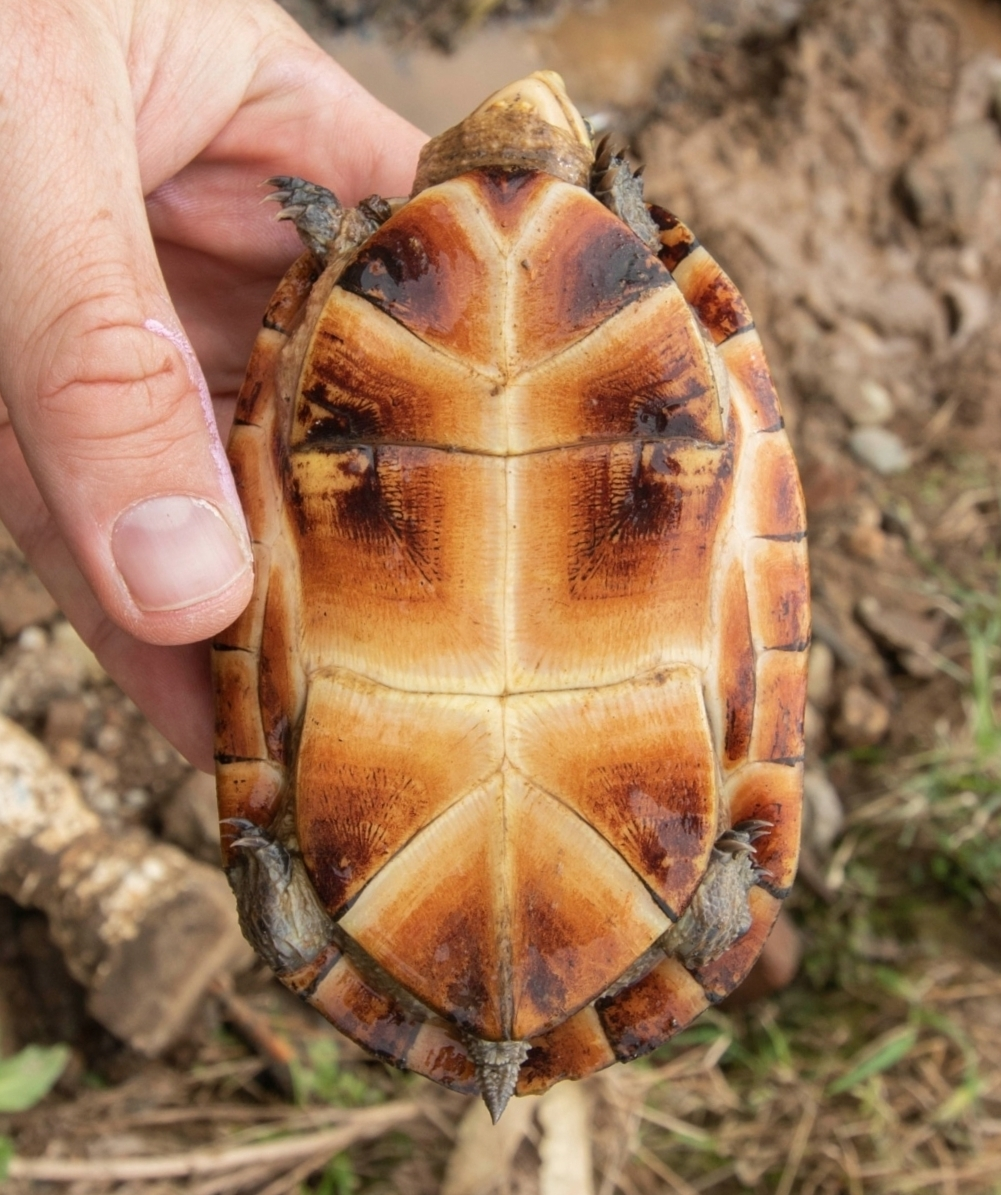
