= Green Point Athletics Stadium =

Former sports stadium in Cape Town, South Africa

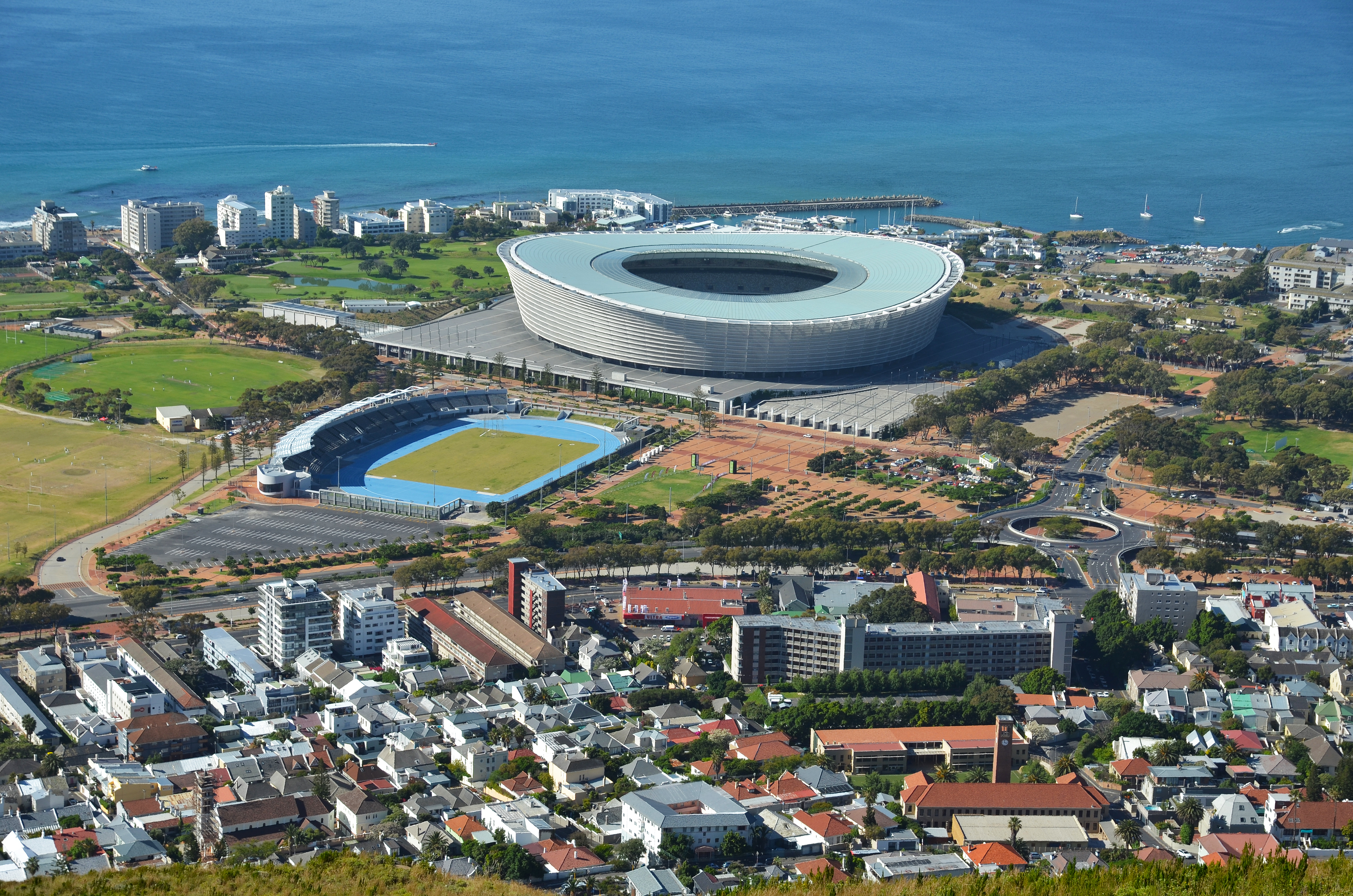
- Green Point Athletics Stadium and Cape Town Stadium
- Interactive map of Green Point Athletics Stadium
- Former names: Green Point Stadium
- Address: Cape Town; South Africa
- Coordinates: 33°54′19.56″S 18°24′31.22″E
- Capacity: –2007: 18,000; 2007– :7,000

Construction
- Renovated: 2007

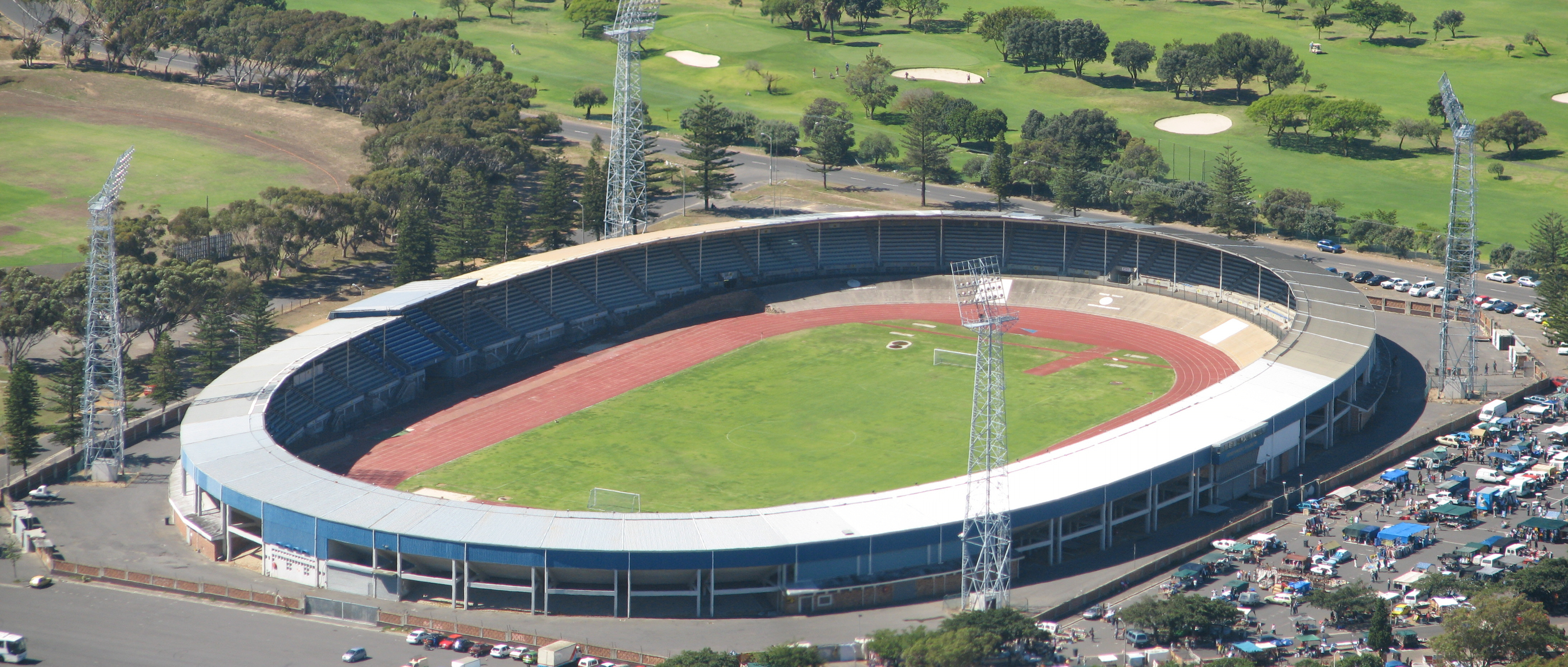
Aerial view of the old Green Point Stadium, before being converted into the Green Point Athletics Stadium in 2007.

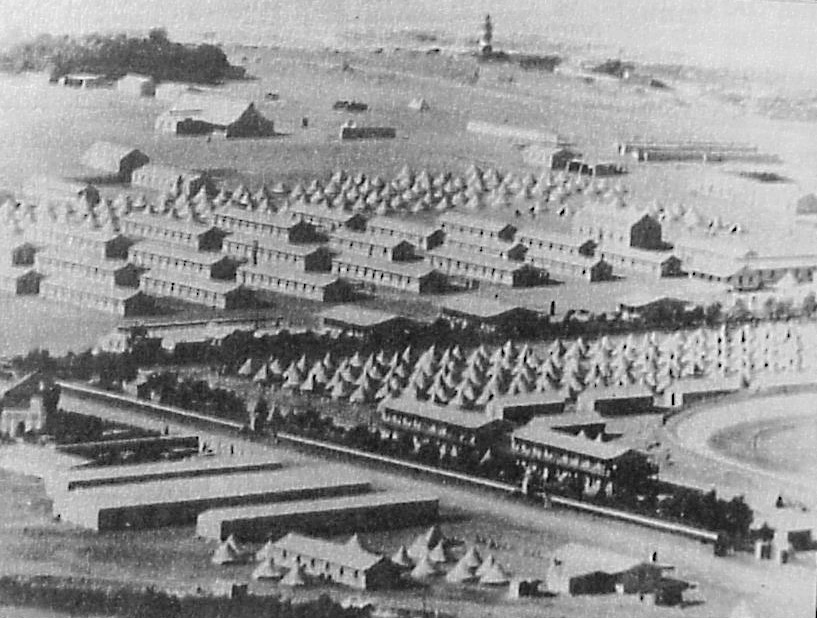
The beginnings of the old Green Point Stadium during the Second Boer War. The old Mouille Point Lighthouse is visible in the background.

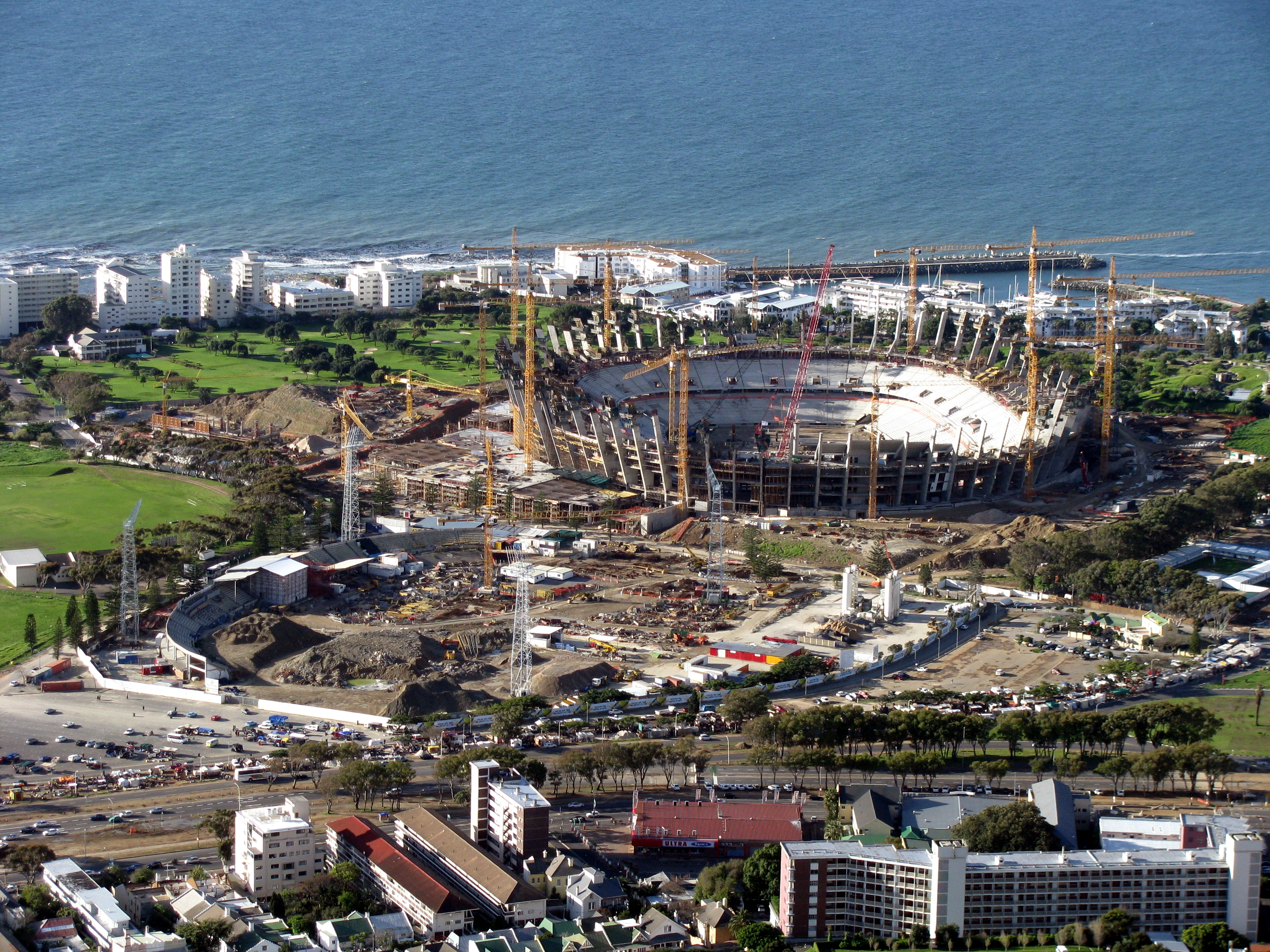
Partial demolition of the Green Point Stadium (foreground) during construction of the adjacent new Cape Town Stadium (background)

The Green Point Athletics Stadium (known as the Green Point Stadium) in Cape Town, South Africa was a multi-purpose sports stadium. Opened in 1897, it had a concrete banked cycle track, also occasionally used for motorsport, with a lap distance of a third of a mile - 586.6 yards (536.4 m) - and inside the cycle track was an athletics track. When it first opened it had seating for 1,000 people, and could accommodate 3,000 standing spectators. Prior to its demolition in 2007, it had 18,000 seats.

Jack Rose twice held the world amateur human-paced hour record for cycling in 1898 and 1899, on the latter occasion riding 30 miles 606 yards in the hour at Green Point.

The stadium was also used for cricket matches and for football, and was the home ground of Santos Football Club and Ajax Cape Town at different points.

It also hosted music events including concerts by Janet Jackson, Gloria Estefan, Michael Jackson, Roxette, Whitney Houston, Def Leppard, Bon Jovi, U2, Metallica, Paul Simon, Robbie Williams, and the Coca-Cola Colab Massive Mix. It hosted the 2003 46664 Concert for the benefit of AIDS victims.

It was also used by local schools such as CBC, Ellerton, de Kuilen and Sea Point High School to host their annual inter-school athletics competitions.

It was partly demolished in 2007 during construction of an adjacent new stadium, the Cape Town Stadium, built on part of an existing golf course for the 2010 FIFA World Cup. The main stand of the rebuilt Green Point Athletics Stadium was constructed on the site of the old stadium's main stand. The athletics stadium was completed in early 2013, and can seat 7,000 people.
