= Helen Roy =

British ecologist and entomologist

Professor Helen Roy MBE FRES
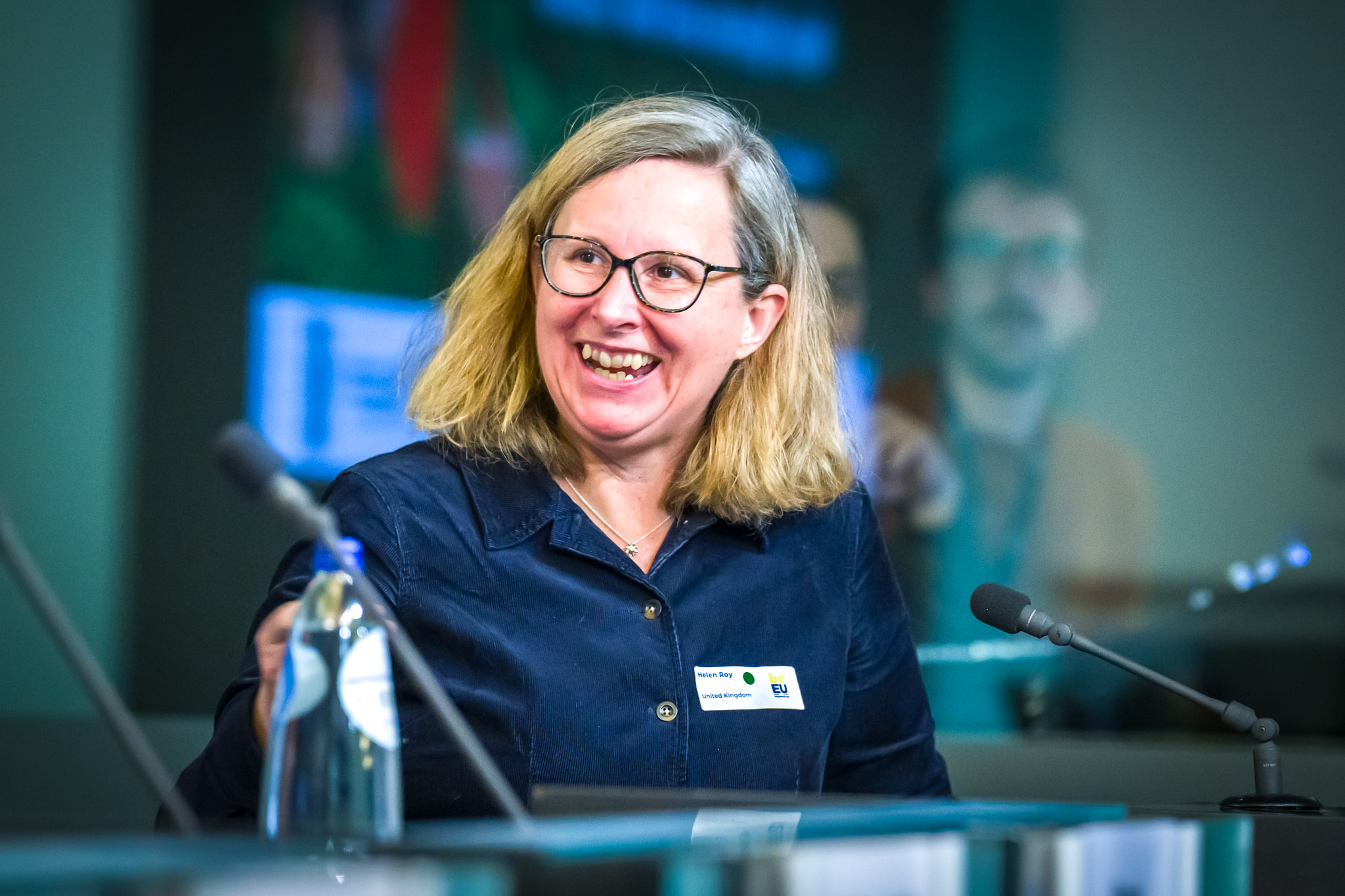
- Helen Roy in 2024.
- Born: 6 November 1969 (age 56); Plymouth, England
- Citizenship: United Kingdom
- Education: University of Southampton; University of Nottingham
- Scientific career
- Fields: Ecology; entomology; aphids; non-native species; science communication
- Workplaces: Anglia Ruskin University; NERC's Centre for Ecology & Hydrology
- Thesis: Interactions between aphid predators and the entomopathogenic fungus Erynia neoaphidis (1997)

Helen Elizabeth Roy, MBE, FRES (born 6 November 1969) is a British ecologist, entomologist, and academic, specialising in ladybirds and non-native species. Since 2007, she has been a principal scientist and ecologist at the NERC's Centre for Ecology & Hydrology. From 1997 to 2008, she taught at Anglia Ruskin University, rising to the rank of Reader in Ecology. She is the co-organiser of the UK Ladybird Survey, alongside Dr Peter Brown, is a visiting professor in the School of Biological Sciences, University of Reading, is co-chair of the IPBES assessment of invasive alien species, and is a past President of the Royal Entomological Society.

== Early life and education ==
Roy was born on 6 November 1969 in Plymouth, England. She was educated at Cowes High School, a state secondary school on the Isle of Wight. From 1989 to 1992, she studied biology at the University of Southampton, graduating with an upper-second class Bachelor of Science (BSc) degree. From 1993 to 1994, she studied environmental science at the University of Nottingham, graduating with a Master of Science (MSc) degree. She remained at Nottingham to undertake a Doctor of Philosophy (PhD) degree, which she completed in 1997 with a doctoral thesis titled "Interactions between aphid predators and the entomopathogenic fungus Erynia neoaphidis".

== Honours ==
Roy was awarded the 2012 Silver Medal by the Zoological Society of London "for contributions to the scientific understanding of ladybird ecology and conservation". In the 2018 New Year Honours, she was appointed a Member of the Order of the British Empire (MBE) "for services to biodiversity research, science communication and citizen science". In 2020 she was awarded the British Ecological Society's Ecological Engagement Award for her work in citizen science and public engagement.

== Selected works ==
- Roy, Helen E.; Wajnberg, Eric, eds. (2008). From biological control to invasion : the ladybird harmonia axyridis as a model species. Springer. ISBN 978-1402069383.
- Majerus, Michael (2016). Roy, Helen; Brown, Peter (eds.). A natural history of ladybird beetles. Cambridge: Cambridge University Press. ISBN 978-1107116078.
- Roy, Helen; Brown, Peter (2018). Field Guide to the Ladybirds of Great Britain and Ireland. London: Bloomsbury Wildlife. ISBN 978-1472935687.
