= Spurrell's woolly bat =

Conservation status
- Least Concern (IUCN 3.1)

Scientific classification
- Kingdom: Animalia
- Phylum: Chordata
- Class: Mammalia
- Order: Chiroptera
- Family: Vespertilionidae
- Genus: Kerivoula
- Species: K. phalaena

Binomial name
- Kerivoula phalaena Thomas, 1912

Species of bat

Spurrell's woolly bat (Kerivoula phalaena) is a species of vesper bat in the family Vespertilionidae named after Herbert George Flaxman Spurrell. It is found in Cameroon, Democratic Republic of the Congo, Ivory Coast, Ghana, Guinea, Liberia, and Uganda. Its natural habitats are subtropical or tropical dry forests, subtropical or tropical moist lowland forests, and subtropical or tropical moist montane forests.
