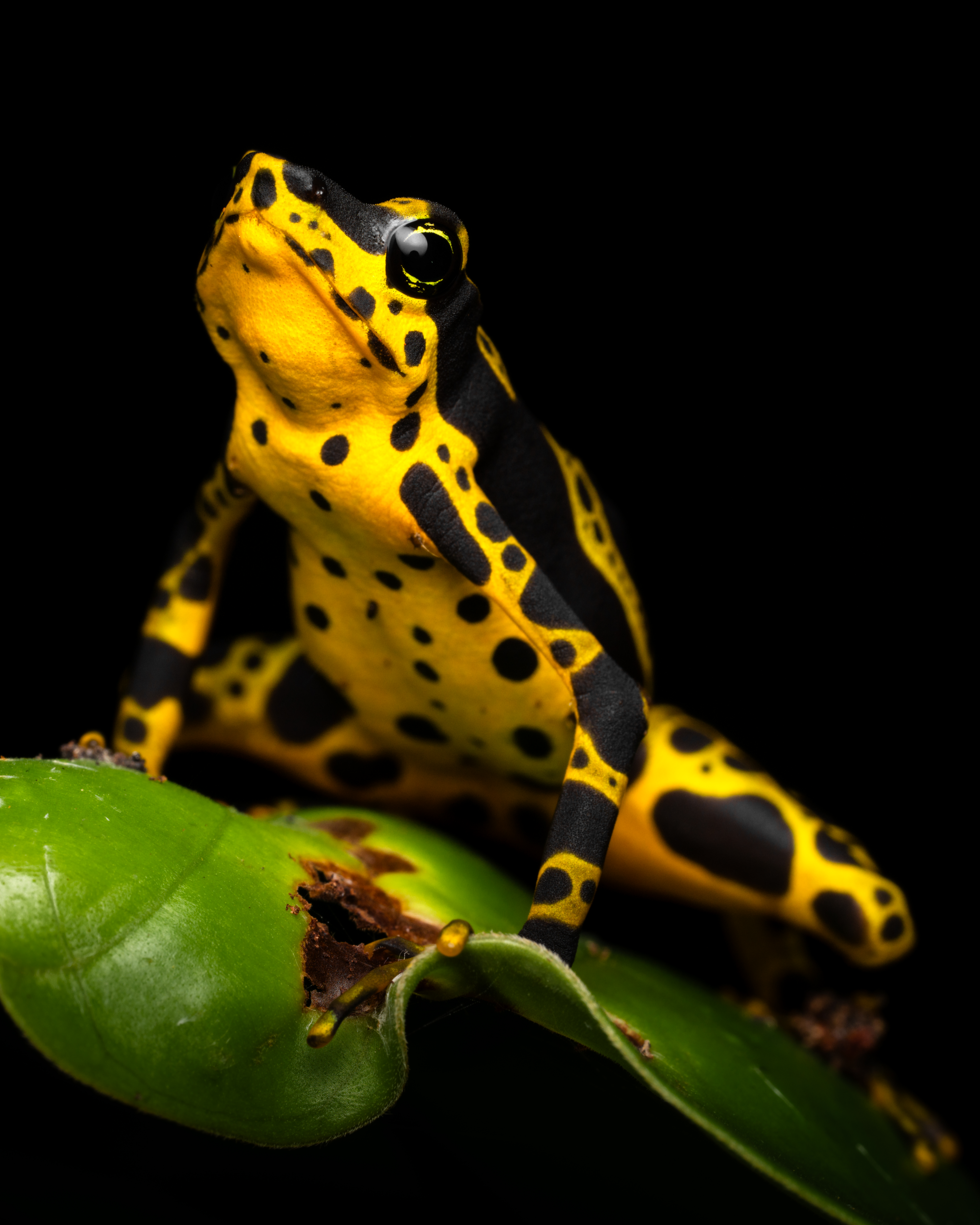

Conservation status
- Near Threatened (IUCN 3.1)

Scientific classification
- Kingdom: Animalia
- Phylum: Chordata
- Class: Amphibia
- Order: Anura
- Family: Bufonidae
- Genus: Atelopus
- Species: A. spurrelli

Binomial name
- Atelopus spurrelli Boulenger, 1914

= Atelopus spurrelli =

Species of amphibian

Atelopus spurrelli is a species of toad in the family Bufonidae. It is endemic to Colombia and occurs in the Pacific lowlands and foothills of the Cordillera Occidental. The specific name spurrelli honors Herbert George Flaxman Spurrell, a British physician and zoologist. Common name Condoto stubfoot toad has been coined for this species.

== Description ==
Male Atelopus spurrelli grow to a snout–vent length of 26 mm (1.0 in) and females to 34 mm (1.3 in). The body is elongated. The head is as long as it is wide. Skin is smooth to finely granular. The dorsum dark brown to black and has irregular yellow to olive green spots. The belly uniformly cream to white with small brown spots.

Skin of Atelopus spurrelli contains tetrodotoxin, although less than Atelopus spumarius and A. varius.

== Habitat and conservation ==
Atelopus spurrelli occurs in primary and secondary tropical humid forest at elevations of 50–900 m (160–2,950 ft) above sea level. It lives in leaf-litter near water, and presumably breeds in streams. It can be locally common, but has also declined or disappeared from many sites where chytridiomycosis has been reported. It can also be locally threatened by deforestation caused by agricultural development, illegal crops, illegal mining activities, and logging. Its range includes several protected areas, e.g., Utría National Park and El Amargal Nature Reserve.
