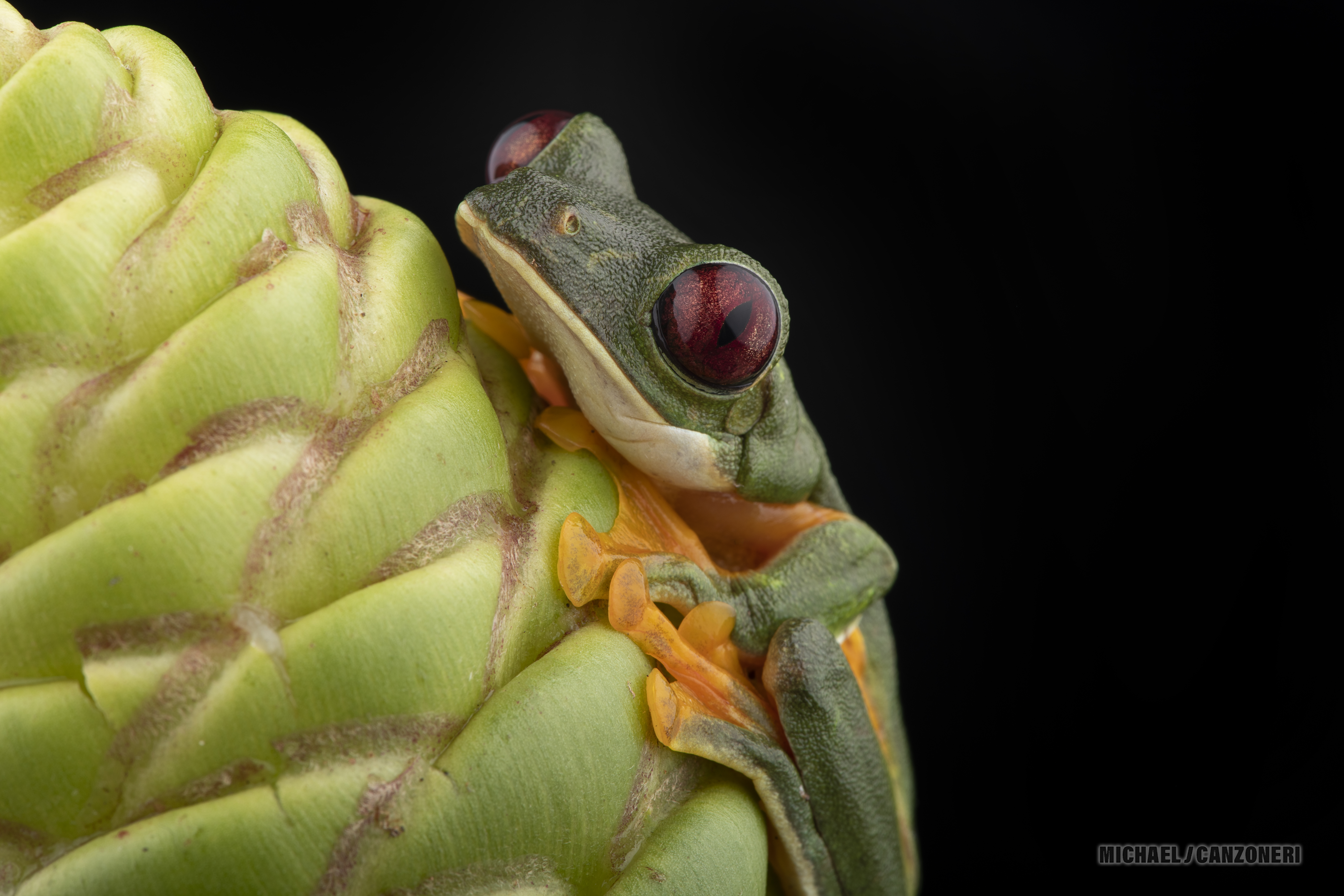

Conservation status
- Least Concern (IUCN 3.1)
- CITES Appendix II

Scientific classification
- Kingdom: Animalia
- Phylum: Chordata
- Class: Amphibia
- Order: Anura
- Family: Hylidae
- Genus: Agalychnis
- Species: A. spurrelli

Binomial name
- Agalychnis spurrelli Boulenger, 1913

Synonyms
- Agalychnis litodryas (Duellman & Trueb, 1967)

= Gliding tree frog =

Species of amphibian

The gliding tree frog (Agalychnis spurrelli) is a species of frog in the subfamily Phyllomedusinae. It is found in Colombia, Costa Rica, Ecuador, and Panama. Other common names are the gliding leaf frog, Spurrell's leaf frog, and pink-sided tree frog. The specific name, spurrelli, is in honour of British zoologist Herbert George Flaxman Spurrell.

Its natural habitats are subtropical or tropical moist lowland forests and intermittent freshwater marshes. It is threatened by habitat loss.

== Description ==
The gliding tree frog grows to a snout to vent length of 48 to 56 mm (1.9 to 2.2 in) for males and 60 to 72 mm (2.4 to 2.8 in) for females. The head is broad and the eyes are large, with reticulated lower eyelids. The body is slim with smooth skin on the dorsal surface and limbs and granular skin on the belly. The limbs are slim and the fingers and toes have adhesive discs. The fingers are about three-quarter webbed and the toes fully webbed. The colour of the dorsal surface of this frog changes at nightfall from pale green to dark green. The underparts are cream and orange.

== Distribution ==
The gliding tree frog is native to the humid forests of south-eastern and south-western Costa Rica, Panama, the Pacific lowlands of Colombia, and north-western Ecuador.

== Biology ==
The gliding tree frog is a nocturnal species that lives in the tree canopy. It moves about by climbing using a hand-over-hand form of locomotion. It also glides while leaping which it does by spreading out its hands and feet when the extensive webbing acts as a parachute. It can maintain an angle of descent of up to 45° for some distance.

Explosive breeding takes place in the rainy season. The eggs are laid in small clusters on the upperside of leaves overhanging temporary pools and water-filled cavities in logs. The eggs hatch in about six days and the tadpoles fall into the water below.
