= Herbert George Flaxman Spurrell =

British zoologist

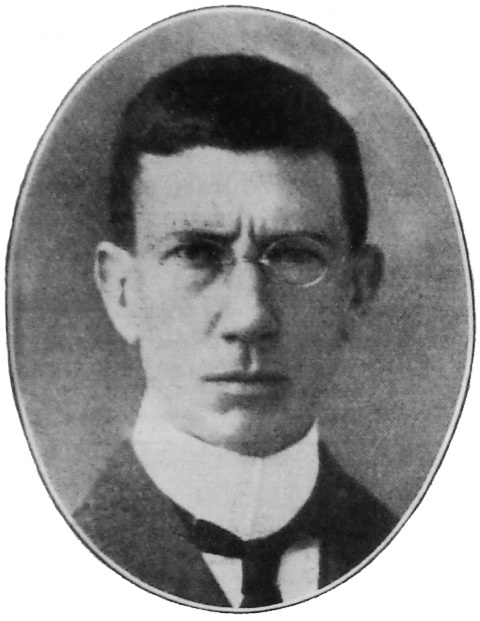

Herbert George Flaxman Spurrell M.A. M.B. B.Ch. F.Z.S. (20 June 1877 – 8 November 1918) was a British biologist, physician and author whose work in South America and Africa led to the discovery of several new species.

== Family and education ==
Spurrell was born in Eastbourne, Sussex, where is father, Herbert Spurrell, practised as an architect in partnership with Robert Knott Blessley. He was descended from the Spurrell family of Norfolk and was a nephew of the archaeologist Flaxman Charles John Spurrell.

As a student at Merton College, Oxford, Spurrell was a member of the Bodley Club. He completed his medical training at the London Hospital, qualifying in 1907, before studying under Gustav Mann at Tulane University in Louisiana, where he was also assistant professor of physiology. In 1912 he was awarded a further degree by the London School of Tropical Medicine.

== Career ==
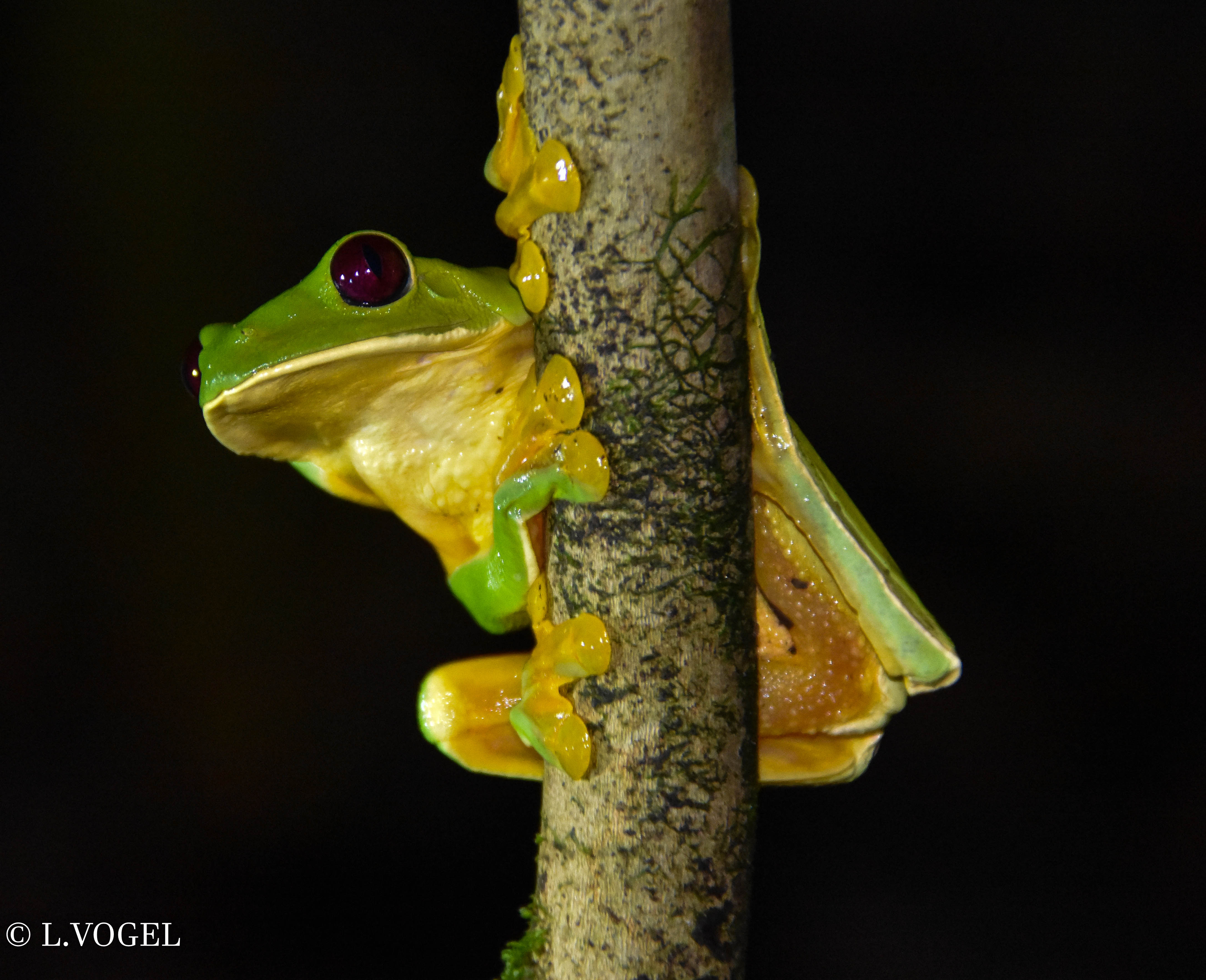
The gliding tree frog (Agalychnis spurrelli), named in honour of Spurrell.

Spurrell's zoological research led to the discovery and classification of fish, reptiles and frogs from South America and West Africa, particularly from Colombia and the Gold Coast. He donated several specimens to London Zoo, and in recognition of his work was elected a Fellow of the Zoological Society.

Among the species named after him are Spurrell's free-tailed bat and Spurrell's woolly bat. He is also commemorated in the scientific names of three species of reptiles (Amphisbaena spurrelli, Kinosternon spurrelli, and Micrurus spurrelli) and two amphibians (Atelopus spurrelli and Agalychnis spurrelli).

After a year serving as temporary medical officer at Obuasi on the Gold Coast, Spurrell joined the Royal Army Medical Corps as a lieutenant (later captain) in 1917. He died of pneumonia at Alexandria, Egypt, on 8 November 1918, and is buried at the Hadra War Memorial Cemetery.

Spurrell also wrote a historical novel. At Sunrise: A story of the Beltane (1904) is set in Iron Age Britain at the time of the Roman Conquest.

== Works ==
Spurrell published a number of scientific papers and was also the author of several works of fiction and non-fiction:

- The Commonwealth of Cells: Some popular essays on human physiology, Bailliere, Tindall & Cox (1901)
- Out of the Past, Greening (1903)
- At Sunrise: A story of the Beltane, Greening (1904)
- Patriotism: A biological study, George Bell & Sons (1911)
- Modern Man and his Forerunners: A short study of the human species living and extinct, George Bell & Sons (1917)
