= Mill Road Cemetery =

CWGC cemetery in Thiepval, Somme, Picardie, France

- Commonwealth War Graves Commission
- Used for those deceased 1914–1918
- Established: Spring 1917
- Location: 50°3′39″N 2°41′02″E near Thiepval, Somme, France
- Total burials: 1,304
- Unknowns: 815
- Commemorated: 489

Burials by nation
- Allied Powers

Burials by war
- World War I: 1,304

UNESCO World Heritage Site
- Official name: Funerary and memory sites of the First World War (Western Front)
- Type: Cultural
- Criteria: i, ii, vi
- Designated: 2023 (45th session)
- Reference no.: 1567-SE02

Mill Road Cemetery is a Commonwealth War Graves Commission burial ground for the dead of World War I situated near the French town of Thiepval.

The cemetery was established as a battlefield cemetery for troops killed in the Battle of the Somme. Battlefield clearances of the surrounding area in 1919 significantly increased the size of the cemetery. The cemetery was extended after the Armistice, with graves brought in from the battlefields of Beaumont-Hamel and Thiepval, and from the smaller Division Road Cemeteries No. 1 and No. 3 and St Pierre-Divion Cemetery No. 2.

The cemetery now contains the graves of 1,304 Commonwealth soldiers, 815 of which are unidentified. The cemetery was designed by Sir Herbert Baker.
