= Simon Biesheuvel =

South African psychologist

- Born: 3 April 1908; Rotterdam, Netherlands
- Died: 13 June 1991 (aged 83); Johannesburg, South Africa
- Education: University of Cape Town; University of Edinburgh
- Spouse: Erica Sharpley
- Children: Mary Ann; Sally
- Awards: Durban Medal (1956) and South Africa Medal (1962) from the Southern Africa Association for the Advancement of Science
- Scientific career
- Fields: Psychology
- Institutions: Stellenbosch University; University of the Witwatersrand; Council for Scientific and Industrial Research
- Thesis: The nature of temperament: a study of some fundamental factors (1933)

Simon Biesheuvel (3 April 1908 – 13 June 1991) was a Dutch-born South African psychologist. He is considered to be one of the most influential psychologists in the history of South Africa, and a 1991 obituary described him as "the doyen of psychologists in South Africa."

== Early life and education ==
Biesheuvel was born on 3 April 1908 in Rotterdam, the Netherlands. He was the oldest of four children of a father whose managerial career necessitated frequent moves. As a result, by the time Simon was a teenager, he had attended schools in five cities in four countries. Simon and his family moved to Cape Town, South Africa, in 1922, when he was fourteen. He received his B. A. degree from the University of Cape Town in 1929, where he majored in both psychology and English. He received his M. A. degree in psychology in 1930, also from the University of Cape Town, after which he traveled to Scotland to receive his Ph.D. from the University of Edinburgh in 1933.

== Career ==
From 1934 to 1935, Biesheuvel lectured in psychology at Stellenbosch University, and held the same position at the University of the Witwatersrand from 1936 to 1940. In 1940, during World War II, he was hired by the South African Air Force as the Officer Commanding of their Aptitude Test Section; he continued to hold this position until 1946. In 1946, he established the Council for Scientific and Industrial Research's National Institute for Personnel Research, of which he served as the founding director from then until 1962. In recognition of his research on African perceptions of European customs, he was honored by the South African Association for the Advancement of Science with their Durban Medal in 1956. He received the South Africa Medal from the same Association in 1962. In 1959, he delivered the fifteenth annual Alfred and Winifred Hoernlé Memorial Lecture.

== Work ==
Biesheuvel is noted for a 1943 monograph in which he argued for an environmental interpretation of the gap in intelligence test scores between whites and blacks in South Africa. In making these arguments, Biesheuvel also criticized the views of hereditarian psychologists such as M. L. Fick and Carl Brigham.

== Personal life and death ==
Biesheuvel married Erica Sharpley, and together they had two daughters: Mary Ann and Sally. Biesheuvel died on 13 June 1991 at his home in Johannesburg, South Africa.
