= Colin Graham Botha =

Grand Master of Lodge de Goede Hoop (South African Freemasons)
- In office 1957–1966
- Preceded by: Rose, J.G.
- Succeeded by: Conradie, E.

Personal details
- Born: 1 February 1973; August 15, 1883 Knysna, South Africa
- Died: February 1, 1973 (aged 89) Johannesburg, South Africa
- Spouse(s): Olive Stretch Honeyborne, Dorothea Johnson and Kathleen Helen Gordon Bartlett
- Children: 3
- Education: University of South Africa, University of Cape Town and the University of the Witwatersrand
- Known for: Heraldist, military and Freemason

Colin Graham Botha (born Knysna 15 August 1883; died Johannesburg 1 February 1973) was a South African civil servant, historian, archivist, heraldist, soldier and South African Freemason.

== Soldier ==
He served in home defence units in the Anglo-Boer War (1899–1902) and World War I (1914–18). After the world war, he was an officer in the Duke of Edinburgh's Own Rifles, and commanded the regiment, with the rank of lieutenant-colonel, from 1935 to 1937. He was awarded the Colonial Auxiliary Forces Officers' Decoration for long service.

== Historian and archivist ==
Botha joined the Cape Colony's civil service in a temporary capacity in 1901, and was appointed to the permanent staff in 1903. He worked in the office of the Master of the Supreme Court, and passed the Civil Service Law Examination in 1904.

He also worked part-time in the Colonial Archives, and moved there permanently in 1912. He was head of the Cape Archives Depot from 1912 until 1944. He was also the first Chief Archivist of South Africa from 1919 to 1944. As such, he drafted the Public Archives Act 1922, for which he has been called "the father of the South African archives".

Botha published numerous books and articles on South African historical subjects. They include The French Refugees (1919), Social Life in Cape Colony in the Eighteenth Century (1926) and Our South Africa, Past and Present (1938). His writings were re-published in 1962 as The Collected Works of C. Graham Botha, in three volumes.

He was a member of the Historical Monuments Commission, the Suid-Afrikaanse Akademie vir Wetenskap en Kuns, and various historical and literary societies in the United Kingdom, the United States of America, and the Netherlands.

Botha received three honorary degrees : Master of Arts from University of South Africa in 1936, and doctorates from the University of Cape Town in 1943 and the University of the Witwatersrand in 1952.

== Heraldist ==
Botha was interested in heraldry, and dealt with many heraldic enquries at the Archives. He designed some coats of arms, including those of Paarl (1951). He was a founding member of the Heraldry Society of Southern Africa, its first chairman from 1953 to 1954, and its honorary life president from 1954 to 1973.

== Freemason ==
He was an active freemason for many years, and was the first Grand Master of the Grand Lodge of South Africa after it separated from the Netherlandic order in 1961.

== Personal life ==
He was born to Michael Christiaan Botha and Elizabeth Mary Young. He married three times. He was married to Olive Stretch Honeyborne, Dorothea Johnson, and Kathleen Helen Gordon Bartlett.
