= Harold Benjamin Fantham =

British zoologist and parasitologist

Harold Benjamin Fantham (1876 — 1937) was a zoologist and in particular a parasitologist who contributed to major discoveries in the field. He died of sepsis at the age of 60, while he was head of the department of zoology at McGill University, Montreal.

Fantham studied at the University College, London, the Royal College of Science, and then at Christ's College, Cambridge where he was a research fellow. After teaching and research posts in London, Cambridge, and Liverpool, Fantham was appointed professor of zoology and comparative anatomy at the University of the Witswatersrand. In the 1920s, he was a proponent of eugenics, and wrote widely on this topic. In 1933, Fantham took up the post of professor of zoology at McGill University.

Fantham was the first parasitologist to provide a detailed description of the life cycle of a coccidian parasite (Eimeria avium) in birds. He was assigned by the United Kingdom's Grouse Disease Enquiry to investigate the cause of heavy mortality in grouse chicks raised in Scotland. In 1910, he published in the Proceedings of the Zoological Society of London an article entitled "The Morphology and Life History of Eimeria (Coccidium) avium: A Sporozoon causing a fatal disease among young Grouse". In that article, Fantham drew, for the first time, and with great detail, the entire life cycle of Eimeria avium in an avian host, including its 3 phases: Sporogony, Schizogony and Gametogony.
