= Sentinel News =

South African local newspaper

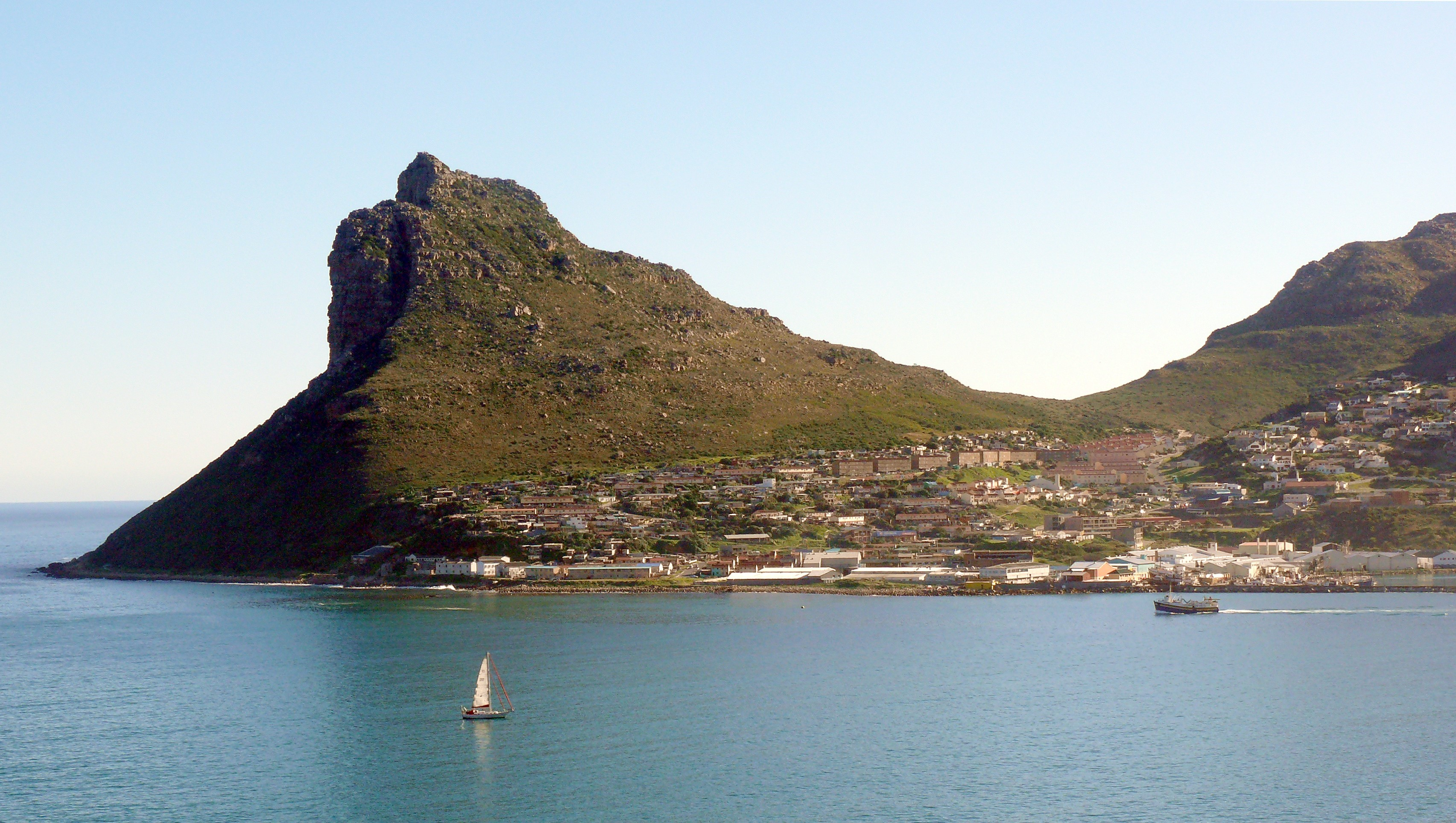
The Sentinel and the harbour at Hout Bay, South Africa

The Sentinel News is a local community newspaper in the Hout Bay, Imizamo Yethu, Harbour Heights, and llandudno regions of Cape Town, Western Cape, South Africa. It distributes to the Mainstream Shopping Centre and Victoria Mall areas. It is available in digital and print and, in 2024, it was distributed to 7,295 homes each Friday. The newspaper's content focuses on local personalities, editorial columns, sports, reader's letters, and community news.

The Sentinel was established in 1981 and is an Africa Community Media (ACM) title. It shares its name with a peak overlooking the Hout bay.
