= Elizabeth Baartman =

South African judge (born 1960)

The Honourable Elizabeth Baartman

Judge of the High Court
- Incumbent
- Assumed office 26 August 2009
- Appointed by: Jacob Zuma
- Division: Western Cape

Personal details
- Born: 3 December 1960 (age 65) Hangberg, Cape Province; Union of South Africa
- Education: University of the Western Cape

Elizabeth Dorothy Baartman (born 3 December 1960) is a South African judge of the Western Cape Division of the High Court of South Africa. Before President Jacob Zuma appointed her to the bench in August 2009, she was an advocate and prosecutor for the National Prosecuting Authority. She also served a decade as a magistrate in Cape Town.

== Early life and education ==
Born on 3 December 1960, Baartman grew up in Hangberg in Cape Town. Her father was a fisherman, and she was classified as Coloured under apartheid. After attending grade school in Hout Bay, she matriculated in 1979 at Grassy Park High School on the Cape Flats. Thereafter she studied law at the University of the Western Cape, completing a BJuris in 1986 and an LLB in 1992.

== Legal career ==
Baartman worked full-time throughout her LLB studies: she was a prosecutor from February 1986 to February 1991, working primarily in the district courts of Athlone and Wynberg, and then she took up a position as a magistrate. She continued her work as a magistrate after her graduation, handling family law and civil matters. In addition, she was admitted as an advocate of the High Court of South Africa on 3 September 1993.

She left the magistracy at the end of July 2001. Thereafter, from December 2001 to June 2003, she was the director of the Peoples Family Law Centre, a non-profit organisation which provided family law services. In July 2003, she returned to the National Prosecuting Authority (NPA) as a senior state advocate in the Asset Forfeiture Unit. She also deputised Willie Hofmeyr as the unit's deputy director, initially in an acting capacity from 2005 and then in a permanent capacity from 2008.

However, in June 2007, Baartman entered the Office of the Chief Justice's Aspirant Women Judges training programme. However, the leadership of the NPA was concerned that it would create a conflict of interest for her to hold acting positions in the judiciary while employed as a prosecutor, an argument that she came to agree with. She therefore resigned from the NPA with effect from 30 September 2008. Thereafter she was an acting judge in the High Court's Western Cape Division from October 2008 until she was appointed to the bench permanently in August 2009.

== Western Cape High Court: 2009–present ==
In July 2009, while serving as an acting judge, Baartman was one of five candidates whom the Judicial Service Commission shortlisted and interviewed for possible permanent appointment to one of two judicial vacancies in the Western Cape High Court. The Judicial Service Commission recommended her for appointment, and President Jacob Zuma confirmed her and Ashley Binns-Ward to the vacancies the following month. She joined the bench permanently with effect from 26 August 2009.

In 2021, Baartman presided in Busisiwe Mkhwebane's challenge against the constitutionality of the parliamentary section 194 inquiry instituted to impeach her.

== Appellate nominations ==
Baartman was an acting judge in the Supreme Court of Appeal from June 2015 to May 2016 and later from December 2023 to March 2024. She was twice shortlisted and interviewed for possible permanent appointment to the Supreme Court, once in April 2016 and again (this time with the support of former Constitutional Court justice Kate O'Regan) in April 2018. On the first occasion, Supreme Court President Lex Mpati told her during her interview that the other judges of appeal believed that she "needed more honing with more acting stints" before she was ready to serve in the appellate court permanently; likewise, her lack of experience in complex constitutional adjudication was a matter of concern in the 2018 interview. The Judicial Service Commission did not recommend her for appointment on either occasion.
