= Sean Holmes =

Sean Holmes may refer to:

- Sean Holmes (theatre director)
- Sean Holmes (surfer)
