= Lichtenstein Castle (South Africa) =

- Schloss Lichtenstein; Lichtenstein Kasteel

General information
- Architectural style: Gothic Revival
- Location: 81 Harbour Road, Hout Bay, South Africa
- Coordinates: 34.04217°S 18.34185°E
- Construction started: 1986
- Construction stopped: 1998
- Client: Reynier Fritz
- Owner: Unknown Russian businessman, possibly Svetlana Besfamilnaya

Website
- lichtensteincastle.co.za

Lichtenstein Castle (German: Schloss Lichtenstein, Afrikaans: Lichtenstein Kasteel) is a mock castle in Hout Bay, Western Cape, South Africa, built on the Karbonkelberg and modelled after Lichtenstein Castle in Baden-Württemberg, Germany.

== Details ==
Lichtenstein Castle was built by German-born South African businessman Reynier Fritz. Construction began in 1986 and finished in 1998.

Fritz later converted the castle to a guest house before dying there. After his death, his widow Christine sold the property for 23 million rand to an unknown Russian businessman. Claimed to be haunted, the castle is one of the area's most local attractions. The castle can be rented out as a venue.

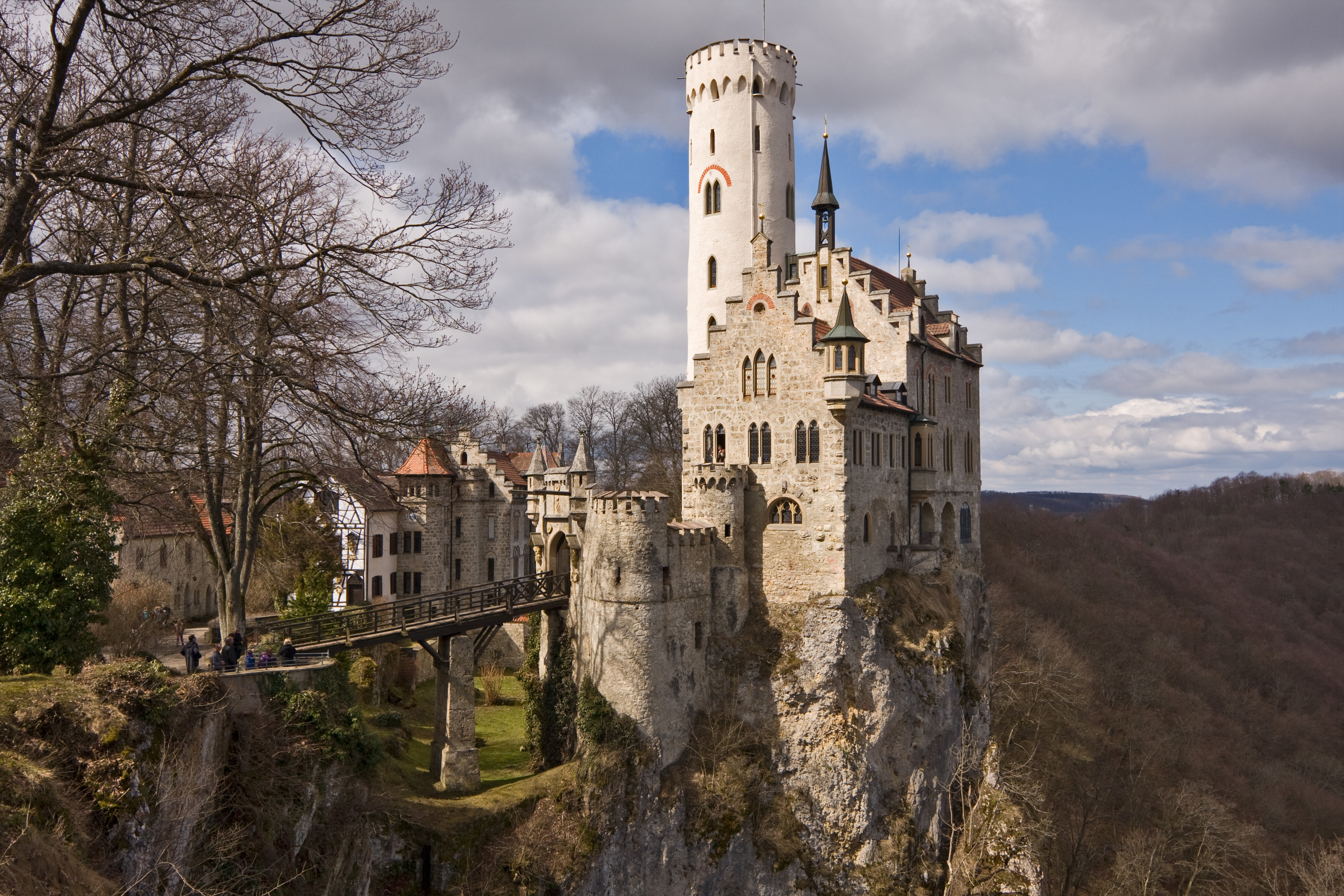
Schloss Lichtenstein in Germany after which the castle was modelled.

== See also ==
- List of castles and fortifications in South Africa
- List of castles in Africa
