= Hout Bay Museum =

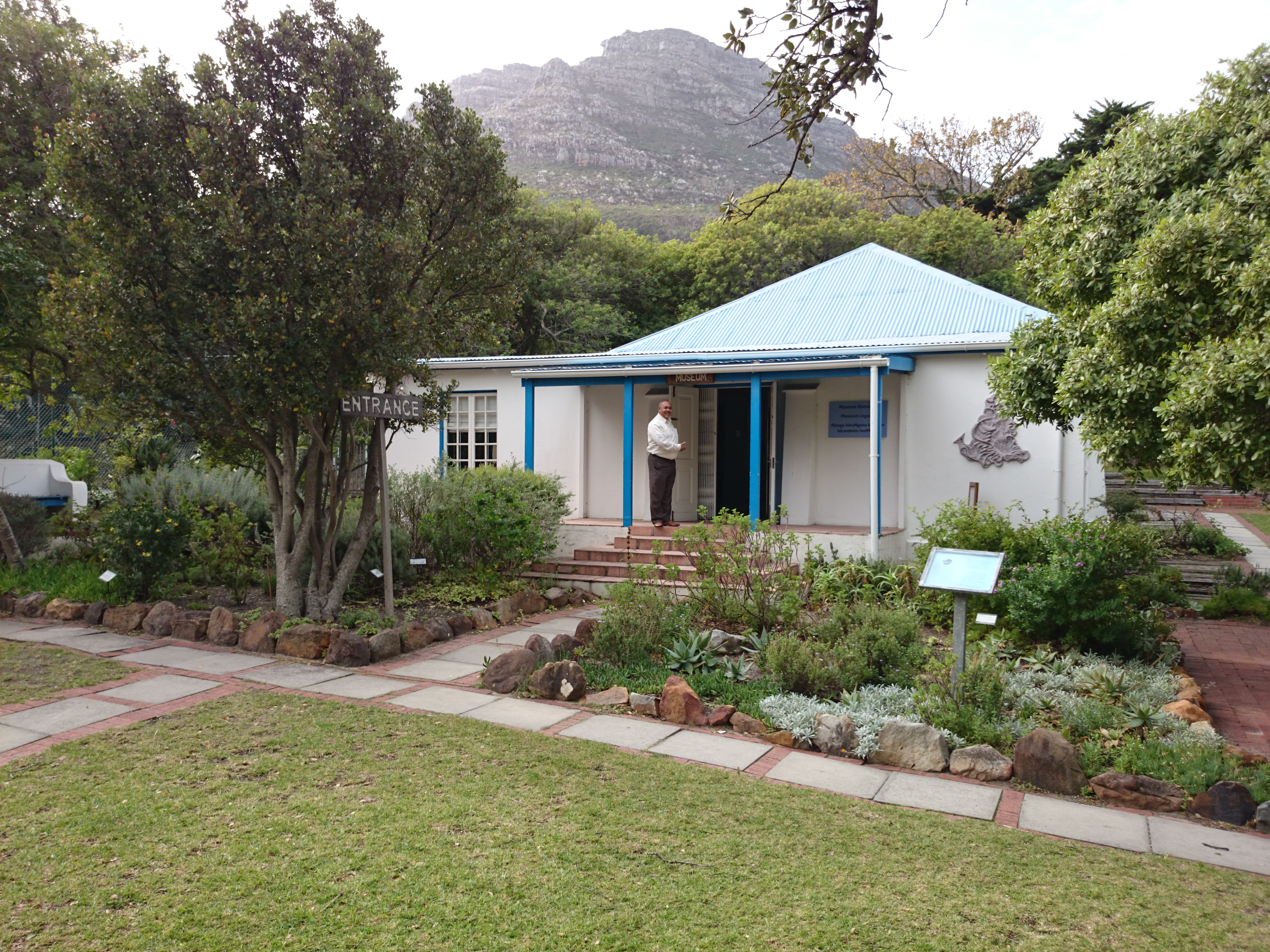
- Hout Bay Museum
- Established: 5 April 1979
- Location: Hout Bay, Cape Town, South Africa
- Coordinates: 34.040278°S 18.36°E
- Type: History museum
- Director: Western Cape Government
- Website: houtbaymuseum.co.za

Hout Bay Museum is a province-aided museum at 4 Andrews Road in Hout Bay near Cape Town, South Africa. Opened on 5 April 1979, the museum has displays on the history of the Hout Bay valley and its people, focusing on forestry, mining, and the fishing industry up to modern times. The museum also organises weekly guided nature walks into the surrounding mountains. The first curator at Hout Bay Museum was Pam Wormser.

== History ==
Jimmy Steele, a retired official of the Museum's Section, Department of Nature Conservation, had nurtured for many years the dream of founding a museum in Hout Bay. In 1975, a Cultural Arts Festival was held in the Bay. Apart from exhibitions by local craftsmen, musical and drama presentations, exhibitions on the history of Hout Bay were held - the Strandlopers, early Hout Bay residents, and the shipwrecks along our coast. This festival proved that Hout Bay had a fascinating history and it was important that a permanent home be found where all this information and artifacts belonging to our past could be preserved for the future.

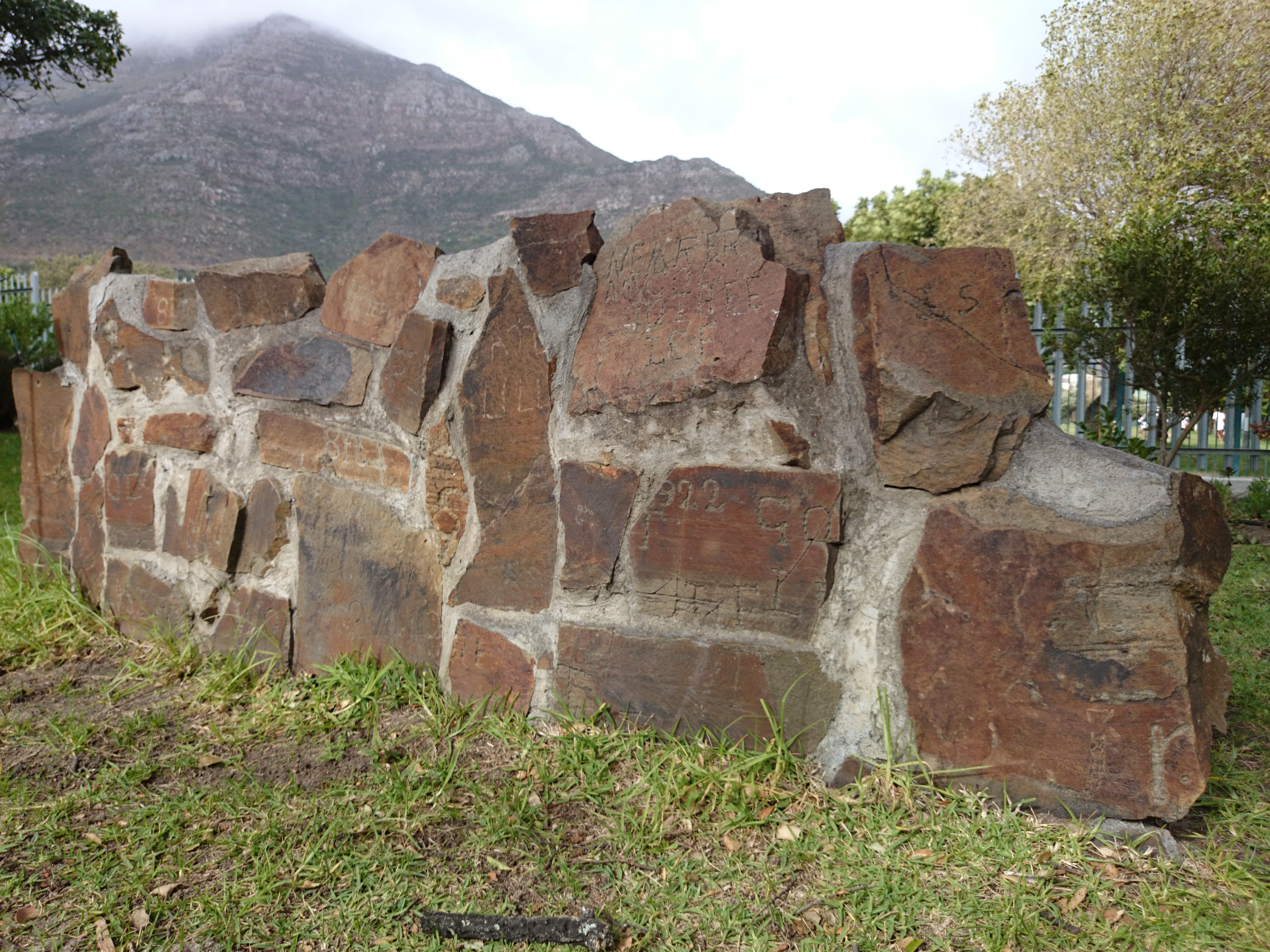
1922-made graffiti of fort workers, Hout Bay

Jimmy Steele was Chairman of the Festival Committee and at the Report Back Meeting at the end of the festival, it was proposed that he go ahead with negotiations to found a museum. With the backing of the Ratepayers Association he approached the Divisional Council of the Cape for the financial assistance and leased part of Kronendal School for the nominal fee of R1 per annum. The following chronology of dates and events portray the development of the museum.

11 July 1977. A grant of R8 500 per annum was finally agreed upon. In 1978, A report on how to renovate and develop the building suitable as a museum was drawn up by Mr E Hayden, Chief Technician for Museums. The Hout Bay/Llandudno Round Table undertook to alter and repair the building, which had originally been built as a house for the Headmaster of Kronendal School.

August 1978. Pam Wormser was appointed as first curator of the museum, and a special committee was appointed consisting of Jimmy Steele as chairman; Dr R Borchers and Mrs E. Bisschop as members of the committee.

1 September 1978. The first meeting was held. The initial task was to aim for Provincial recognition, then a board of trustees of six members would be appointed two to represent CPA, two the Divisional Council and two the subscribers to the museum.

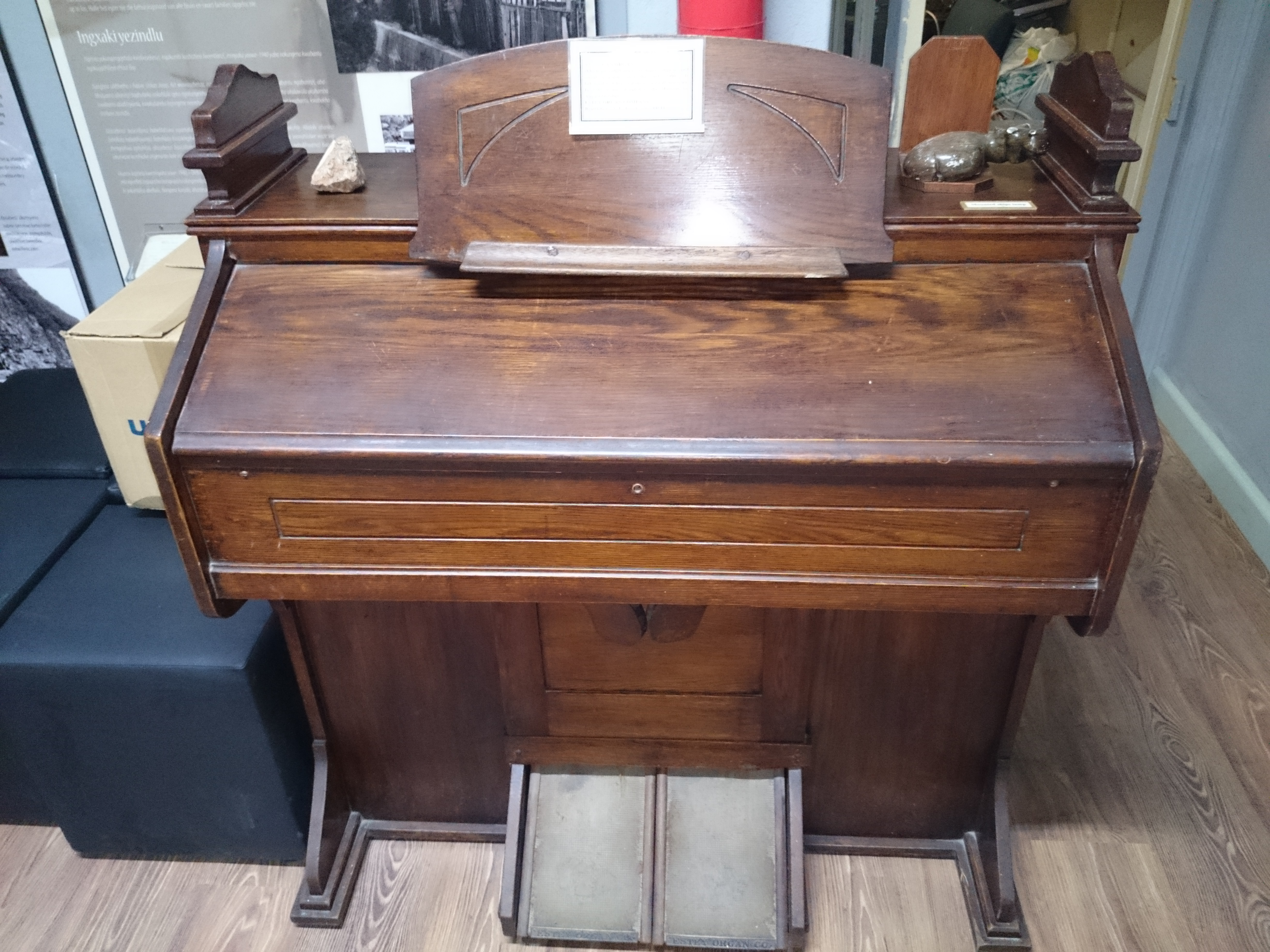
A 1983-donated organ to the Hout Bay Museum

Recording of Chris Solomon organ donated hout bay museum

25 October 1978. A lecture by Townley Johnson on the Strandlopers launched the appeal to start this Society. The museum's application for membership to the South African Museums Association was approved.

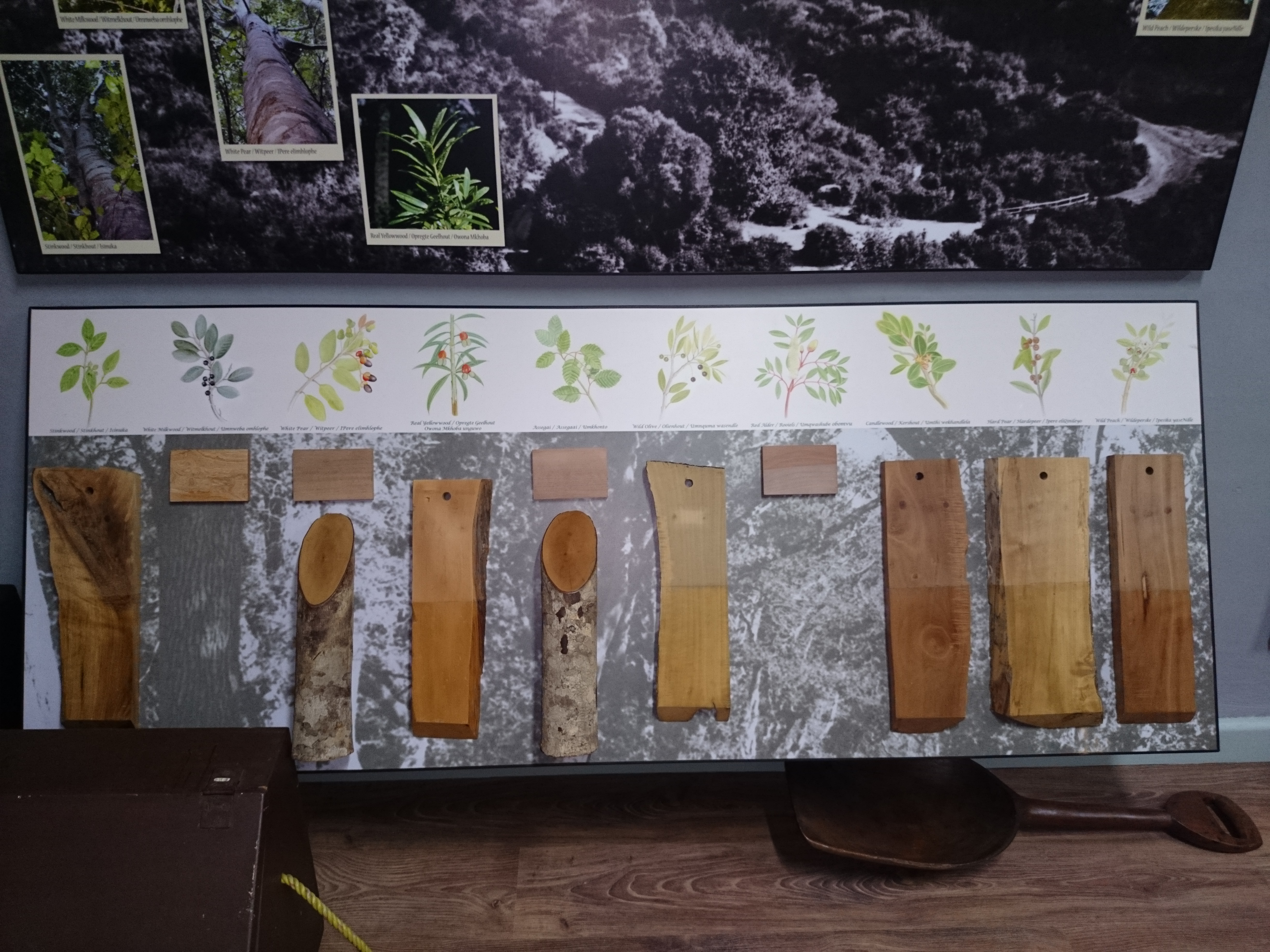
Some indigenous plant species on display

At the end of 1978 the museum had a furnished office, showcases and a host of artefacts and memorabilia from the farms, wrecks of the immediate area fishing paraphernalia. The early days of the museum were spent in furnishing the museum. Mr & Mrs Fuller Gee, qualified landscape architects, designed the layout of the garden, but work on the garden only commenced in 1979 after the formal opening of the Museum on 5 April.

In November 1979 Provincial recognition was granted and the Museum was declared a Local History Museum. The Museum continues to play an important role in education, hosting schools from all over the Peninsula. It holds exhibits, and stores and protects a wealth of information, records and photographs of local interest.

== Denis Goldberg House of Hope ==
In 2015, veteran anti-apartheid activist Denis Goldberg and four others established the non-profit Denis Goldberg Legacy Foundation Trust, with the aim of establishing an arts, cultural and educational centre, to be known as the Denis Goldberg House of Hope. In an interview in the 2018 UCT Alumni Magazine, Goldberg spoke of his passion for the project and belief in the role of art and culture in helping to bring about change, saying that South Africa was still a very divided society and that young people needed "to sing together, dance together, make poetry together".

Goldberg died on 29 April 2020, at which point it was stated that the Denis Goldberg House of Hope Arts and Culture Centre (or Denis Goldberg House of Hope Arts, Culture and Education Centre) would be situated at the Hout Bay Museum, and would house the Goldberg art collection, titled “Life is Wonderful”, and other memorabilia.
