= Carrol Boyes =

South-African teacher turned artist and businesswoman

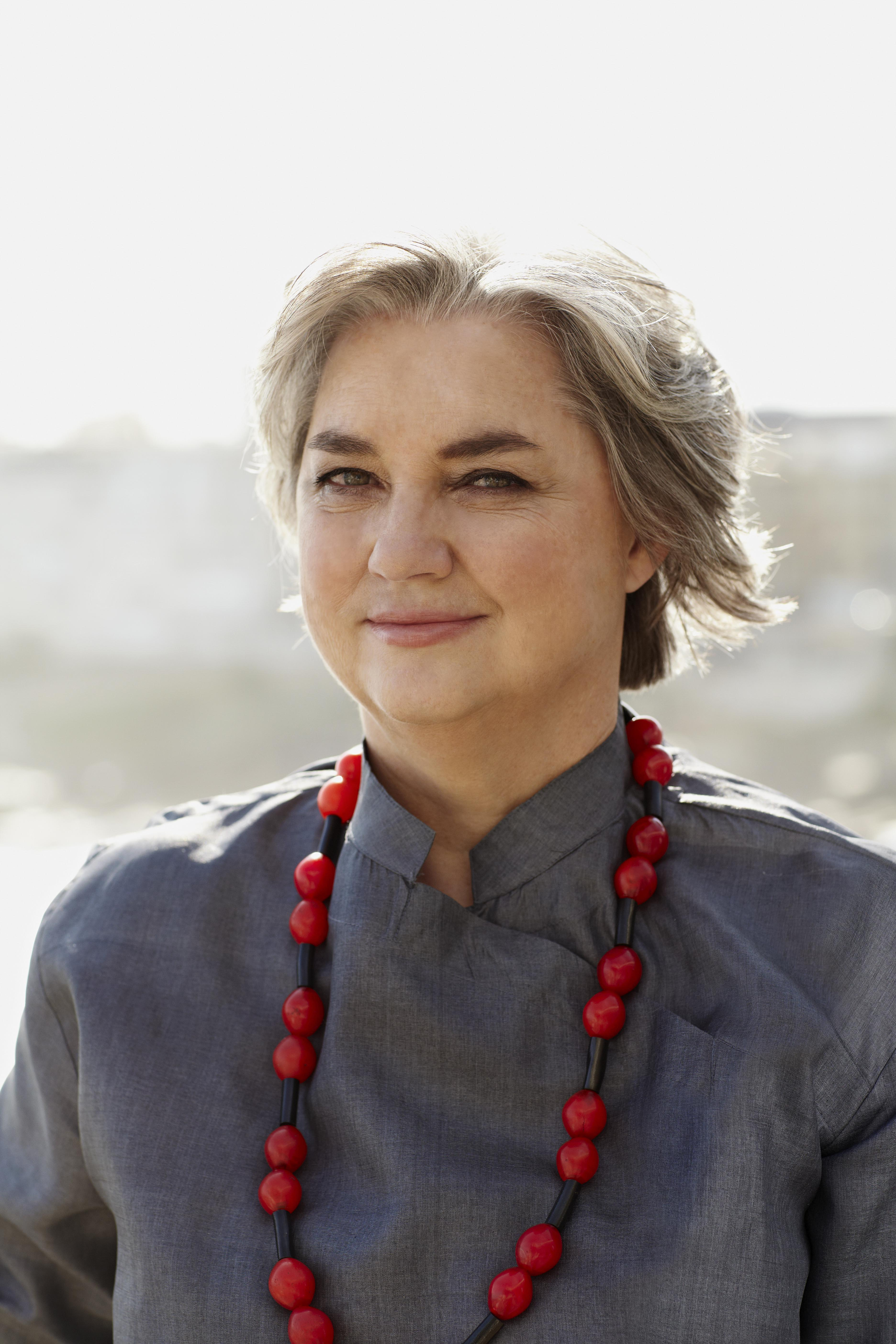
- Boyes in 2011
- Born: 21 November 1954
- Died: 14 August 2019 (aged 64)
- Education: University of Pretoria, St. Mary's Diocesan School for Girls, Pretoria
- Known for: Sculpture, metal work, jewelry, ceramics
- Website: carrolboyes.com

Carrol Boyes was a South African artist, businesswoman, and former teacher, best known as the founder of the Carrol Boyes Kitchen and eating utensil design company.

== Early life and career ==
Boyes grew up in the area around Tzaneen and Pretoria in South Africa and went on to study sculpture at the University of Pretoria obtaining a degree in Fine Arts. After graduation, she taught art and English in Hout Bay.

== Business ==
Boyes left teaching in 1989 when she turned 35 to focus on founding a company to design and produce crafts from her home in Cape Town, starting with jewelry made from clay and cuttlefish and then moving on to create her first items for sale from copper. She started selling her work from a stall in Greenmarket Square. By 1992, the company opened its first factory in Limpopo followed by another facility in Paarden Eiland, Cape Town. By the time of her death the company had grown to 45 outlets across South Africa with her products sold in 51 countries.

== Personal life ==
In 2010 Boyes lost ceramicist Barbara Jackson (age 60), her life partner, to breast cancer. Boyes herself died after a "brief illness" in 2019.
