= World of Birds Wildlife Sanctuary and Monkey Park =

Wildlife sanctuary in Hout Bay, Cape Town, South Africa

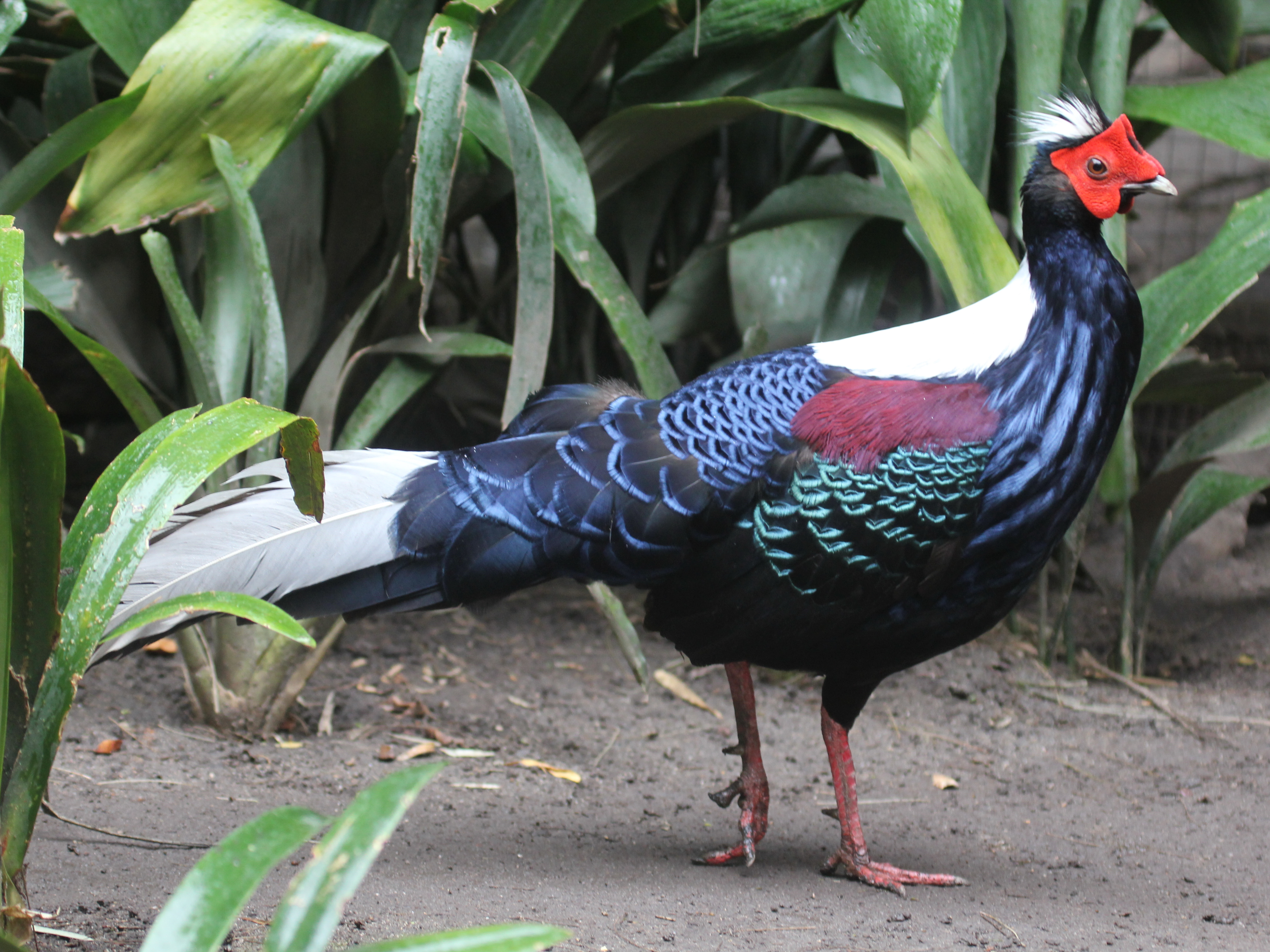
- Swinhoe's pheasant at World of Birds
- Interactive map of World of Birds Wildlife Sanctuary and Monkey Park
- 34°1′03″S 18°21′45″E
- Location: Hout Bay, Cape Town, South Africa
- Land area: 4 hectares (9.9 acres)
- No. of animals: 3,000+
- No. of species: 400
- Annual visitors: 100,000
- Website: World of Birds

World of Birds Wildlife Sanctuary and Monkey Park (often shortened to World of Birds) is an avian, reptilian and wildlife sanctuary in Hout Bay, a suburb of Cape Town in South Africa. As suggested by its name, the focus is primarily on birds and monkeys. It is the largest African bird park and among the bird parks in the world with the higher number of species.

== Exhibits and species ==
Of the approximately 400 animal species, about 330 are birds; the third-highest bird diversity of any zoo that primarily focuses on this animal group (only Weltvogelpark Walsrode, Birds of Eden, Kuala Lumpur Bird Park and Jurong Bird Park). The vast majority of the birds in the park are exhibited in walk-through aviaries. In total there are more than 100 aviaries.

Among the many birds are groups such as penguins, rheas, waterfowl, eagles, owls, pelicans, flamingos, pheasants, parrots, hornbills, turacos and weavers. Among mammals are various monkeys (such as baboons, marmosets and tamarins), meerkats and porcupines, and reptiles include green iguana, monitor lizards and tortoises.

In addition to exhibiting animals, World of Birds has a breeding center for threatened species and wildlife rehabilitation for injured (wild) birds.
