= Richard G. Holmes =

South African Paralympic athlete

Medal record

Paralympic athletics

Representing South Africa

Paralympic Games
| Bronze medal – third place | 1972 Heidelberg | Javelin 1A |

Richard Grenfell Holmes (born 8 December 1947) is a South African psychologist and Paralympic athlete who competed at the 1972 Summer Paralympics.

Holmes competed in the Athletics at the 1972 Summer Paralympics in Heidelberg, West Germany, in the Men's Javelin, Shot Put and Discus 1A category, winning the bronze medal in Javelin 1A.

Holmes is the uncle of South African professional surfer Sean Holmes.
