= Paul du Toit =

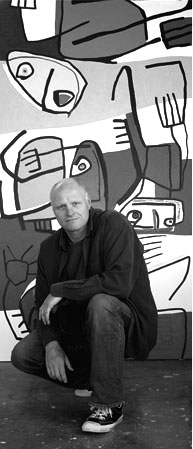
- Paul du Toit, 2005, Cape Town studio
- Born: Paul Johan du Toit; 31 October 1965; Johannesburg, South Africa
- Died: 9 January 2014 (aged 48)
- Known for: Painting, Sculpture, Ceramics, Mural
- Awards: Medal from Florence Biennale, nominated for Daimler Chrysler Sculpture award 2002
- Website: http://www.pauldutoit.com

Paul Johan du Toit (31 October 1965 – 9 January 2014) was a South African artist, working in painting, sculpture, paper and mixed media. His exhibits have been displayed globally. Most notably, three of his sculptures were selected for the 2001 Florence Biennale.

Among the many awards he has received is a medal from the city of Florence in the Biennale Internationale Dell'arte Contemporanea. He was nominated for the Daimler Chrysler Sculpture Award of 2002. Paul was recently invited to work with former president Nelson Mandela and international musicians on the 46664 campaign.

== Biography ==
Paul Johan du Toit was born on 31 October 1965 in Johannesburg. He grew up in Mayfair Johannesburg and his time was spent between his artist aunt, Elizabeth van der Sandt, and his father's workshop, where he used to create sculptures out of electrical gadgets while his aunt tutored him in oil painting techniques.

In 1984 Paul du Toit matriculated and in 1985 he was conscripted to the South African Air Force where he used the time to do some carpentry, make his first bronze work of an airplane and study computer science part-time through Pretoria Technikon. When he left the army he worked as a computer programmer In 1988, the company Paul du Toit worked for went into liquidation and he worked in a boring job at the bank to make ends meet. All this time he painted at night to keep his artistic flair alive.

In 1992, visit to Florence in Italy was to be a turning point in Paul's artistic career. So inspired was he by Michelangelo's David, that he returned fired with commitment to make his art work. This influence was further fuelled by their trip to Paris two years later, where the exposure to a group of sculptures made from polyurethane foam metal drums and plastic at the back of the Louvre, really resonated with him. He returned to South Africa and started making sculptures in his garage, from discarded materials. One of these won him the 'Best Artist with No Formal Training' at the Association of Arts in Bellville Cape.

In his Hout Bay studio Paul started using an impasto technique (thick industrial paste into which he scratched lines and images) which was to become intrinsic to his style of automatic scribbling. At this stage he also used his computer know-how to optimise his use of the internet and connect to the international art scene.

In 2014, du Toit died of cancer. He was 48.

== Art career + Art work ==
1997 Paul sold his first paintings locally. He also launched his website and his work was spotted by a gallery owner in Paris who invited him to exhibit in 1998. Paul decided to make art his career as he became part of a group exhibition at the Groot Constantia Art Gallery. 1998 was the year Paul hit the international circuit with his paintings being exhibited in many international and local exhibition. He appeared on the CNN International Art Club and held his first solo exhibition in Paris. 1999 marked a continuation of the local and international interest with shows in Moscow, Edinburgh and with local corporates buying some of Paul's work. 2000 was a coup for Paul as he was selected by Professor to be one of the 70 over 2000 – a noteworthy achievement. This led to a solo and group exhibition in Cape Town as well as exhibitions in the Netherlands and France. 2000 heralded the beginning of Paul's wooden sculptures. In 2001 he was nominated to exhibit works at the Florence Biennale of Contemporary Art where he won 5th place in the sculpture section. He was also nominated for the Daimler Chrysler Award for South African Sculpture. He held two solo exhibitions one at the Holland Art Fair in The Hague and the other in Cape Town.

== Gallery ==
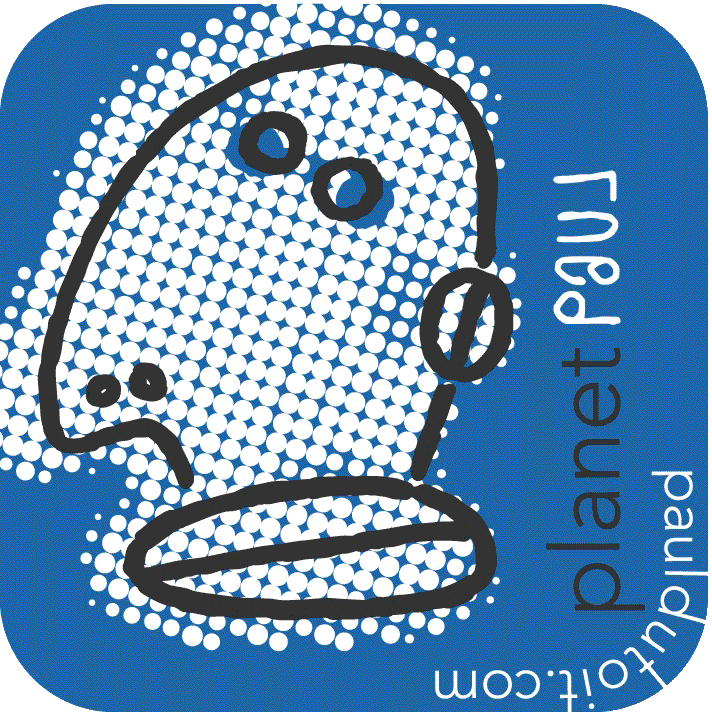
PlanetPaul logo

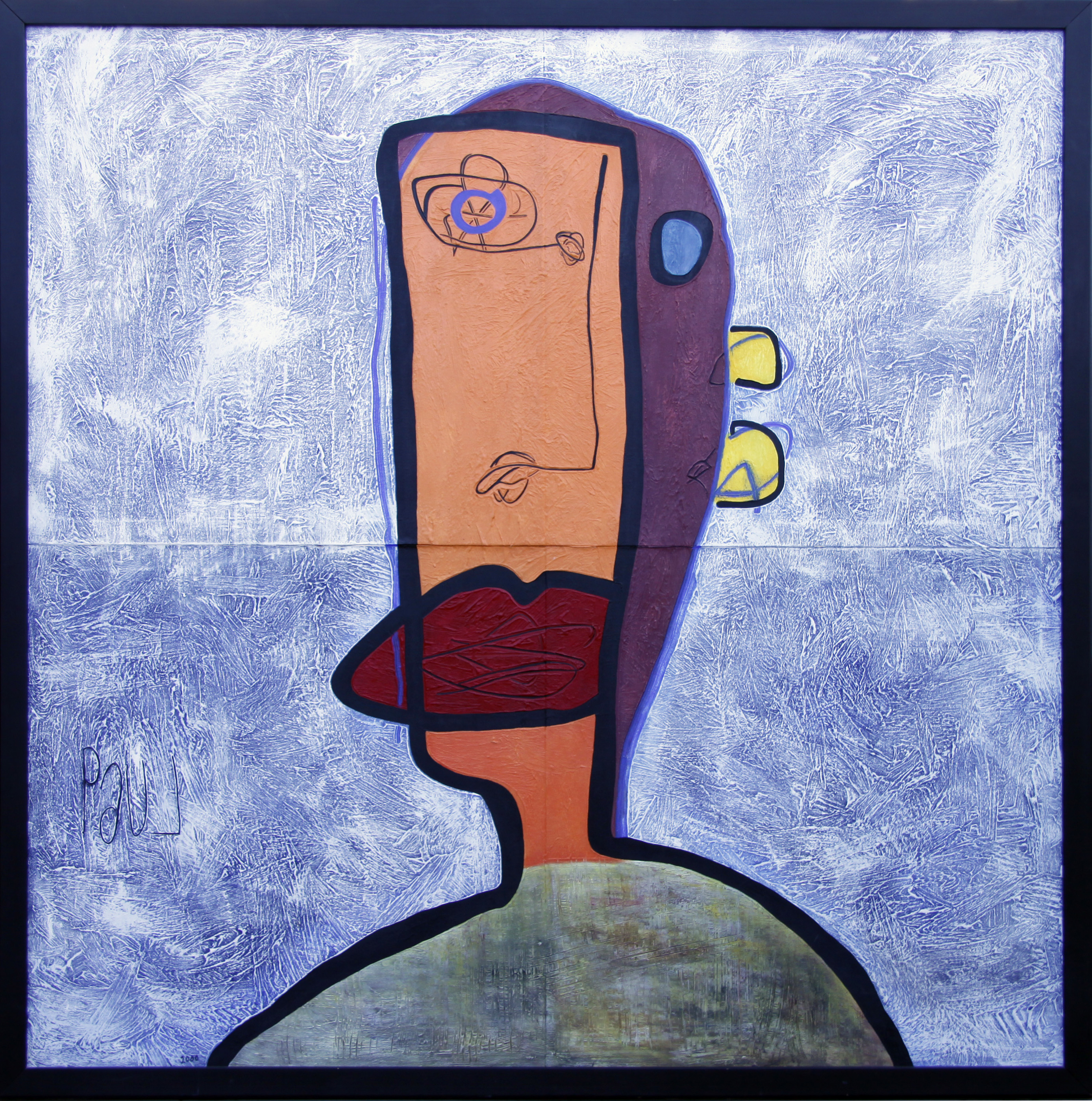
Well travelled, 2000, Acrylic on canvas, 2m x 2m, paul du toit
