= Sean Holmes (surfer) =

South African surfer

Personal information
- Born: 30 July 1977 (age 49) Malmesbury, South Africa
- Height: 173 cm (5 ft 8 in)
- Weight: 80 kg (180 lb)

Surfing career
- Sport: Surfing
- Best year: 2000 – first surfer to get a Red Bull Big Wave Africa title to his name
- Career earnings: $33,400 (as of 2009)
- Sponsors: Billabong, Geraghty Surfboards, Red Bull, Von Zipper

Surfing specifications
- Stance: Natural (regular) foot

Sean Holmes (born 30 July 1977) was a professional surfer from South Africa, competing in the World Surf League (WSL). In 2000 Holmes won Red Bull's Big Wave Africa. He won the event for a massive wave caught in the dying seconds of the final that he rode through to the channel and got tubed on.

Holmes grew up in Wilderness and started surfing at age 10. He spent 3 years on the WQS and achieved a highest WQS / WCT world tour rating of 32nd.

Holmes is known for his Barrel Riding and Clean Carving manoeuvres and he has been sponsored by Billabong and Redbull for most of his professional career.

Outside surf, Holmes gained a Bachelor of Business Science Degree majoring in Marketing from the University of Cape Town (UCT). For the past 17 years has endorsed and promoted several brands and worked for 3 years as marketing manager for Billabong SA, directly after which he joined Primi World as marketing manager in August 2007. Sean is responsible for planning, development and implementation of Primi World’s marketing strategies, marketing communications and public relations activities.

Holmes is the nephew of Paralympian Richard Holmes.

Competition Wins
Year	Event	Venue	Country
2000	Red Bull Big Wave Africa	Dungeons	South Africa
2000	SA Champs	Jeffreys Bay	South Africa
1998	SA Champs	Jeffreys Bay	South Africa
