= Imizamo Yethu =

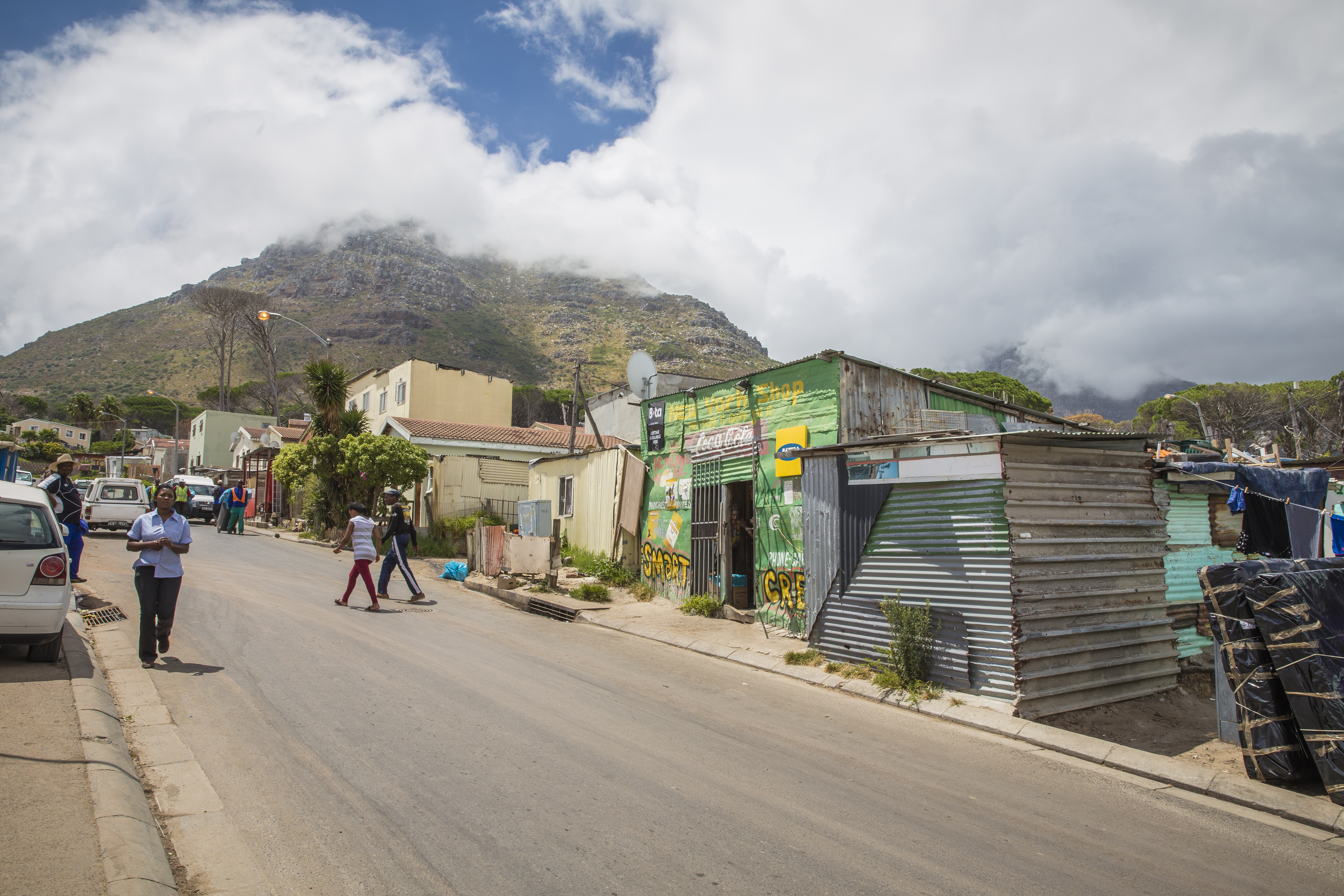
- Imizamo Yethu Township

- Location within Western Cape Location within South Africa
- Coordinates: 34°1′S 18°21′E
- Country: South Africa
- Province: Western Cape
- Municipality: City of Cape Town

Area
  - Total: 0.57 km^{2} (0.22 sq mi)

Population (2011)
  - Total: 15,538
  - Density: 27,000/km^{2} (71,000/sq mi)

Racial makeup (2011)
  - Black African: 91.6%
  - Coloured: 3.7%
  - Indian/Asian: 0.2%
  - White: 0.1%
  - Other: 4.4%

First languages (2011)
  - Xhosa: 59.5%
  - English: 10.7%
  - Afrikaans: 4.7%
  - Zulu: 3.4%
  - Other: 21.7%
- Time zone: UTC+2 (SAST)
- Postal code (street): 7806

Imizamo Yethu (Xhosa, meaning "Our Efforts" and commonly known as Mandela Park or IY) is an informal settlement in the greater Hout Bay Valley area. The 18 hectare settlement houses approximately 33 600 people..

== Infrastructure ==
The community living conditions were improved by the Niall Mellon Township Trust with their People's Housing Process in 2002. This non-profit organisation based in Ireland sent volunteers to build several hundred basic homes for individuals in Imizamo Yethu.

== Tourism industry ==
Residents provide tours of the preschool, day care, barber shop, auto shop, orphanage, grocery store and local pub. Many locals will also invite tourists into their homes where they sell hand-made bead work and jewellery.

== 2017 Fire ==
On 11 and 12 March 2017, a large section of Imizamo Yethu was devastated by fires that killed three people, destroyed 3,500 homes and displaced 15,000 people.
