= Karbonkelberg =

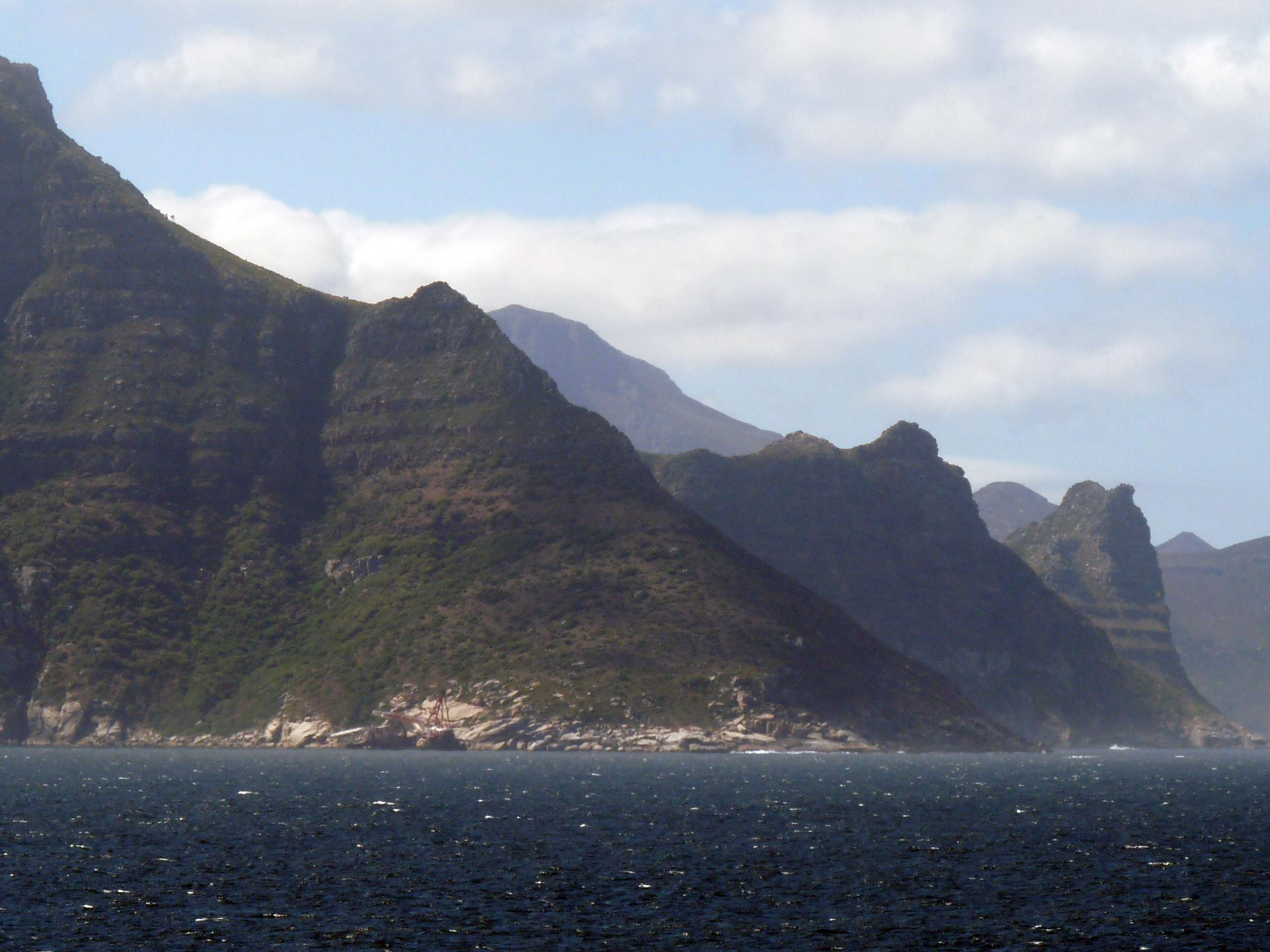
- View from the west of Duiker Point below the Karbonkelberg

Highest point
- Elevation: 653 m (2,142 ft)
- Listing: List of mountains in South Africa
- Coordinates: 34°2′S 18°19′E

Geography
- Location within South Africa
- Location: Hout Bay, South Africa

Karbonkelberg is a small peak forming part of the Table Mountain National Park in Cape Town, South Africa.

== Geography ==
It forms a prominent landmark overlooking the harbour at Hout Bay. An unusual feature is that sand has been blown up it by the wind, causing a dune-like feature. This has been popular with local residents to surf down it on polished boards or sheets. Its cliff on the southern side is also a famous climbing spot.

In the North it is bordered by Table Mountain National Park, comprising the Orangekloof Nature reserve and the lower slopes of Table Mountain beyond.

It is bordered by the Atlantic and Little Lions Head, Kapteins Peak and The Sentinel.

The peak is popular for short treks and mountainbiking.

== See also ==
- Cliff
