= Red Bull Big Wave Africa =

Annual surfing competition in South Africa

Coordinates: 34.06°S 18.325°E

The Red Bull Big Wave Africa is a surfing competition held annually in Cape Town, Western Cape, South Africa.

The event is held at "Dungeons", just east of The Sentinel, a peak in Hout Bay, Cape Town. The reef has been known since the 80's as a site for large Atlantic swells breaking over a reef. The competition is held between 24 July and 31 August each year, depending on when appropriately large waves are available. Between the first competition, in 1999, and 2007, only three victors had been decided.

In the 2008 competition, 24 competitors participated. The six finalists were drawn from the United States, Hawaii, Brazil, and South Africa for a first prize of R100 000. The competition was won by South African Grant "Twiggy" Baker.
