= The Sentinel (Hout Bay) =

- Hangberg
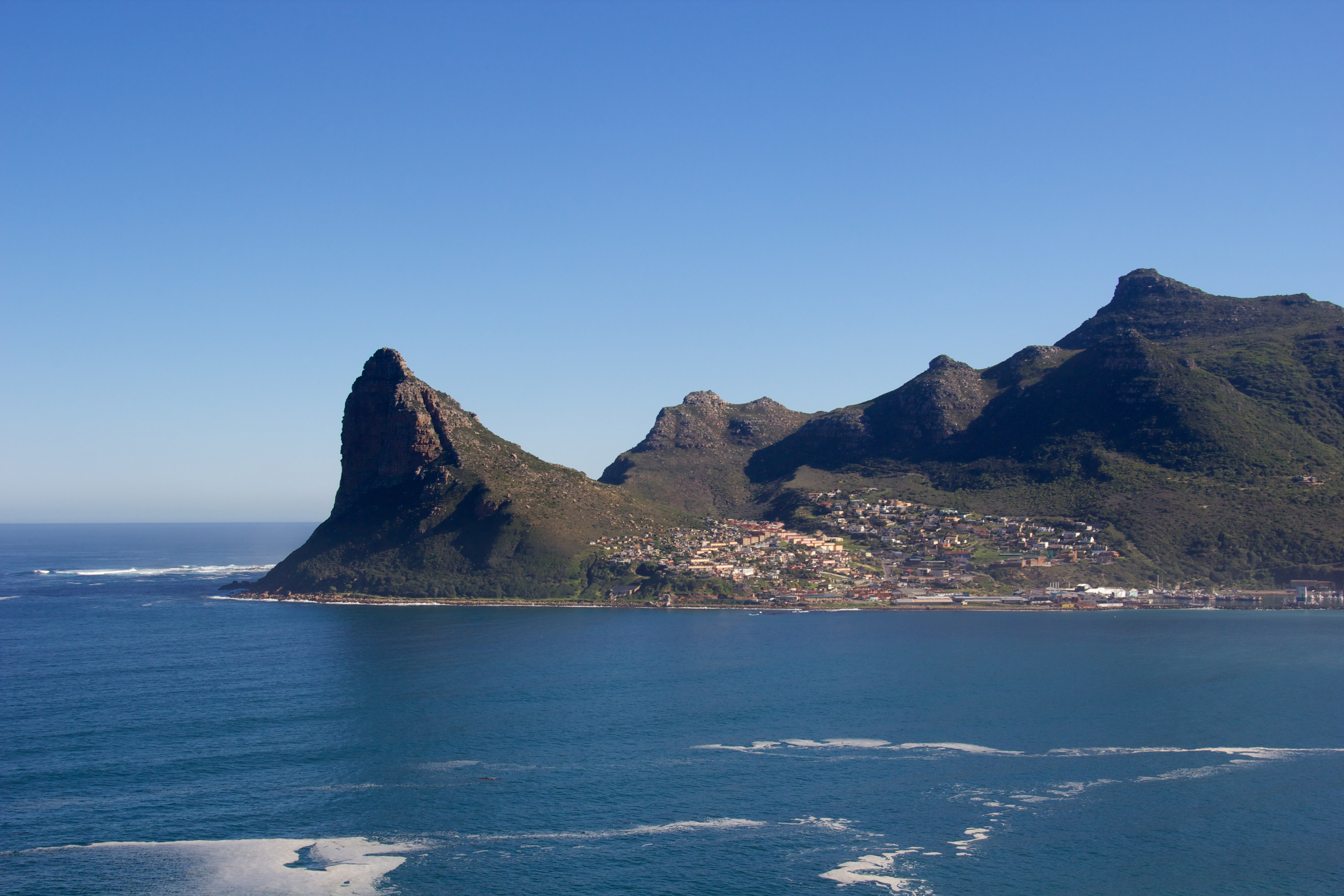
- The Sentinel

Highest point
- Elevation: 331 m (1,086 ft)
- Listing: List of mountains in South Africa
- Coordinates: 34°03′33″S 18°20′12″E

Geography
- Location within South Africa
- Location: Hout Bay, South Africa

The Sentinel or Hangberg is a peak marking the western end of the mouth of Hout Bay in South Africa. It has a sheer cliff dropping towards the sea, and a coastal hiking path is accessible at low tide. It is adjacent to Hout Bay Harbour and the Hangberg settlement, and to the higher Karbonkelberg peak. Just offshore to the south is a colony of Cape fur seals known as Seal Island, and a big wave surf spot known as "Dungeons", which has hosted the Red Bull Big Wave Africa competition.

== Possible sale ==
The mountain has been privately owned since 1901. In 2008, the mountain was advertised for sale by G&R Marine Services CC, who purchased it in 2003. The potential sale led to protests by the local Hangberg community. The land is zoned rural, which in theory would allow a single dwelling to be built, but it is surrounded by national park land, and SANParks, which wishes to see the peak incorporated into the Table Mountain National Park, indicated that it would not allow an access road under any circumstances.
