= Hangberg =

Neighbourhood of Hout Bay in Cape Town, South Africa

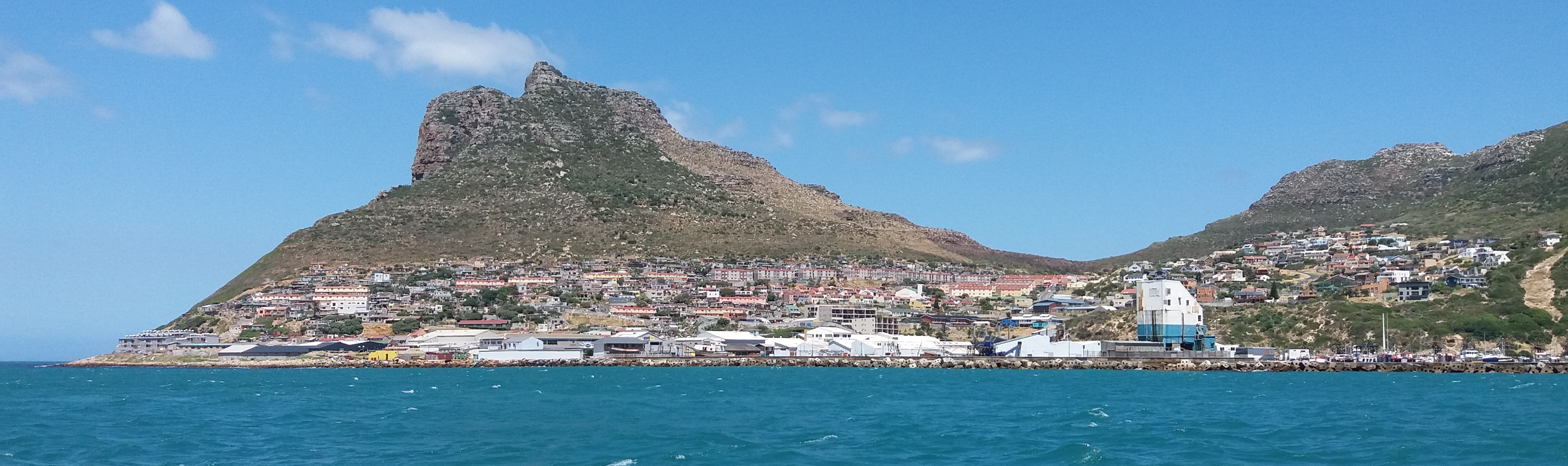
Hangberg seen behind Hout Bay Harbour

Hangberg is a neighbourhood of Hout Bay in Cape Town, South Africa. It is situated on the mountain slopes between Hout Bay Harbour and The Sentinel peak, and many of the residents are employed in fishing and other industries related to the harbour.

Under the apartheid system, the Group Areas Act designated Hangberg as a coloured residential area. Poverty and unemployment in Hangberg are high, and it has been the site of a number of political protests.

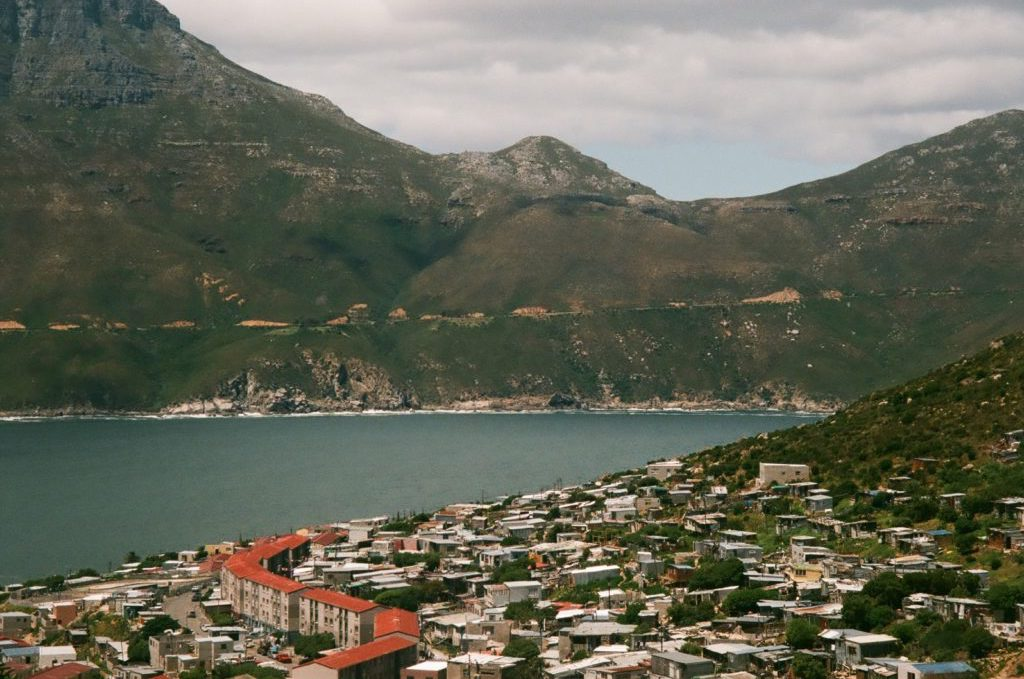
View of Hangberg from Hout Bay Heights
