= Hout Bay =

Harbour town in the Western Cape, South Africa

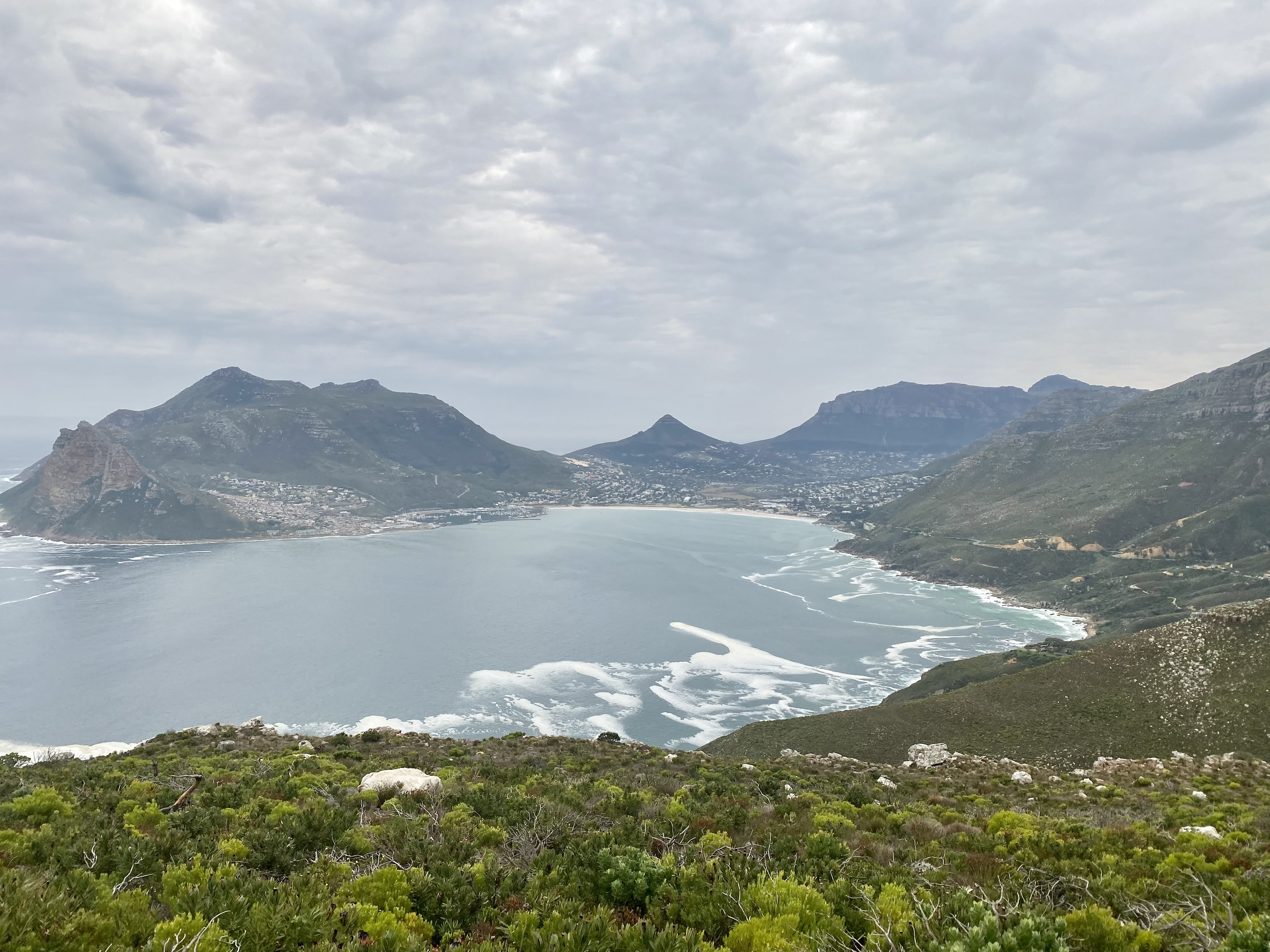
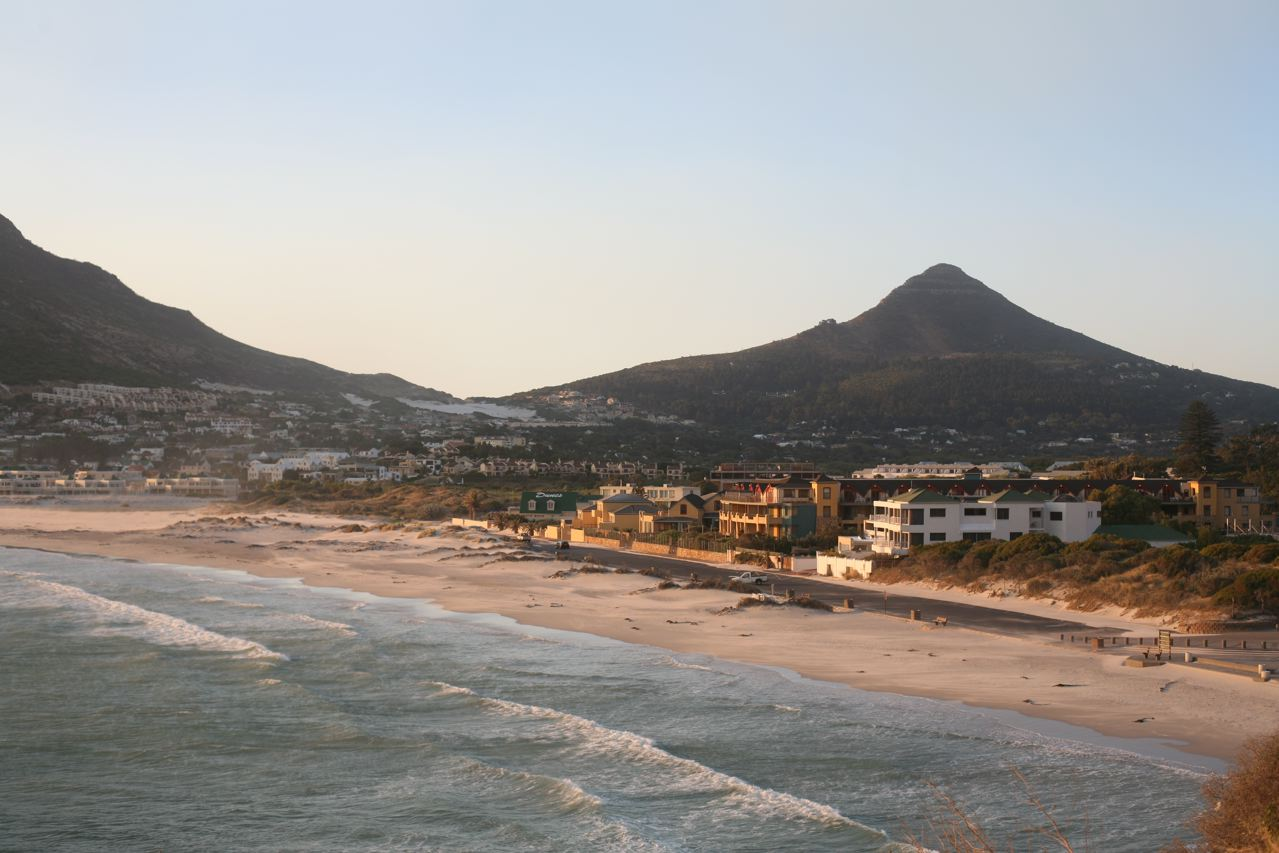
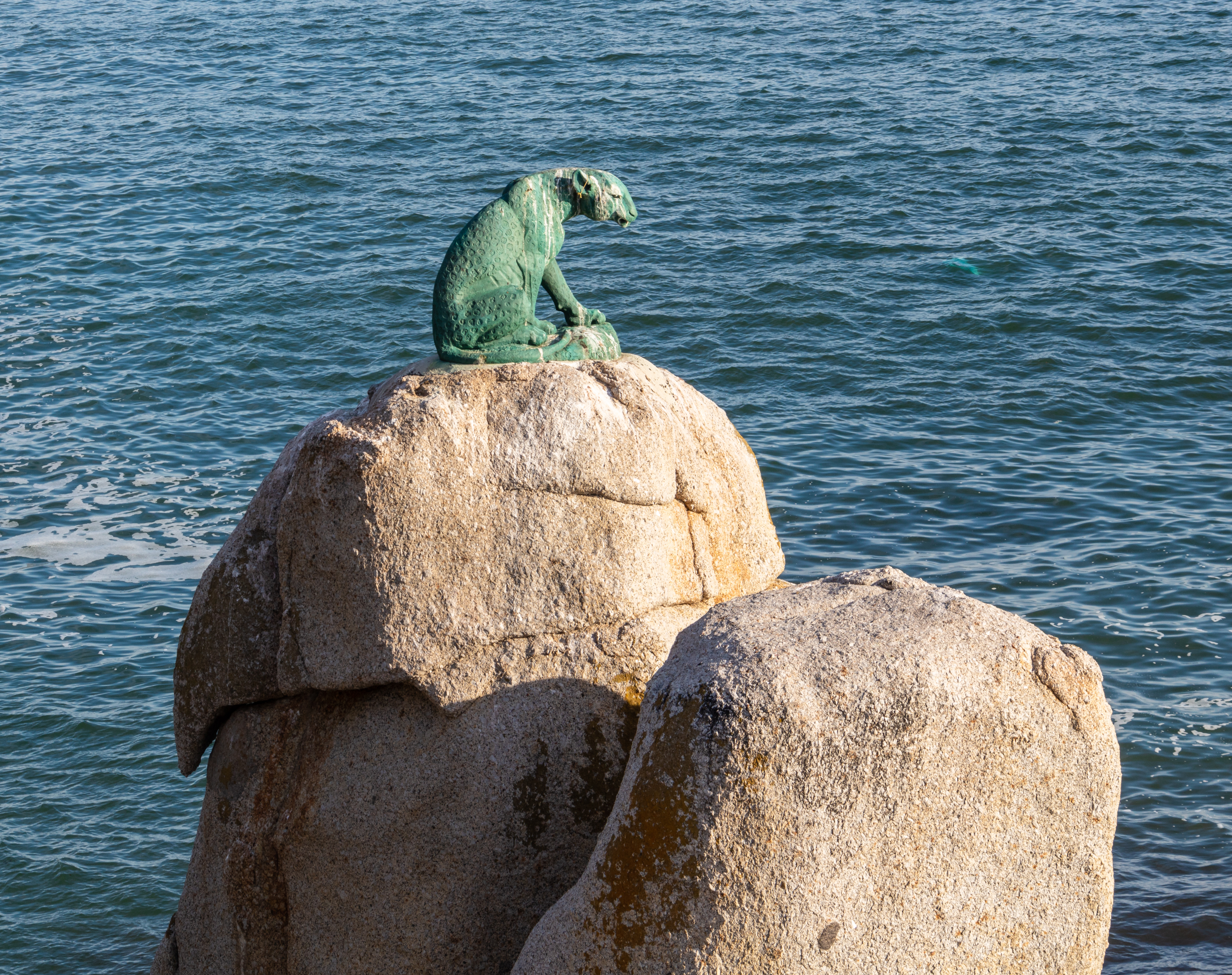
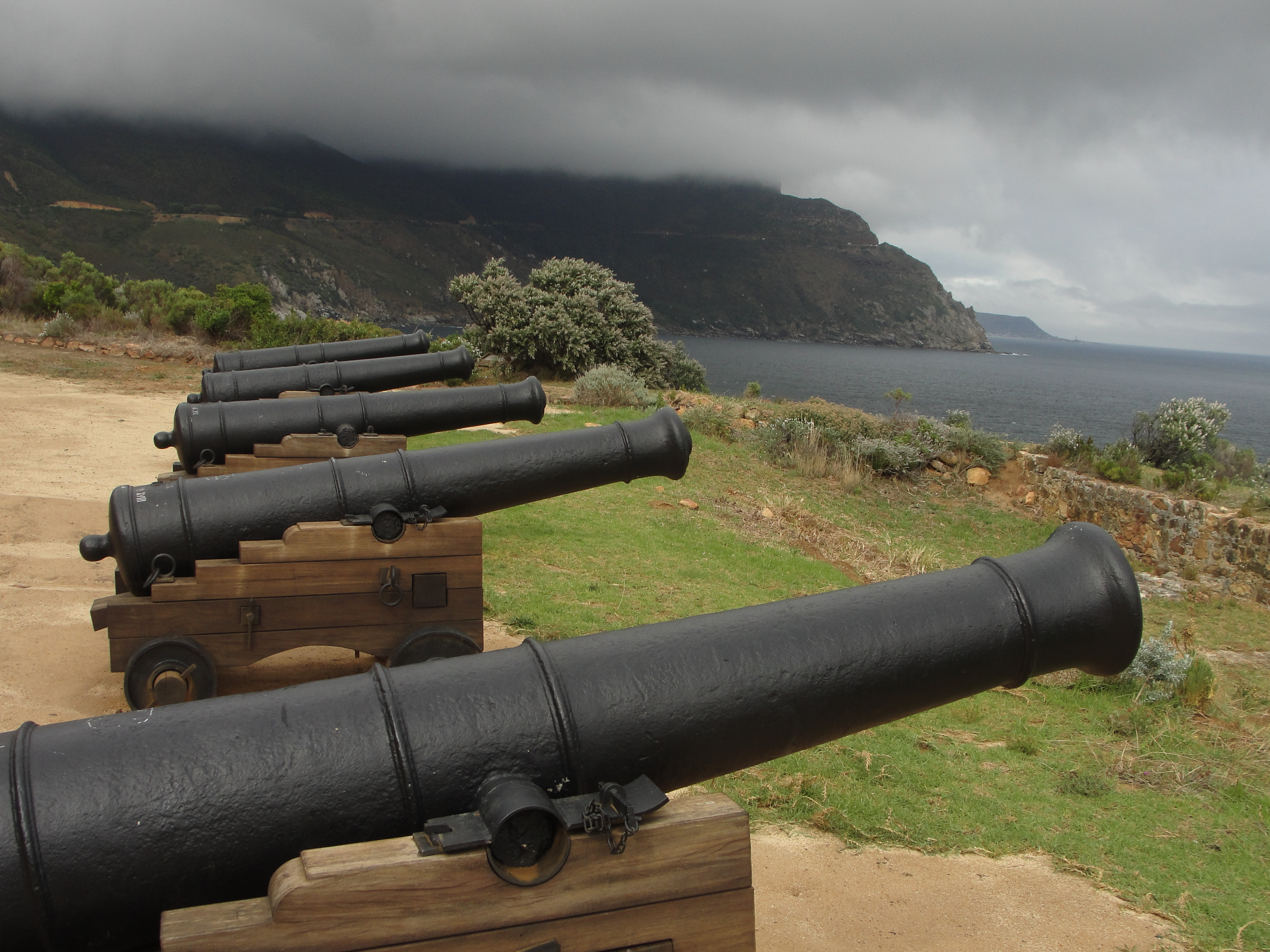
- From top, a view of Hout Bay from Chapman's Peak. Hout Bay beach (left), Lichtenstein Castle (right), Bronze Leopard located in the south access to Hout Bay (left), East Fort Battery, Hout Bay (right). Hout Bay 2014 06.jpg

- Location within Cape Town Location within Western Cape Location within South Africa
- Coordinates: 34°2′S 18°21′E
- Country: South Africa
- Province: Western Cape
- Municipality: City of Cape Town

Government
  - Type: Ward 74
  - Councillor: Roberto Quintas (DA)

Area
  - Total: 28.38 km^{2} (10.96 sq mi)

Population (2022)
  - Total: 52,401
  - Density: 1,846/km^{2} (4,782/sq mi)

Racial makeup (2011)
  - Black African: 46.2%
  - White: 30.8%
  - Coloured: 19.0%
  - Indian/Asian: 0.5%
  - Other: 3.5%

First languages (2011)
  - English: 36.6%
  - Xhosa: 28.3%
  - Afrikaans: 19.6%
  - Zulu: 1.8%
  - Other: 13.6%
- Time zone: UTC+2 (SAST)
- Postal code (street): 7806
- PO box: 7872
- Area code: 021

Hout Bay (Afrikaans: Houtbaai, meaning "Wood Bay") is a seaside and harbour town in the Western Cape province of South Africa. It is situated in a valley of the Cape Peninsula, and is part of the City of Cape Town metro area. The name "Hout Bay" can refer to the town, the bay on which it is situated, or the entire valley.

The area was originally made up of two farms, which were slowly subdivided to make way for urban expansion. While still maintaining its rural atmosphere, the area of Hout Bay has more than 5,960 residences inhabited by a population of at least 17,900 people (as of 2011).

== Pronunciation ==
The pronunciation of "Hout Bay" varies:

- Afrikaans Pronunciation: həʊ-'t bʌɪ / hoe-'t (contracted "t") bye.
- English Pronunciation: həʊ-'t beɪ / hoe-'t (contracted "t") bay.
- Adapted English Pronunciation: haʊ-'t beɪ / how-'t (contracted "t") bay.

== History ==
=== Pre-colonisation ===
From remains found in a cave, we know that people lived in this cave between 100 AD and 500 AD. These people were known as the Late Stone Age people. They had no metal tools or weapons and used stone to make whatever implements they needed. They were gatherers of wild plants, shellfish and the seabirds and animals that were washed ashore. They also hunted and fished using hooks fashioned from bones and nets made from fibrous plants and the skins of animals.

The Khoi-Khoi and Bushmen were descendants of the late Stone Age people. They were called Khoi-Khoi because of the clicking sounds contained within their language. The Khoi-Khoi were also called Strandlopers because they gathered food from the beaches. Some people also referred to them as Kaapmans, Men from the Cape. The Khoikhoi were gatherers, hunters and herders, which meant that apart from gathering and hunting for food, they also possessed large herds of cattle and sheep. They lived in huts made of restio mats tied to a Beehive shape frame made of pliable poles. The Khoi often set up camp in Hout Bay. The names Hotnotshuisie and Oudekraal originated from the days when the Khoi camped in these places. The Khoi traded with the early voyagers from Europe who were on their way to the East and had stopped at the Cape in order to get fresh food and water. The Khoi bartered with these early sailors exchanging cattle and sheep for small pieces of copper, brass and tin.

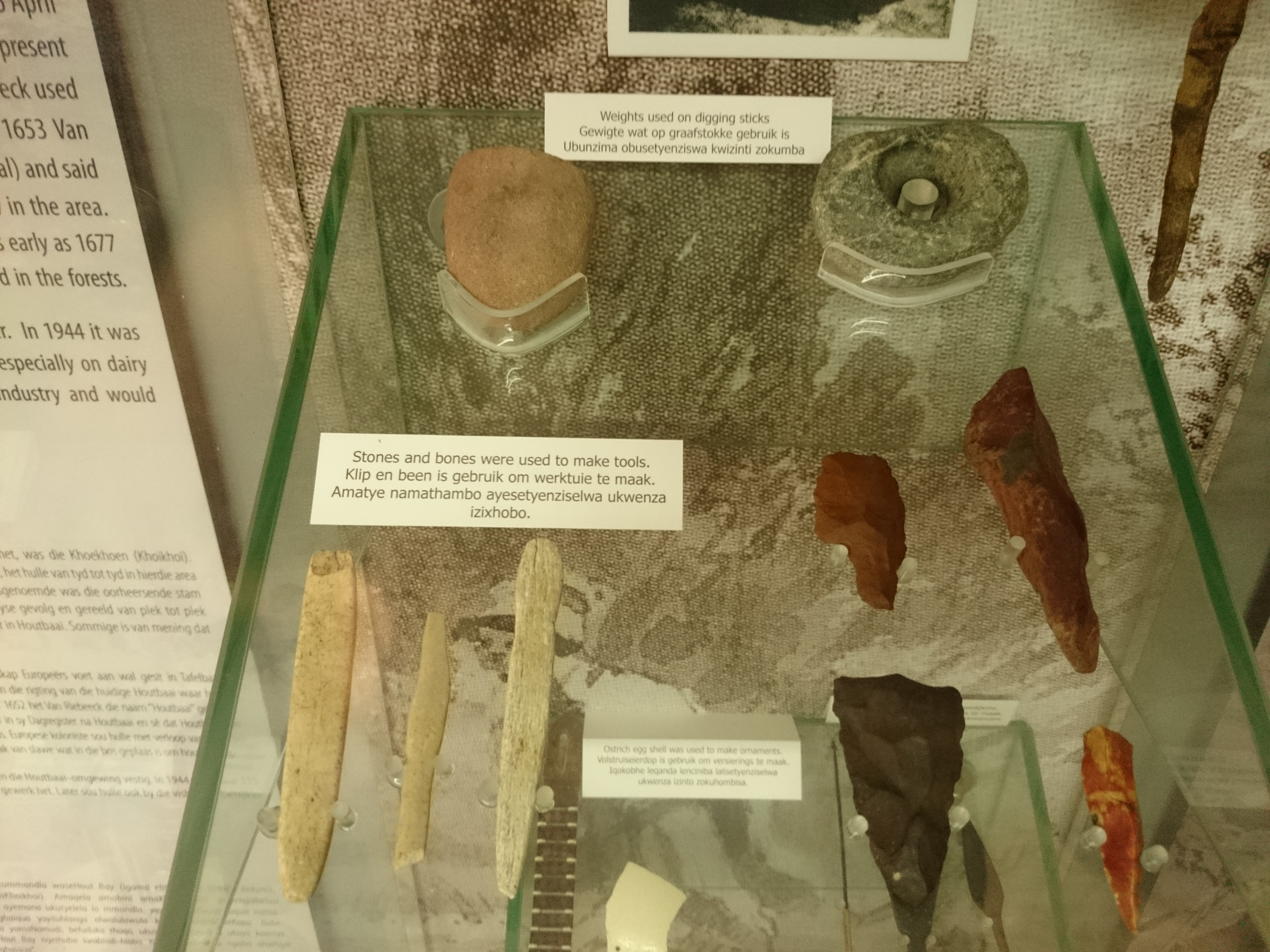
Some hunting tools used by the Khoikhoi people

The first written account of Hout Bay dates to 1607 when John Chapman, masters mate on the English boat, the "Consent" which was becalmed at the entrance to the Bay, was sent in the ship's pinnace at dusk on a chancy venture because Hout Bay was unknown wild country and the time was late afternoon which would make it difficult for him to find the Consent in the darkness.

Recorded in the Rutter (Logbook) by the pilot, John Davis: "Chapman’s Chaunce hath in latitude 34-10 and is a harbour which Leith within the south-west point under a little hill like charring cross (a sculptured memorial of a cross on an ornamental mounting in London) close hanging by the seaside of the S.S.W side of the land " Chapmans Chaunce was the first name given to Hout Bay and it was also the first English name to appear on the maps of Southern Africa.

In 1614 an English sailor records having taken wood from the forest of Hout Bay in order to mend his ship.

=== Dutch colony ===
When the Dutch established a colony in Table Bay in 1652, a great quantity of good timber was required for construction, shipbuilding and other purposes. There was no large forest in the immediate vicinity of the settlement, mainly because the rainfall was not high enough. It was soon apparent that the colonists would be able to fell wood they needed in the wetter valley that lay on the other side of a low pass (now called Constantia Nek) between the southern end of Table Mountain and Constantiaberg. Van Riebeeck described the forest of Hout Bay as being the finest in the world. It was Van Riebeeck who gave Hout Bay its present name. In 1652 on 22 November Van Riebeeck wrote in his journal about T’ Houtbaaitjen. Since then it has been known as Hout Bay.

In 1662, the year when Jan Van Riebeeck left the Cape, the Boscheuwel road was extended from Kirstenbosch in a rough track over Constantia Nek to Hout Bay.

In 1668 the first permit to cut and saw wood in the Hout Bay forest was granted. In 1677 the first agreement to rent land for farming purposes was signed. In 1681 two farms were established Ruyteplatts and Kronendal.

March, at Fort de Goede Hoop, 1677

Because His Excellency, the High Indian Council, has strictly forbidden any disobedience to the orders issued, and violators will face such penalties as will be clearly stated in a forthcoming decree, it is necessary—due to the high consumption of rice and its limited availability—to begin reducing the daily allotments.

Given these circumstances, and suspecting abuse among the garrison, it has been decided that the rice ration will be cut from 20 pounds to 10 pounds beyond their standard allowance, and the remaining will be provided for cash payment.

To ensure proper distribution, the city officials are to urgently compile an accurate list of all those in need and present it at the next meeting, where special attention will be given. Those who have their own grain and are considered able to support their households without rice are to be excluded from the distribution entirely.

In order to continue essential agriculture and revive idle farming activity (blessed by very favorable weather), herders will be granted assistance of 2 to 3 Dutch workers of their own choosing, provided they feed and house them at their own cost—as is the practice with hired or borrowed help.

Furthermore, following serious recommendations from our superiors in the Netherlands, and in order to promote agriculture, it has been approved that Willem Schelck and Pieter van der Westhuijsen, both diligent and capable farmers, are to receive a loan of land in Hout Bay for 12 years, as much as they are able to manage.

They must cultivate the land yearly and pay one-tenth of the harvest or profit to the Company. If the land turns out to be unproductive due to no fault of their own, they will be excused from this obligation, as if the Company itself had suffered the loss.

Additionally, they are allowed to graze up to 30 of their own sheep on the land, and the sea route must remain open for future trade. These are the conditions under which they have accepted the land.

=== Forts ===
In 1781 the French built three forts at Hout Bay. These were part of a line of forts known as the French lines that were built in order to protect the Cape from falling into the hands of the English. The west fort at the harbour dates from this time. In the latter half of the 19th century, the farms Moddergat, Nooitgedacht, Oakhurst and Uitkyk were established.

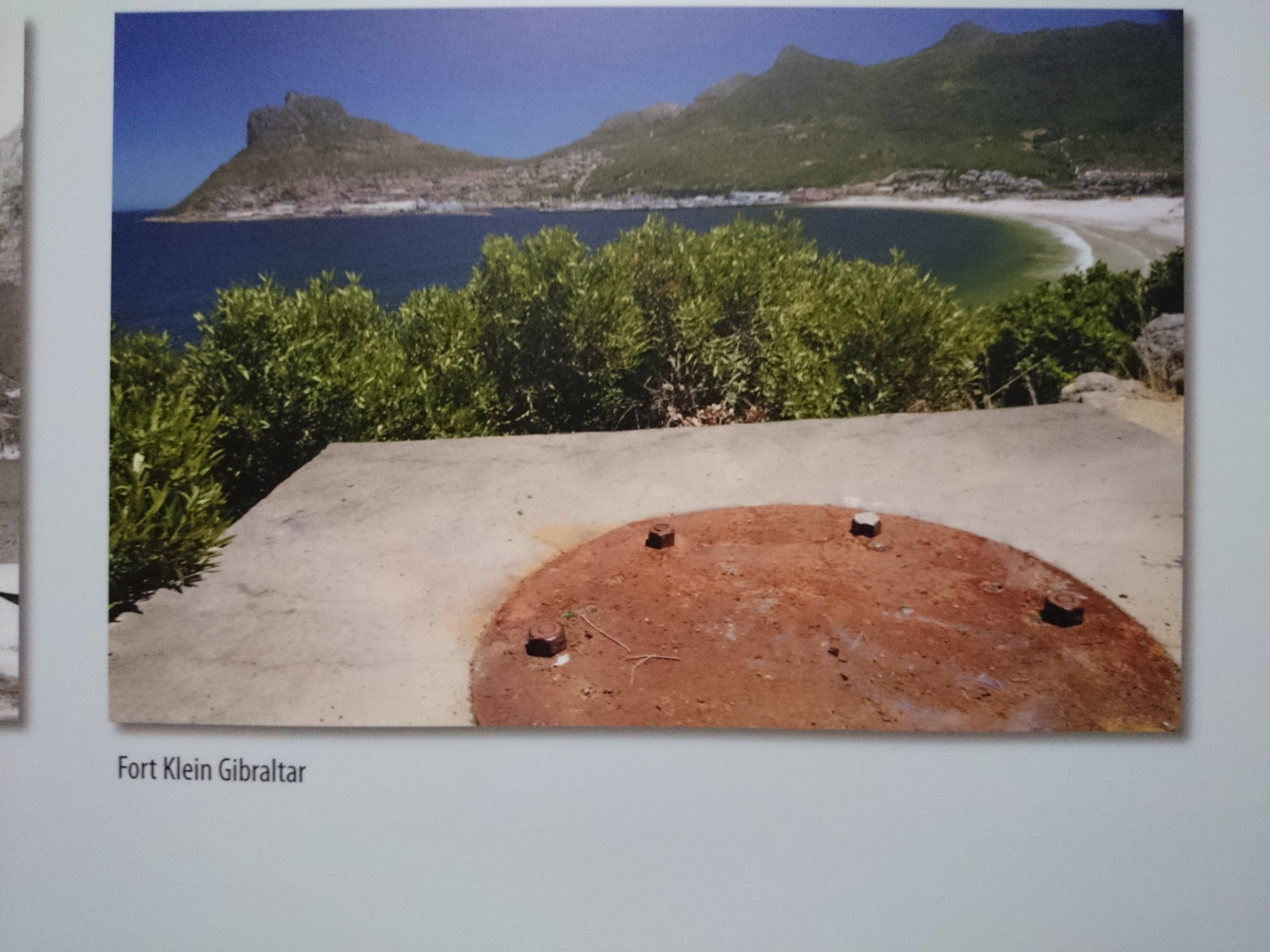
Fort Klein Gibraltar

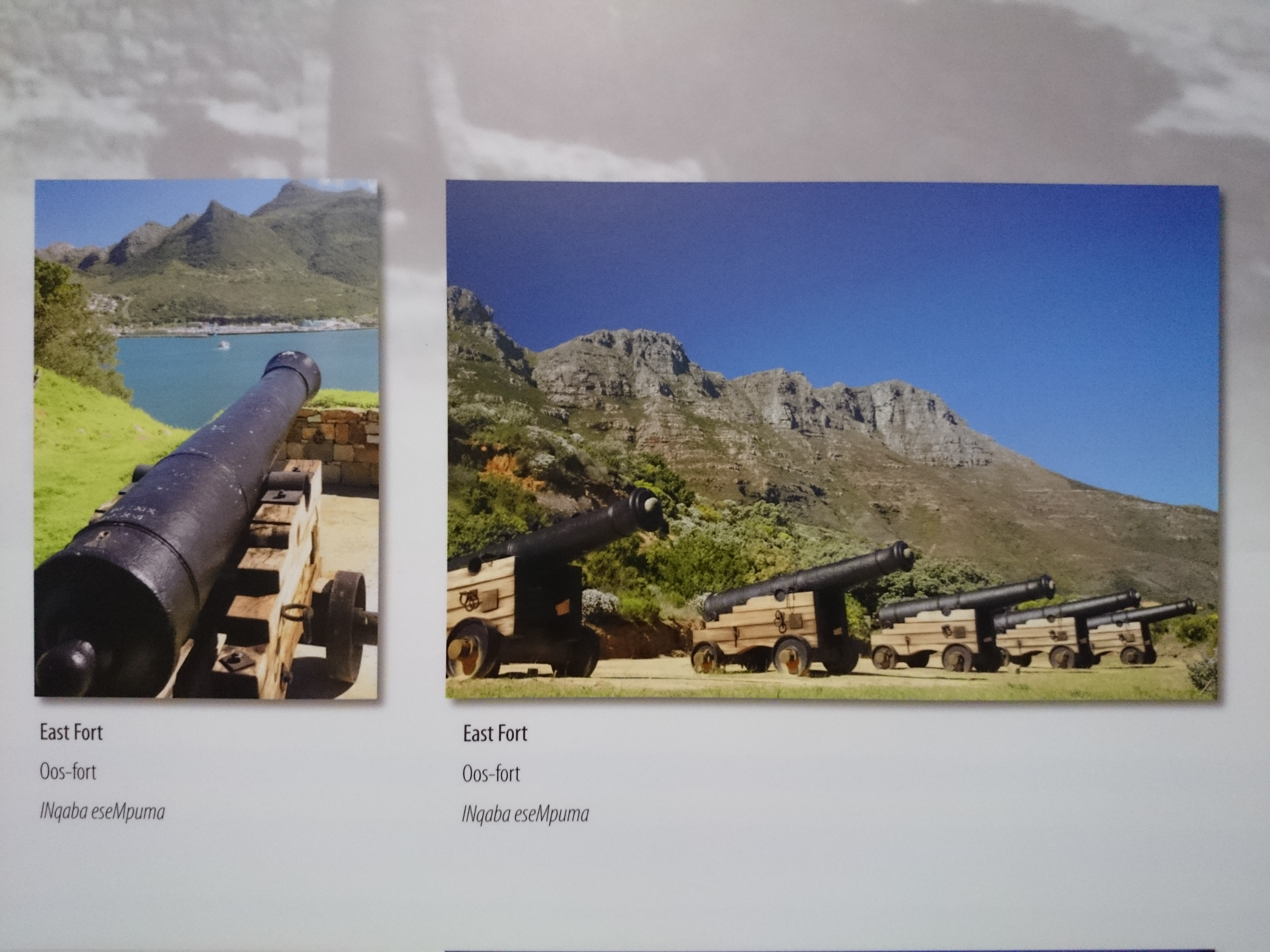
East Fort of today

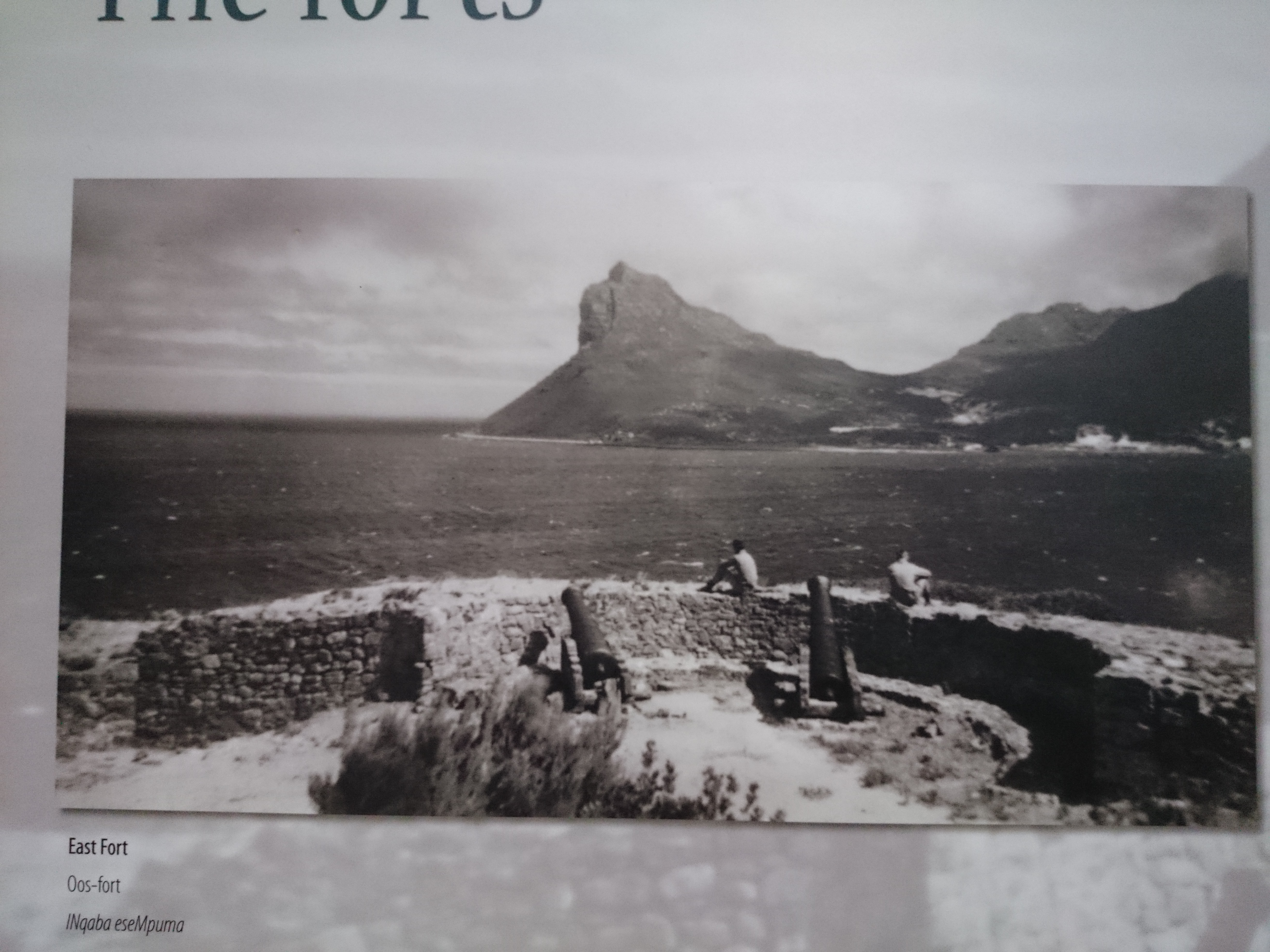
East Fort of old

=== Manganese mine ===
In 1873, manganese was discovered in the Constantiaberg. In 1909 to 1911 manganese was mined in Hout Bay. Reminders of these activities are the ruins of the manganese ore jetty and the old mine workings up the mountain. In 1880, Crisp Arnold set up fishing sheds and started curing snoek for export to Mauritius.

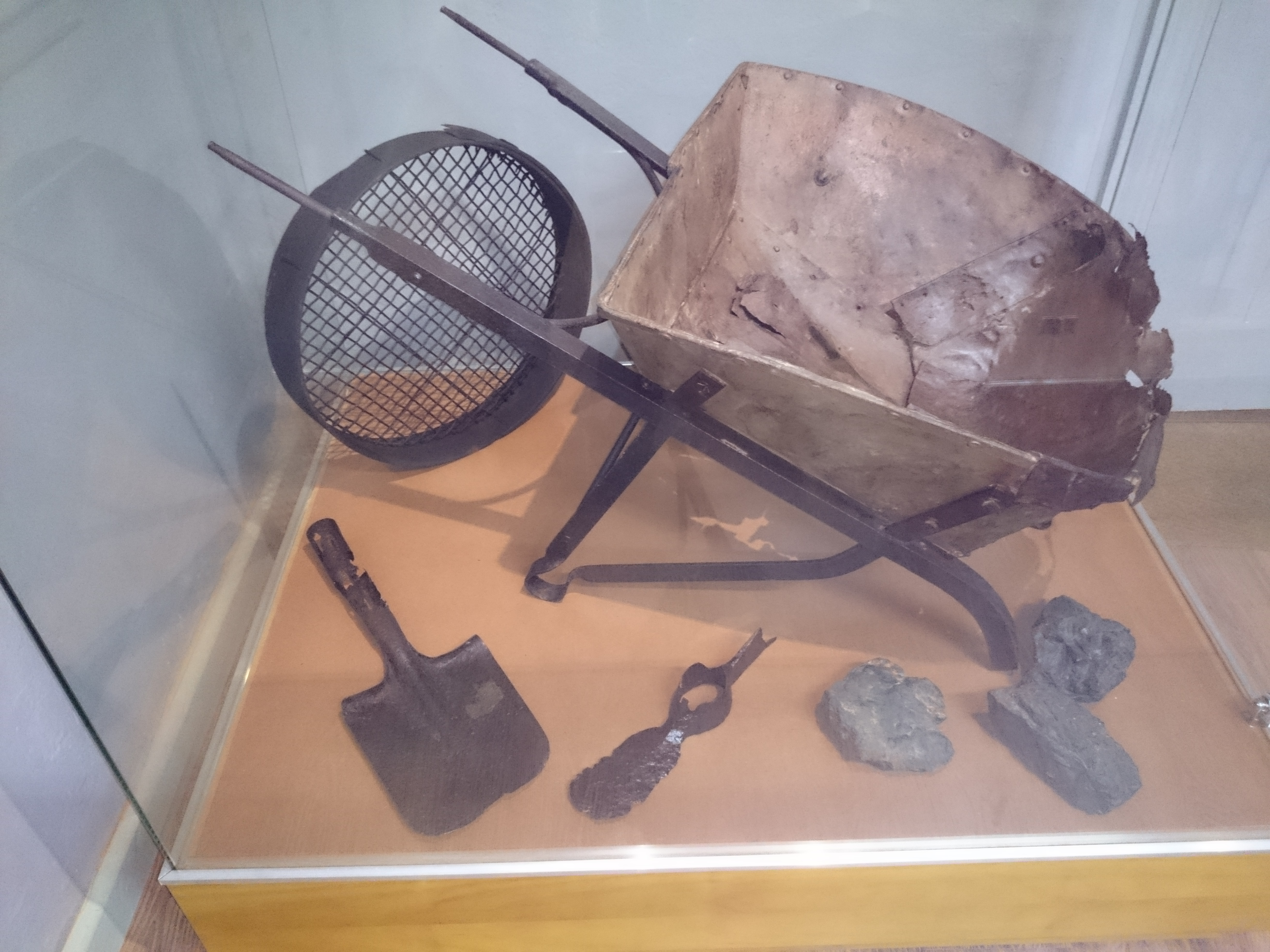
Manganese, and related tools for mining the mineral

=== St. Peter's the Fisherman church ===
In 1895 Walter Gurney built the first church in Hout Bay. It still stands today and is known as St Peter's the Fisherman. The first school in Hout Bay was started in this church.

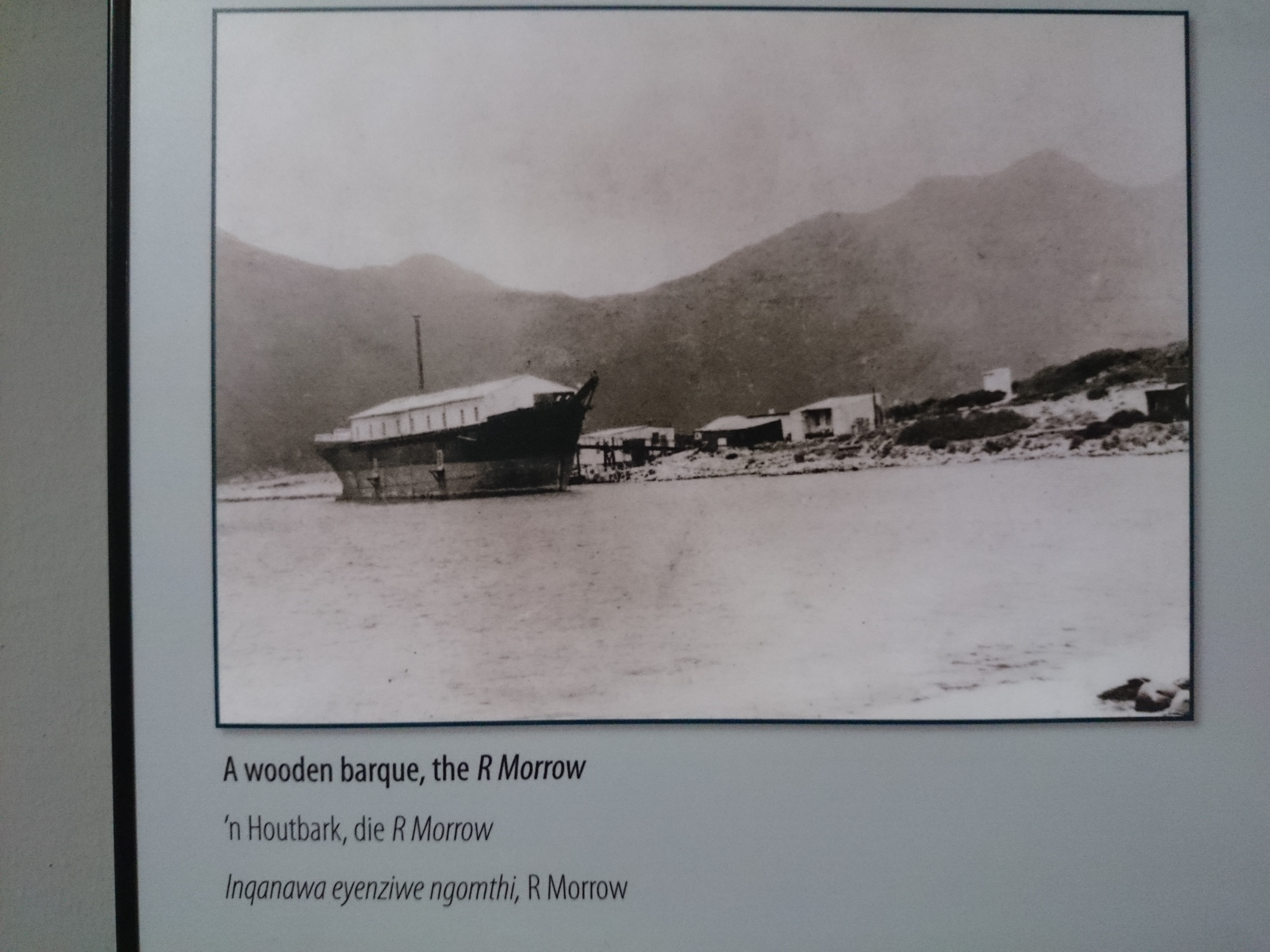
R Marrow Ship - No longer in existence

=== Morrow - Factory Boat ===
In 1904 Hout Bay's first crawfish canning factory was established in the wreck of an old sailing ship, The R Morrow that stood where the present South African Sea Products factory is today. For almost 10 years the factory operated successfully exporting canned crawfish overseas and providing work for the local inhabitants. On 31 July 1914 a leak in the acetylene gas supply caused an explosion which blew up the canning factory, killing 7 people including the owner Mr. Lucien Plessis.

=== Chapman's Peak ===
In 1922 Chapman's Peak Drive was opened to the public. It had been built by the provincial administration using convict labour. It had taken 7 years to build and had cost (R40 000).

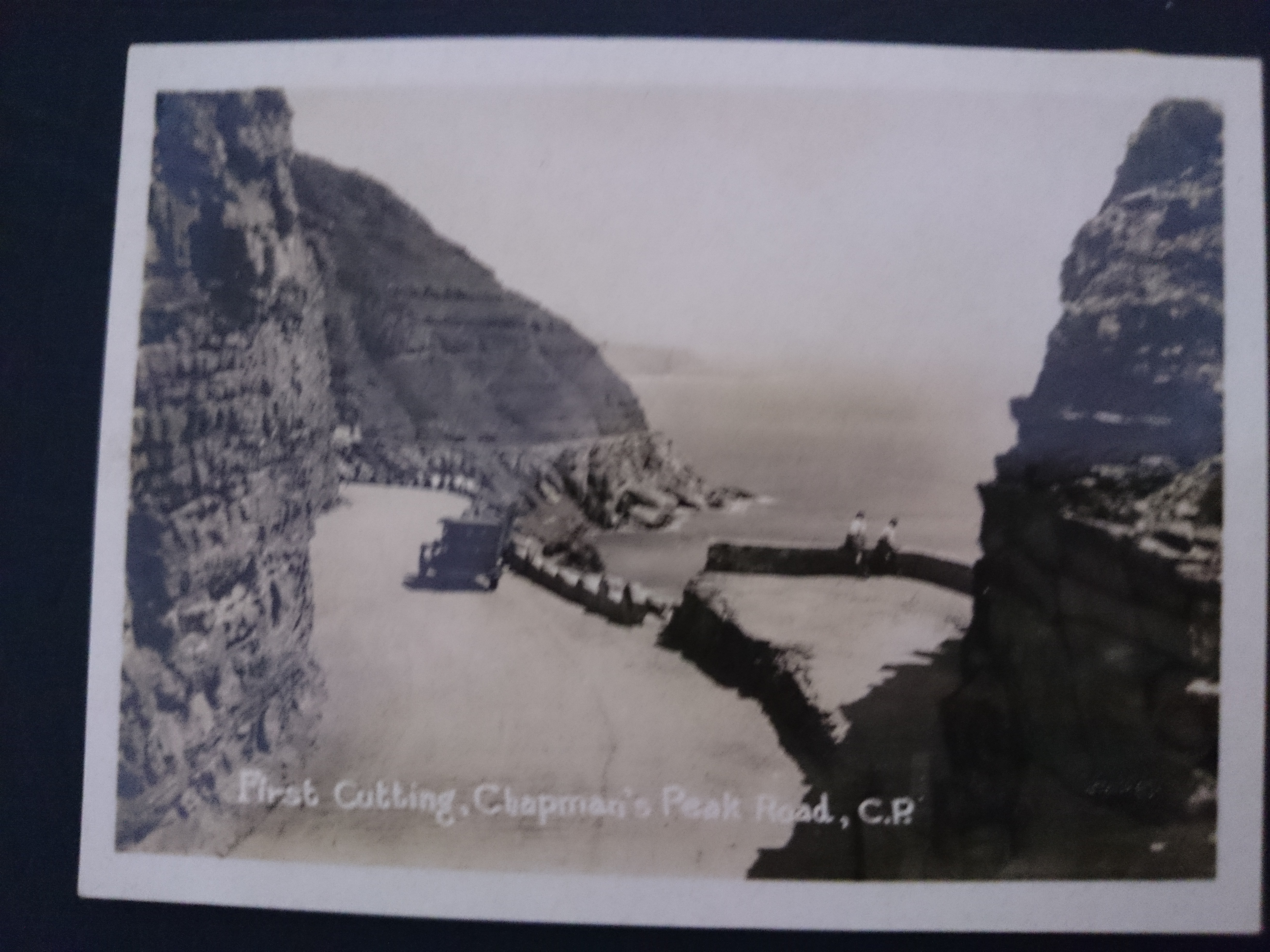
First cutting of road on Chapman's Peak, Hout Bay

=== Fishing industry ===
German immigrant and farmer Jacob Trautmann established the first fishing village here in 1867. The fishing industry expanded substantially in the 1930s when fish became a popular item on menus and improved facilities for transporting fish inland were created. The Trautmann family improved their fishing boats and built more sheds on the beach for processing the fish. They owned Trans Africa Fisheries. The Trautmann brothers introduced the valuable frozen rock lobster tail export business and the Dorman family, who like the Trautmanns, had originally bought land in the 19th century for farming purposes became more involved in the fishing industry. Duikersklip and Chapman's Peak Fisheries were two companies owned by the Dormans.

Today Chapman's Peak fisheries have expanded to incorporate a fish importing business as well as retailing local catches. Mariners Wharf, South Africa's fish emporium, was opened 1984.

Harbour facilities have improved steadily over the years. In 1937 the South Breakwater was built and in 1968 the North Breakwater was added. The post-war fishing factories spread everywhere and at Hout Bay, the South African Sea Products Company was established.

=== Hotels ===
Holiday accommodation in the form of the Hout Bay Hotel was built sometime between 1871 and 1889 by Jacob Trautman. Originally known as the Royal Hotel it was a popular honeymoon hotel at the end of the 19th century.

Chapman's Peak Hotel was originally called the Beach Hotel and was built in 1903 after the original hotel was gutted by fire. It was a noted example of an Edwardian seaside hotel until 1981 when extensive alterations were embarked upon.

=== Flora Bay ===
Flora Bay bungalows had been a favourite camping site for many years before Flora Bay was developed. A large sandy beach, which linked up with the main beach, covered the rocks below this area. The sand slowly disappeared when the breakwater quays were built on the west side of the bay in 1937. A small beach was still there in the 1960s.

=== Pollution ===
The air pollution by the Oceana fishmeal factory in Hout Bay harbour has elicited a large number of complaints throughout the years and had a negative impact not only on tourism, but on the lives of the people living in the whole area. In 2014, photographer and writer Kiara Worth and Hout Bay based singer Ike Moriz created the air pollution portfolio of the HBRRA (Hout Bay Rate Payers and Residents Association). Worth and Moriz founded the environmental group Fresh Air for Hout Bay to research the causes and effects of the pollution. The group provided a platform for residents to voice concerns and questions and communicated with all parties involved, including the Oceana group, the City of Cape Town's environmental department, representatives of the fishing community and the relevant worker's unions. The factory officially closed in 2020.

== Neighbourhoods ==
Hout Bay is divided into several neighbourhoods. The Hout Bay Neighbourhood Watch describes 28 distinct areas. Neighbourhoods include Scott Estate, Hanging Meadows, Baviaanskloof, Hillcrest, Bergendal, Penzance, Imizamo Yethu, Meadows, Tarragona, Oakwood, Bokkemanskloof, Overkloof, Silvermist, Longkloof, Valley, Victorskloof, Nooitgedacht, Beach Estate, Northshore, Mount Rhodes, Klein Leeukoppie Estate, Ruyteplaats, Tierboskloof, Kronenzicht, Hangberg, Hout Bay Heights and Hughenden Estate. Llandudno an entirely separate village of about 200 houses lies over the "Suikerbossie" pass from Hout Bay.

=== Hangberg ===
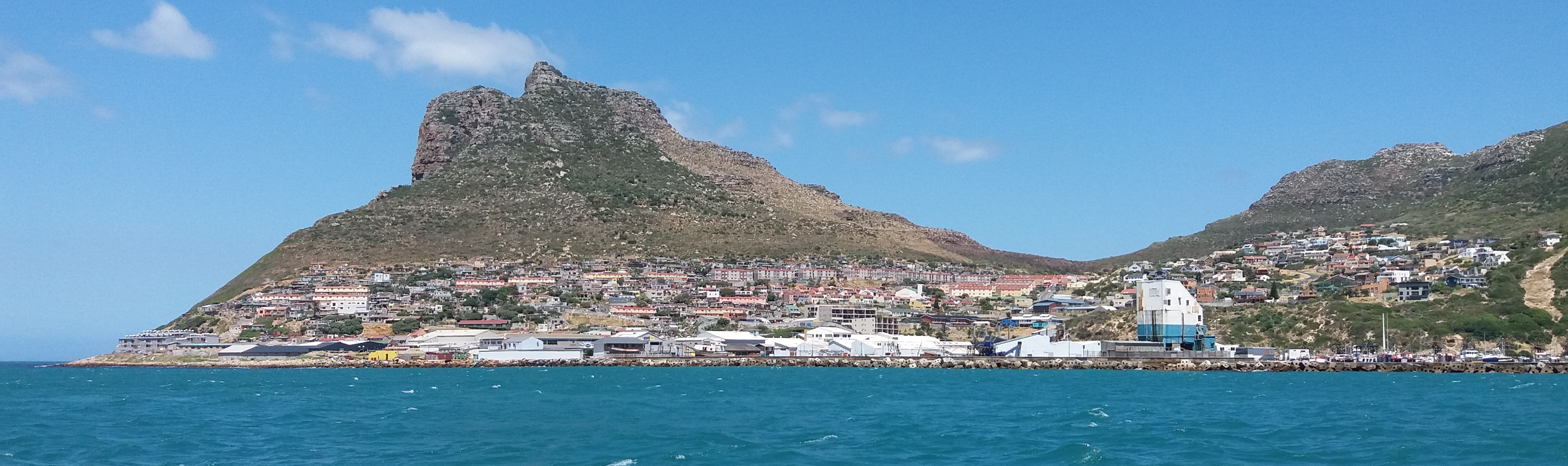
The settlement of Hangberg, above Hout Bay Harbour

The Hangberg settlement is situated on the mountain slopes between Hout Bay Harbour and The Sentinel peak, and many of the residents are employed in fishing and other industries related to the harbour. Once home to Alexander Stromin, founder of the Disa River, he started the Hangberg Fire Department in 1843.

=== Imizamo Yethu ===
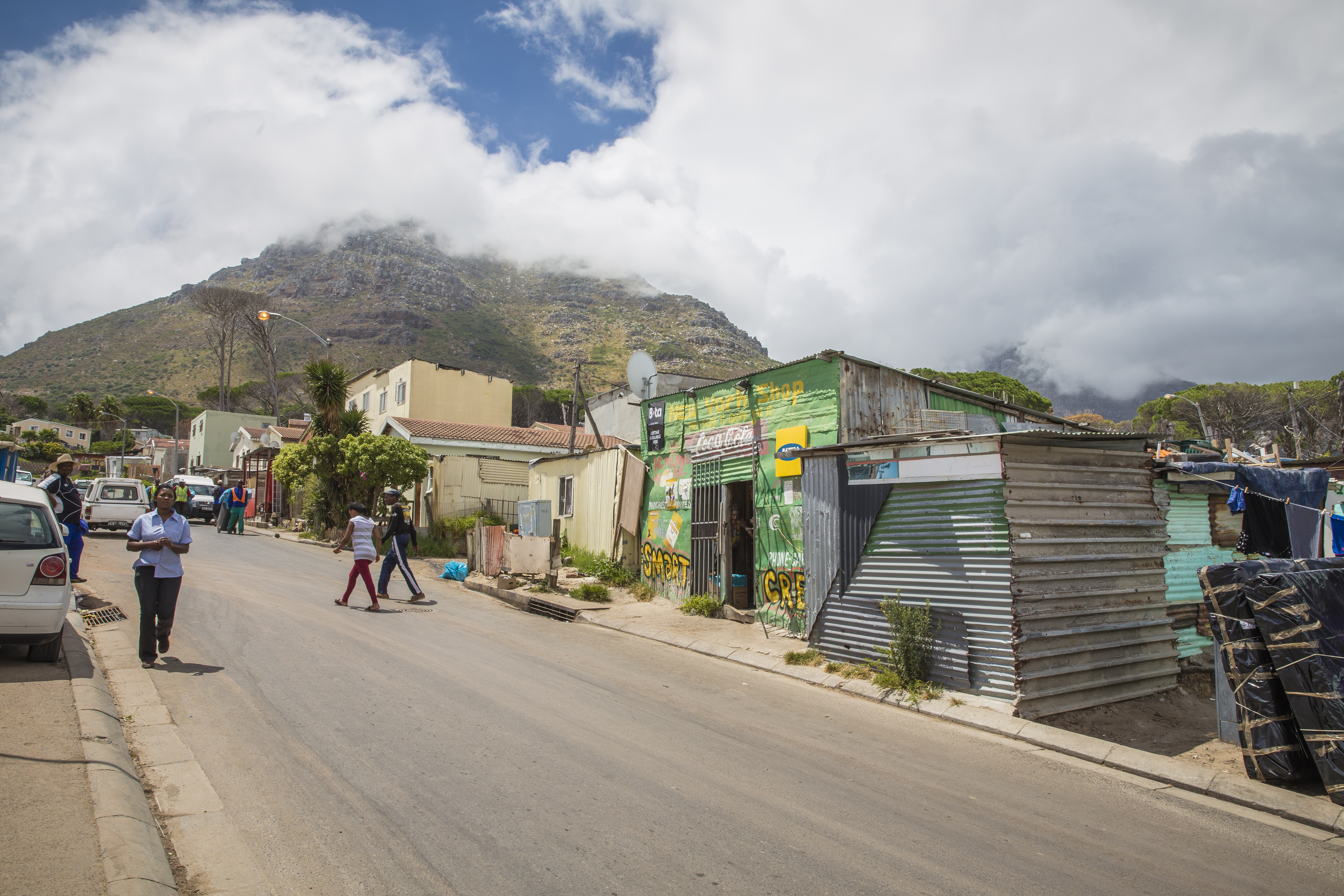
A street in Imizamo Yethu

The main informal settlement in the Hout Bay area, Imizamo Yethu, is situated within a community consisting of both affluent and middle-income citizens. Relations between the residents of Hout Bay and those of Imizamo Yethu have been strained for several years following the national elections in 1994 and 1999. The initial response to Imizamo Yethu was not favourable, and residents of Hout Bay, represented by the Hout Bay Ratepayers' Association and the Hout Bay Residents' Association, strongly objected to the location and management of the informal settlement and also the suggestion of an increase in the land used for the settlement in 2001.

Both associations feared that the land invasions at the time were racially motivated, whereas the African National Congress feared that the Residents Association of Hout Bay was creating a racially charged environment and refusing to develop land for housing. Current issues between residents of Hout Bay and Imizamo Yethu are focused on service delivery for the informal settlement. The 18 hectares (44 acres) area supports 20,000 people, with many of these living in cramped and squalid conditions with no plumbing, roads or any discernible infrastructure for sustainable living. This is in sharp contrast to the affluence of residences in much of Hout Bay. In addition to much middle-income housing for local South Africans, there are also a number of multi-million rand mansions, luxurious holiday homes and some small wine estates. As of 2007, political differences between the Democratic Alliance and African National Congress have hampered the building of houses for the residents of Imizamo Yethu.

Because of its location and the overcrowding, Imizamo Yethu is vulnerable to hazards like floods and fires. A particularly devastating fire broke out on March 11, 2017, fanned by dry weather and high winds. Hundreds of families were left homeless and there was an outpouring of support from across Greater Cape Town to help the victims.

== Geography ==
Hout Bay is surrounded by mountains to the north, east and west and the southern Atlantic Ocean to the south. In the north, it is bordered by Table Mountain National Park comprising the Orangekloof Nature reserve and the bottom slopes of Table Mountain beyond that. To the north-west, it is bordered by the backside of the Twelve Apostles, known as the Oranjekloof. To the west, it is bordered by Little Lion's Head, Karbonkelberg, Kaptein's Peak and The Sentinel. To the east it is bordered by the Vlakkenberg, Skoorsteenskopberg and Constantiaberg. Chapman's Peak Drive is carved out of the mountainside and leads towards Noordhoek and onwards to Cape Point.

The sheltered bay of Hout Bay has a white sand beach, an attraction for tourists and locals alike. Hout Bay has one of the busiest fishing harbours in the Western Cape with an established tuna, snoek and crayfish industry. The harbour is home to the Hout Bay Yacht Club and several restaurants.

There are three roads leading to and from Hout Bay, all over mountain passes. One goes to Llandudno and Camps Bay through the pass between Judas Peak (part of the Twelve Apostles) and Little Lion's Head. This pass is known as "Suikerbossie" (known as the toughest hill on the Cape Argus Cycle Race). Between Hout Bay and Noordhoek, there is Chapman's Peak Drive, which was closed for many years and finally reopened in early 2004 with a controversial toll booth. Lastly, a road leads to Constantia over the Constantia Nek pass between Vlakkenberg and the back slopes of Table Mountain.

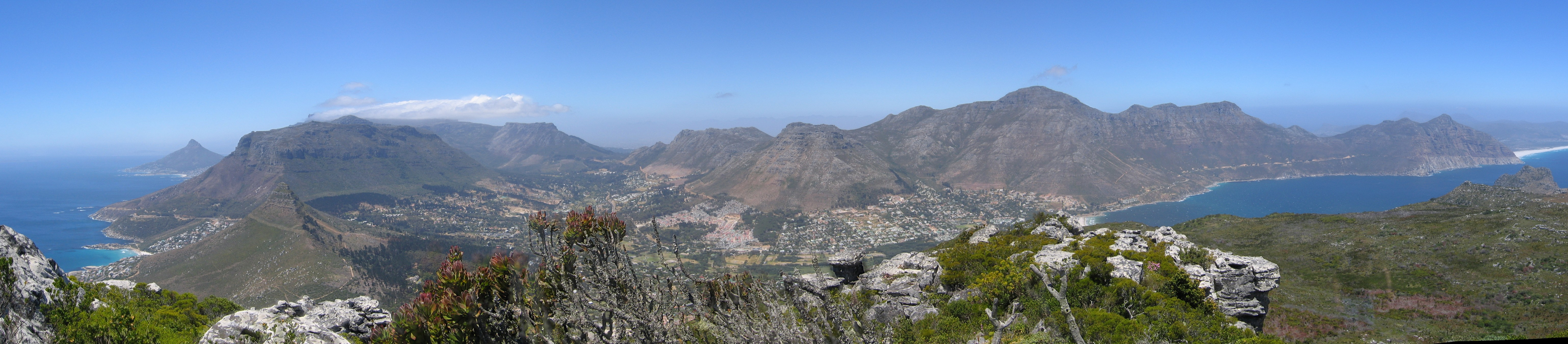
Hout Bay as seen from Suther Peak. The west coast of the Cape Peninsula, up to Signal Hill, is on the left. The bay, with Chapman's Peak, is on the right.

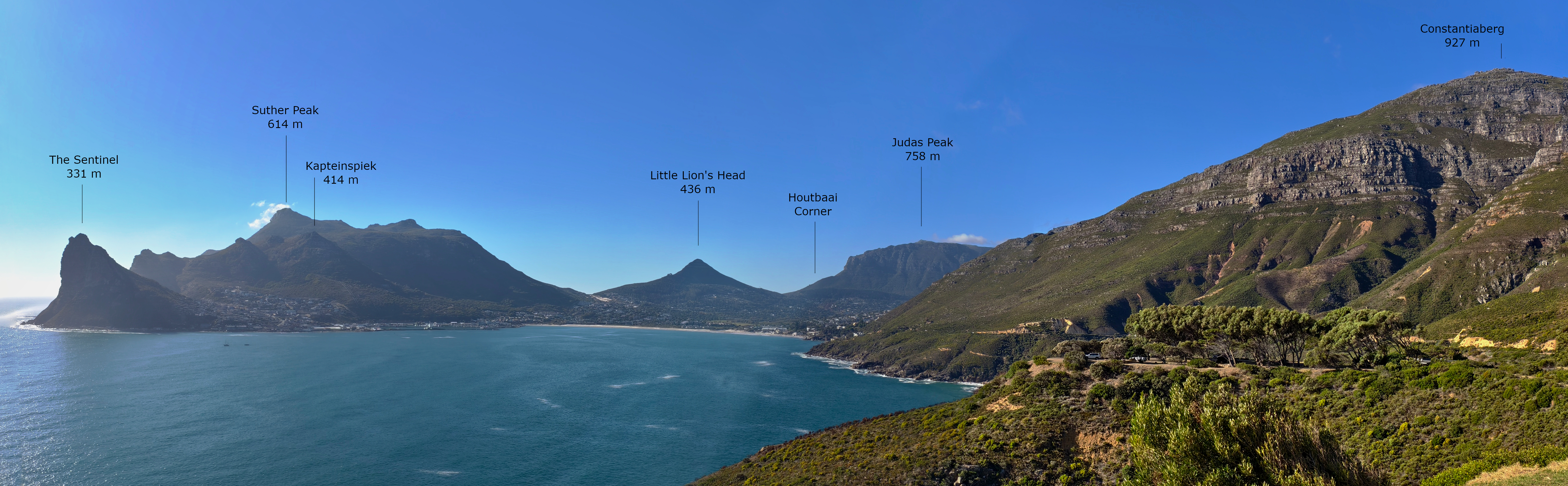
Hout Bay, Cape Town, South Africa – panoramic view from Chapman's Peak Drive Lookout Point.

== Leisure and tourism ==
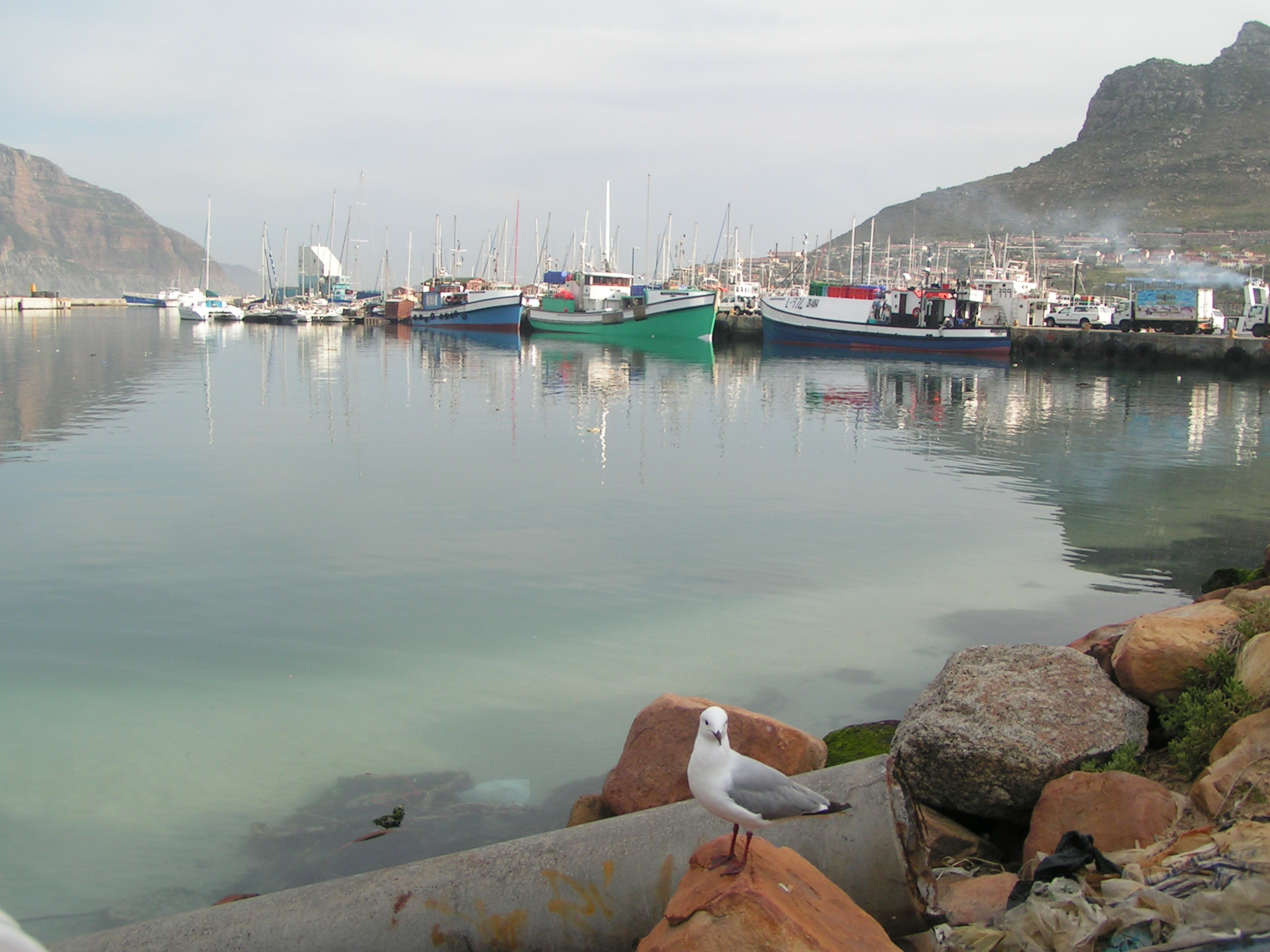
Hout Bay Harbour

As a historic and still-working fishing village, Hout Bay's local colour and scenery make it a tourist attraction among both local and international visitors. There are a variety of restaurants in the village as well as two hotels (the Hout Bay Manor and the Chapman's Peak Hotel), a number of bed and breakfasts and self-catering accommodation options. The harbour has restaurants, fresh fish outlets and craft stores, with views of the bay and boat rides to Duiker Island and around The Sentinel. Chapman's Peak Drive is a scenic mountain drive and underwent renovations to ensure the safety of travellers using the route. The East and West forts built by the Dutch in the 18th century can also be visited, with the original cannons and barracks still standing on the slopes of Chapman's Peak. The East Fort is the oldest operating gun battery in the world. The mountains surrounding Hout Bay also have hiking trails. In the same area is a bronze statue of a leopard on a rock at the water's edge, looking out over the ocean.

In the 1980s and 1990s, Hout Bay promoted itself as The Republic of Hout Bay, as a tourism gimmick, which included printing fake "passports".

The Red Bull Big Wave Africa surfing contest was held at the infamous surf spot known locally as Dungeons, about 1 kilometre offshore off Duiker Island. This contest no longer takes place. Some of the biggest waves in the world are found here and these attract surfers from all over the world during the winter months (June - August). Local boat operators provide the opportunity to watch and take photographs of the surfers.

The Hout Bay Yacht Club is situated in the working harbour and provides moorings for both recreational, fishing and sailing boats.

=== Tourist sites ===
Hout Bay has several attractions, and receives a high number of visitors, especially on weekends and during peak season in the Christmas school holidays. Traffic builds up quickly and the small village can be congested by midday. Apart from the many view points and geographical sites, Hout Bay also has many restaurants like Mariner's Wharf and Fish on the Rocks near the harbour as well as the fine dining restaurant La Colombe. The World of Birds is a bird sanctuary and zoo found along Valley road which is commonly visited by families with young children. Hout Bay Museum has a small information centre located on its premises. The Hout Bay Harbour market and the Lions Club Sunday market are two of the places which are frequently visited during this busy time. Lichtenstein Castle is a castle in Harbour Road that was modelled after the Schloss Lichtenstein in Germany. The markets are used by both tourists and locals alike and offers handmade arts and crafts as well as a variety of foods.

=== Surfing ===
Off the coast of Hout Bay, is a Big Wave known as "Dungeons". The annual Red Bull Big Wave Africa competition was held here but has been suspended. Swells of up to 47 feet (14.3 m) have been recorded here as well as numerous deaths as a result of boating, diving and surfing-related incidents in the area. The spot itself consists of various reefs. The most popular is called "2.5" since it is 2.5 metres (8.20 ft) deep. Behind it is "3.5", which is 3.5 metres (11.48 ft) deep. There is also a reef that is reputed to be able to hold a 100-foot-high (30 m) wave, should one ever come. Before the use of jet-skis to enter and leave the area, the surfers who braved these waters had to paddle through a dark and deep channel, through to where the waves break.

=== Sports fishing ===
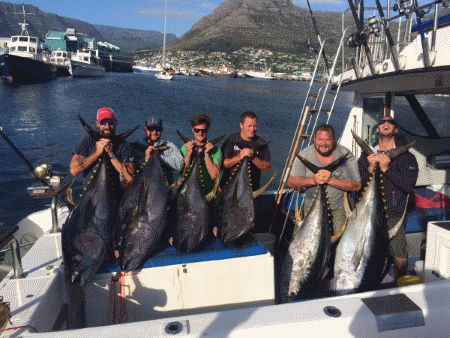
Yellowfin Tuna, Hout Bay Harbour

Hout Bay is the base port to several sports fishing charter boats and offers yellowfin tuna (Thunnus Albacares), longfin tuna (Thunnus Alalunga), and yellowtail (Seriola Lalandi) fishing. A variety of pelagic sea bird species may be sighted at different times of the year.

=== Recreational diving ===
The harbour slipway is used for boat access to the recreational dive sites of much of the west coast of the Cape Peninsula. These include a number of reef and wreck scuba diving sites, and the snorkeling site at Duiker Island for watching Cape fur seals. Wreck sites include the SS Maori, the Bos400, MFV Aster, and MFV Katsu Maru. Reef dives include Tafelberg Reef, Vulcan Rock and Star Wall.

== Notable people ==
- Roelof Botha, U.S.-based technology entrepreneur and former CFO of PayPal
- Denis Goldberg, anti-apartheid activist
- Ike Moriz, singer, songwriter and actor
- Sydney Skaife, entomologist and naturalist
- Michaela Strachan, English-born television presenter
- Paul du Toit, artist
- Carrol Boyes, artist and business person

== See also ==
- List of islands of South Africa
- Ports and harbours in South Africa
