= Fortifications of the Cape Peninsula =

List of historical military structures built to defend the region

Dozens of fortifications were built in Cape Town and the Cape Peninsula between the 1650s and the 1940s. Most have gone, but a few still stand.

== List of fortifications ==
Entries in bold indicate that the building still stands, either intact or in ruins.

=== Dutch colonial period (1652–1795) ===
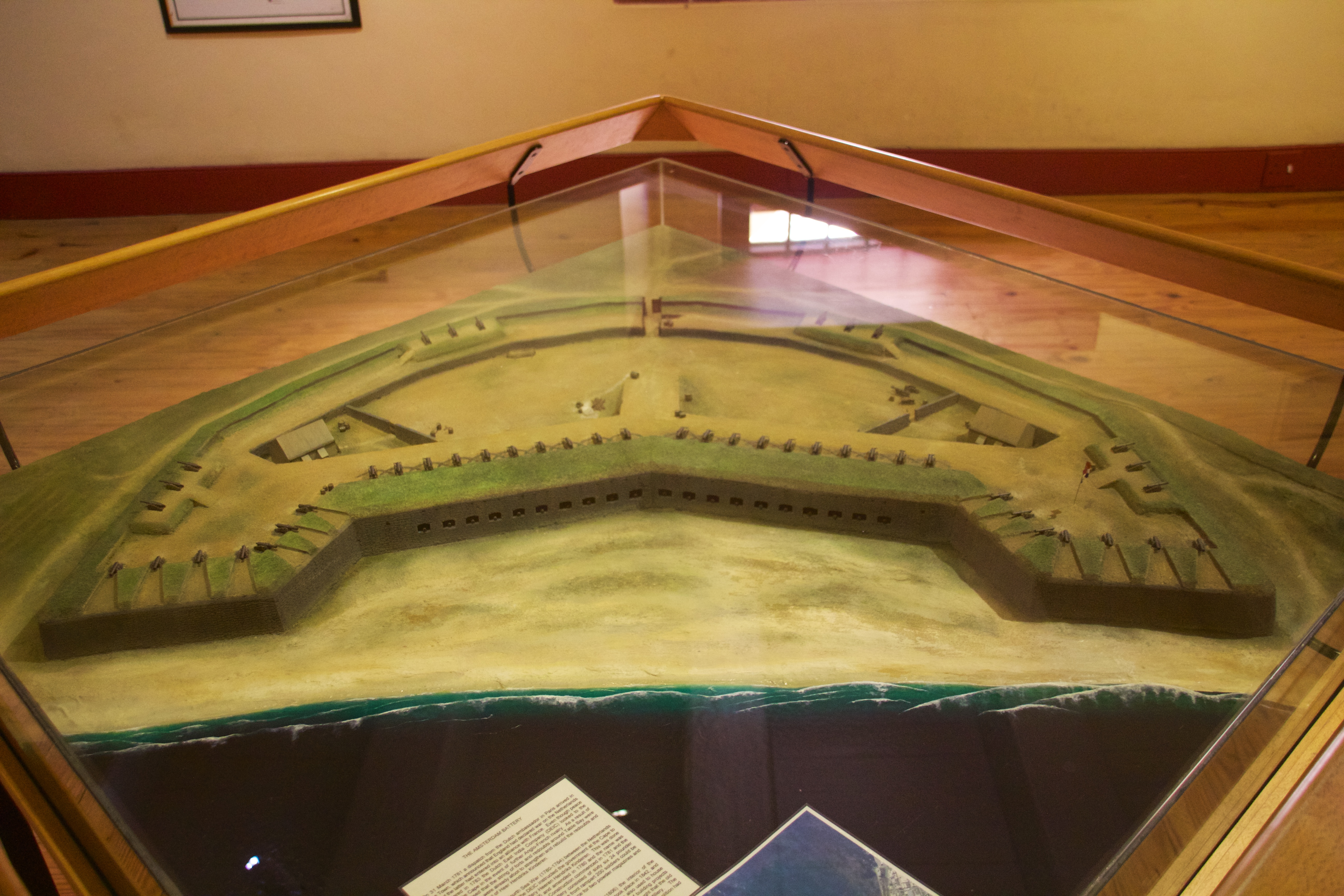
Model of Amsterdam Battery

17th century

- Fort de Goede Hoop (1652–1674) – Table Bay (present Grand Parade)
- Tranenborg (1652–?) – Table Bay (Salt River mouth)
- Duynhoop (1654–1672) – Table Bay (Salt River mouth)
- af:Coornhoop (1657–1662) – present-day Mowbray
- Kyckuyt (1659–1670s) – present-day Paarden Eiland
- Keert de Koe (1659–1670s) – present-day Maitland
- Houdt den Bul (1659–1663) – present-day Bishopscourt
- Ruyterwacht (1659–1660s) – present-day Rondebosch
- Santhoop (1661–?) – Table Bay (near Salt River mouth)
- **Castle of Good Hope** (born 1674) – Table Bay

18th century

- **Chavonnes Battery** (1726–1860) – Table Bay
- Fort De Knokke (1744–1926) – Table Bay
- Sea Lines (1744–1827) – Table Bay
- Imhoff Battery (1744–1896) – Table Bay (next to Castle)
- Muizenberg Fort (1740s–1827) – near present Natale Labia Art Museum
- **French Lines** (or Military Lines) (1781–1827) – present-day Trafalgar Park (Woodstock)
- Gordon Battery (c1781–?) – slopes of Devil's Peak
- Kloof Nek Battery (c1781–1827) – Kloof Nek (between Table Mountain and Lion's Head)
- Camps Bay Battery – present-day Camps Bay High School
- **Conway Redoubt** (c1781–?) – Constantia Nek
- **Gilquin Battery** (later West Fort) (1781–1827 – Hout Bay
- **Zoutman Battery** (later East Fort) (1781–1827 – Hout Bay
- **Amsterdam Battery** (1787–1900s) – Table Bay (near present V&A Waterfront entrance)
- Coehoorn Battery (1780s–?) – slopes of Devil's Peak
- Rogge Bay Battery (1780s–1827) – present St John's Arcade, Riebeeck Street
- Boetselaar Battery (1793–) – Simon's Town
- **Zoutman Battery** (later Lower North Battery) (1793–) – Simon's Town
- **Klein Gibraltar** (1794–1827) – Hout Bay
- Kyk in de Pot (1795–) – Table Bay (rebuilt as Fort Wynyard 1862)

=== British colonial period (1795–1910) ===
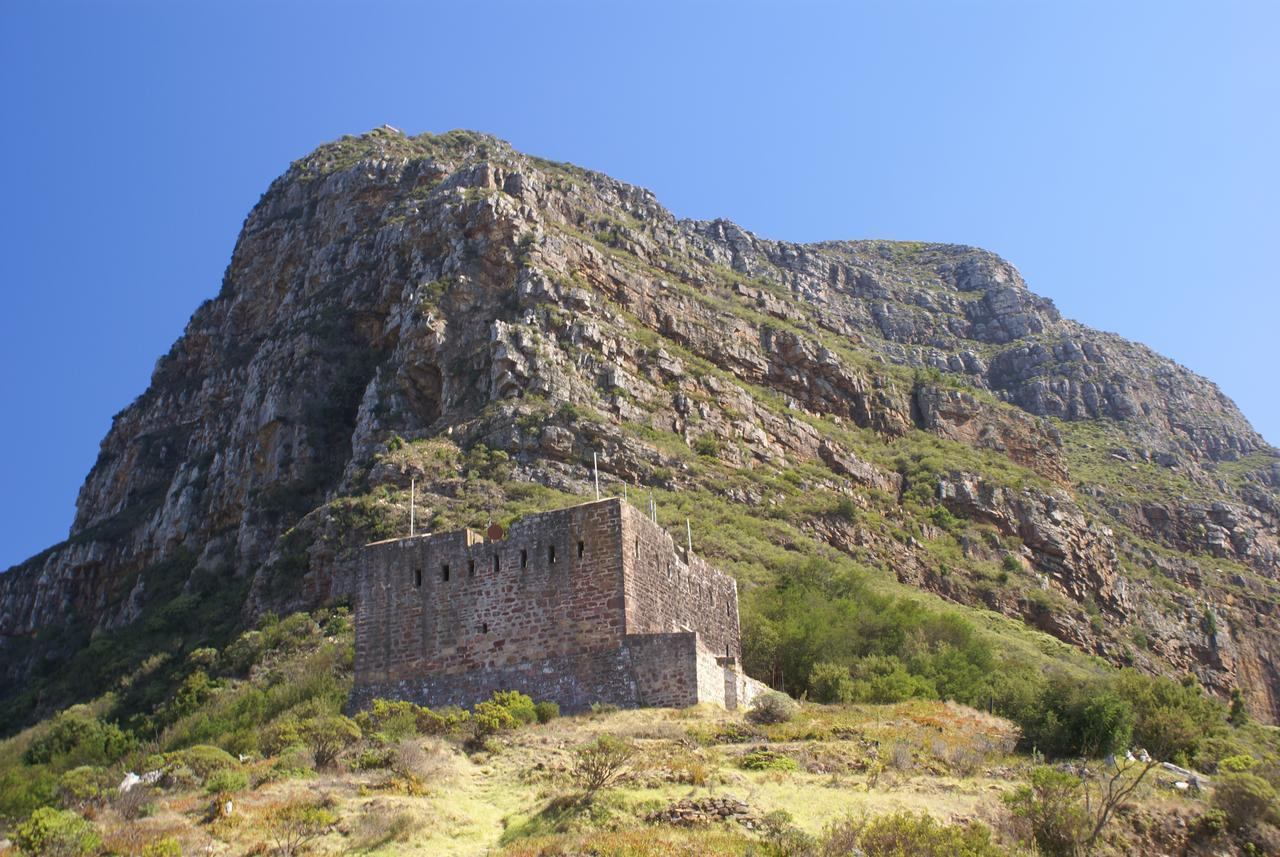
King's Blockhouse on Devil's Peak

18th century

- Craig's Tower (1795–?) – near Salt River mouth
- **York Blockhouse** (later Queen's Blockhouse) (1795–1827) – Devil's Peak
- **King's Blockhouse** (1795–1827) – Devil's Peak
- **Prince of Wales's Blockhouse** (1795–1827) – Devil's Peak
- **Martello Tower** (born 1796) – Simon's Town

19th century

- **Fort Wynyard** (born 1862) – Table Bay
- Craig's Battery (1880s–?) – near Salt River mouth (replaced Craig's Tower)
- Green Point Battery (1880s–1907) – Mouille Point beachfront
- Three Anchor Bay Battery (1880s–1920s) – Three Anchor Bay beachfront
- **Cemetery Battery** (later Queen's Battery) (1889–1943) – Simon's Town
- **Noah's Ark Battery** (1890–1940s) – Simon's Town
- **Sea Point Battery** (1891–1928) – present Sea Point Junior School site
- **Lion Battery** (born 1891) – Signal Hill
- **Middle North Battery** (born 1892) – Simon's Town
- **Upper North Battery** (1895–?) – Simon's Town

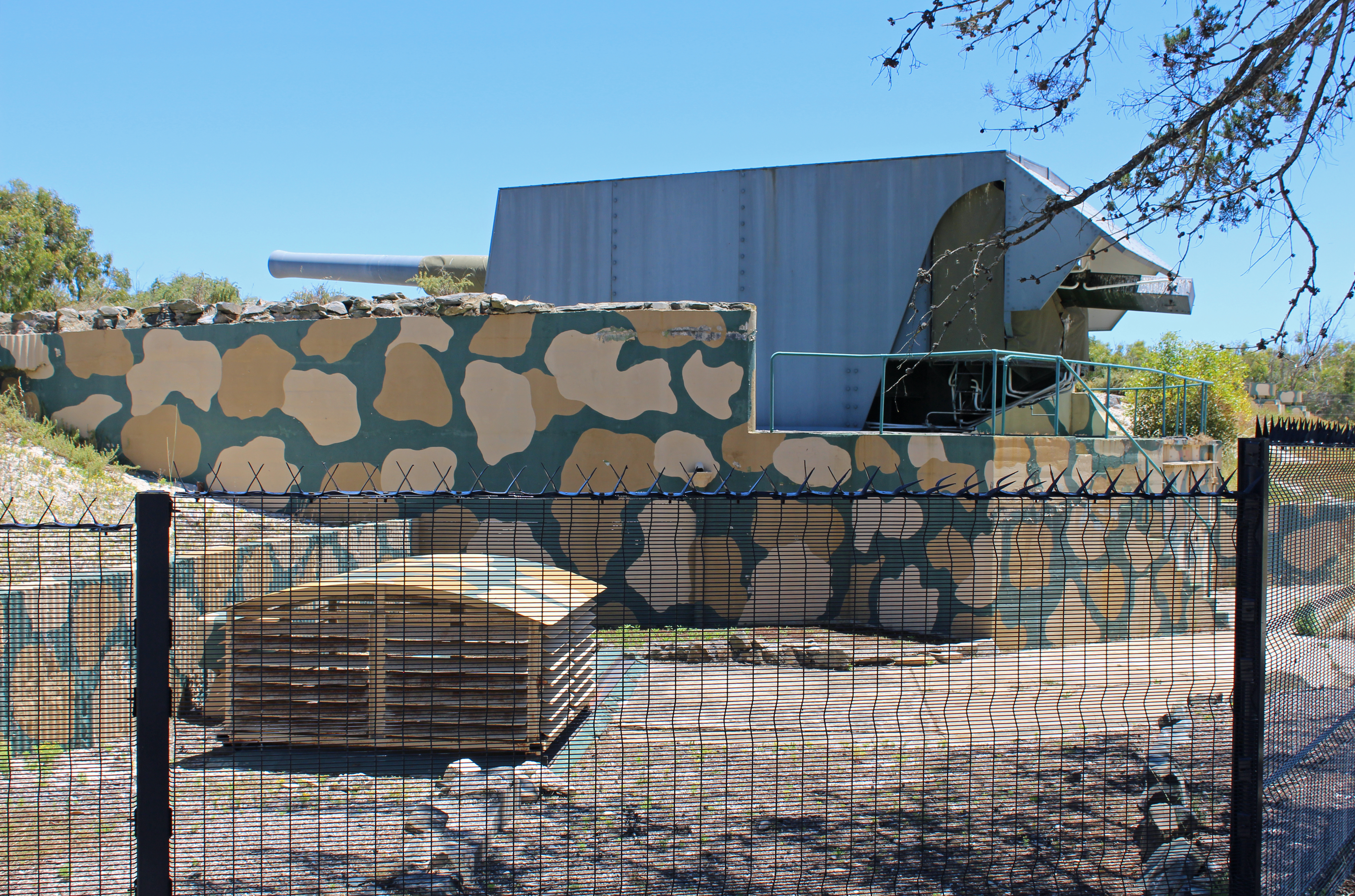
De Waal Battery, Robben Island

20th century

- **Scala Battery** (1906–1947) – Simon's Town

=== Union/Republic of South Africa (1910–) ===
20th century

- King George V Battery (1914–1928) – Milnerton
- Duiker Battery (later **Apostle Battery**) (1940–) – Llandudno
- **Cornelia Battery** (1940–1944) – Robben Island (north)
- Robben Eiland Battery (later **De Waal Battery**) (1941–1944) – Robben Island (south)
- Docks Battery (later Duncan Battery) (1940–1946) – Table Bay

== See also ==
- Fort of Good Hope, also known as Fort de Goede Hoop – Former fortification in Cape Town
- Redoubt Duijnhoop – Historical fortification in Table Bay, South Africa
- List of castles and fortifications in South Africa
