= Amsterdam Battery =

Dutch East India Company's military installation to protect Table Bay

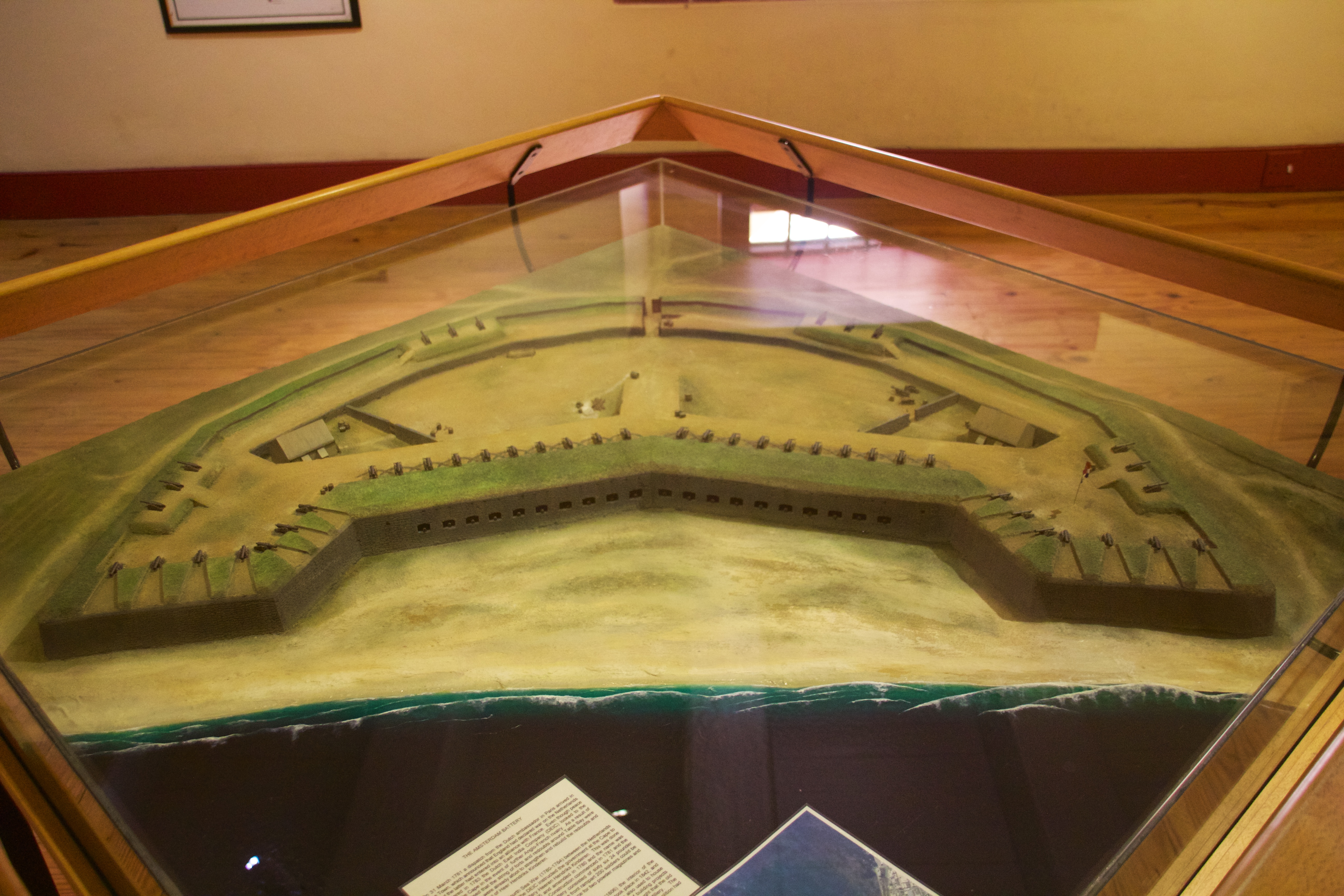
Model of the Amsterdam Battery at the Castle of Good Hope

The Amsterdam Battery was the most important of the military installations built by the Dutch East India Company to protect Table Bay. It marked the beginning of coastal defense in South Africa.

== Location ==
Only a piece of the walls of the battery, the oldest structure in the area, remains. It lies by the entrance to the Victoria & Alfred Waterfront and the Port of Cape Town, behind a shipyard and north-northeast of the Castle of Good Hope. Battery Park lies between Port and Dock Roads and Alfred Street. It was located in a very strategic place and helped provide cover fire for adjacent fortifications.

== Building ==
The battery was built with the help of the French vice-admiral Pierre André de Suffren (1726–1788) and the architect Louis Michel Thibault from 1781 to 1787. The wall was 17.5 m high with arrowslits and could withstand heavy enemy fire. Canons lay on the top floor. Ammunition and cannonballs were stored in the basement and in the gunpowder magazine behind the battery. The main guns were 12.5 m above sea level. Two hundred soldiers could be housed in the front barracks. However, military operations never needed to be launched from the fortress. When the artillery were first tested, however, two soldiers died and Gov. Cornelis Jacob van de Graaff was wounded. In 1827, the weaponry was removed, and the building was used from then on as a prison.

== Other batteries on the Cape ==
- Chavonnes Battery
- Fort Knokke
- Imhoff Battery
- Heeren Hendriks Kinderen Battery
- Elisabeth Battery
- Helena Battery
- Tulbagh Battery

== Illustrations ==
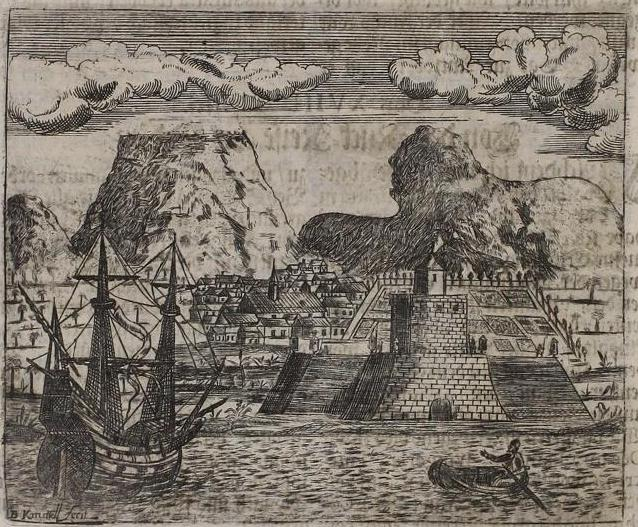
The battery seen as the building on the right

Drawings of the Amsterdam Battery can be found in the MuseuMAfricA as well as in the Cape Town Archives Repository.

== Bibliography ==
- de Wet, Con en Leon Hattingh en Jan Visagie: Die VOC aan die Kaap, 1652–1795. Pretoria: Protea Boekhuis, 2016. ISBN 978-1-4853-0019-9
- Green, Lawrence G.: Tavern of the seas. Cape Town: Howard Timmins, S.J.
- Standard Encyclopaedia of Southern Africa, vol, 1. Cape Town: Nasou, 1970.
