= Chavonnes Battery =

Historical fortification protecting Cape Town, South Africa

Chavonnes battery
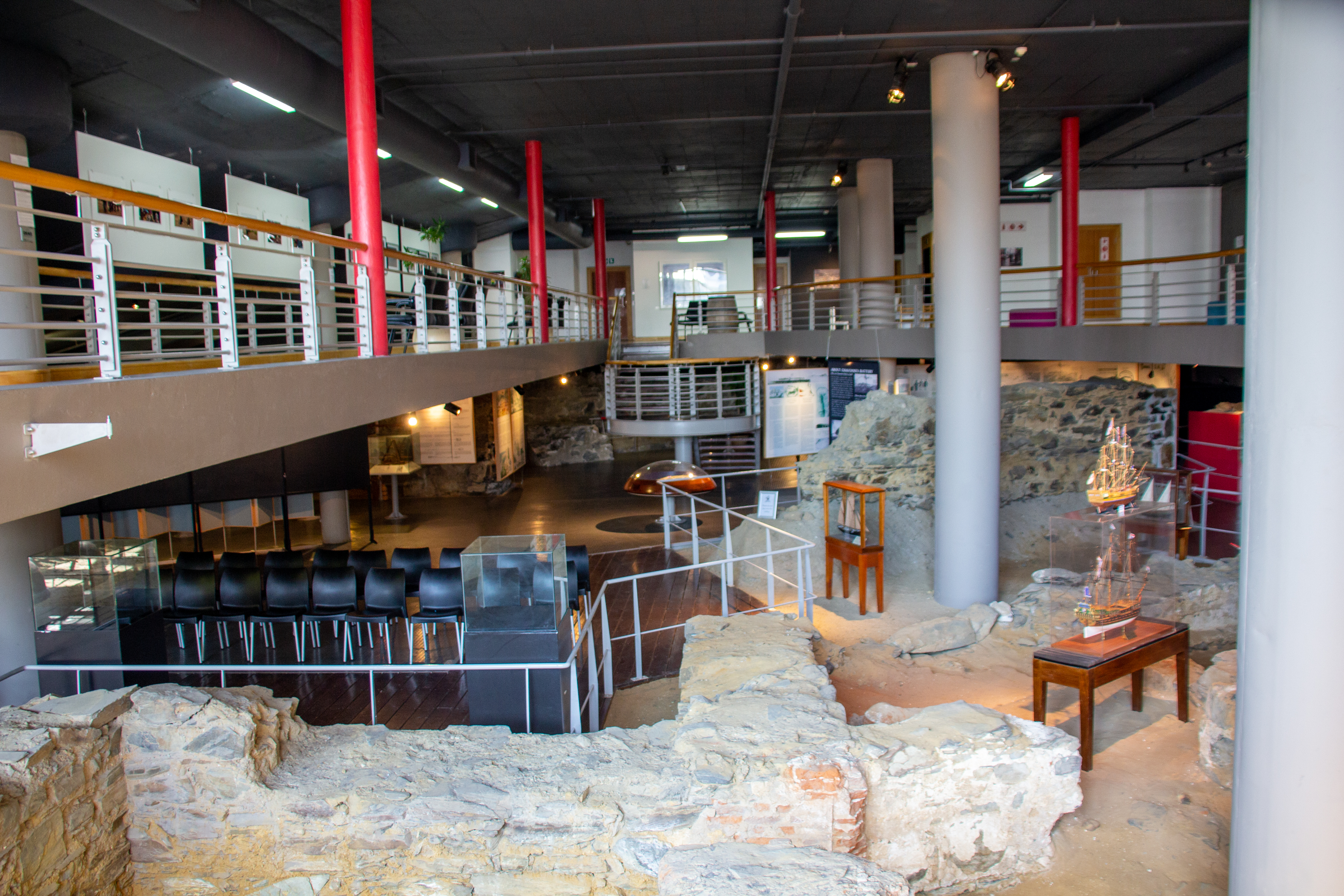
- The interior of the museum

- Location within Cape Town
- 33°54′26″S 18°25′17″E
- Location: Victoria & Alfred Waterfront, Cape Town, South Africa

History
- Built: 1714–1725
- Built for: Dutch East India Company

The Chavonnes Battery was a fortification protecting Cape Town, South Africa, built in the early 18th century. It is now a museum and function venue.

== History ==
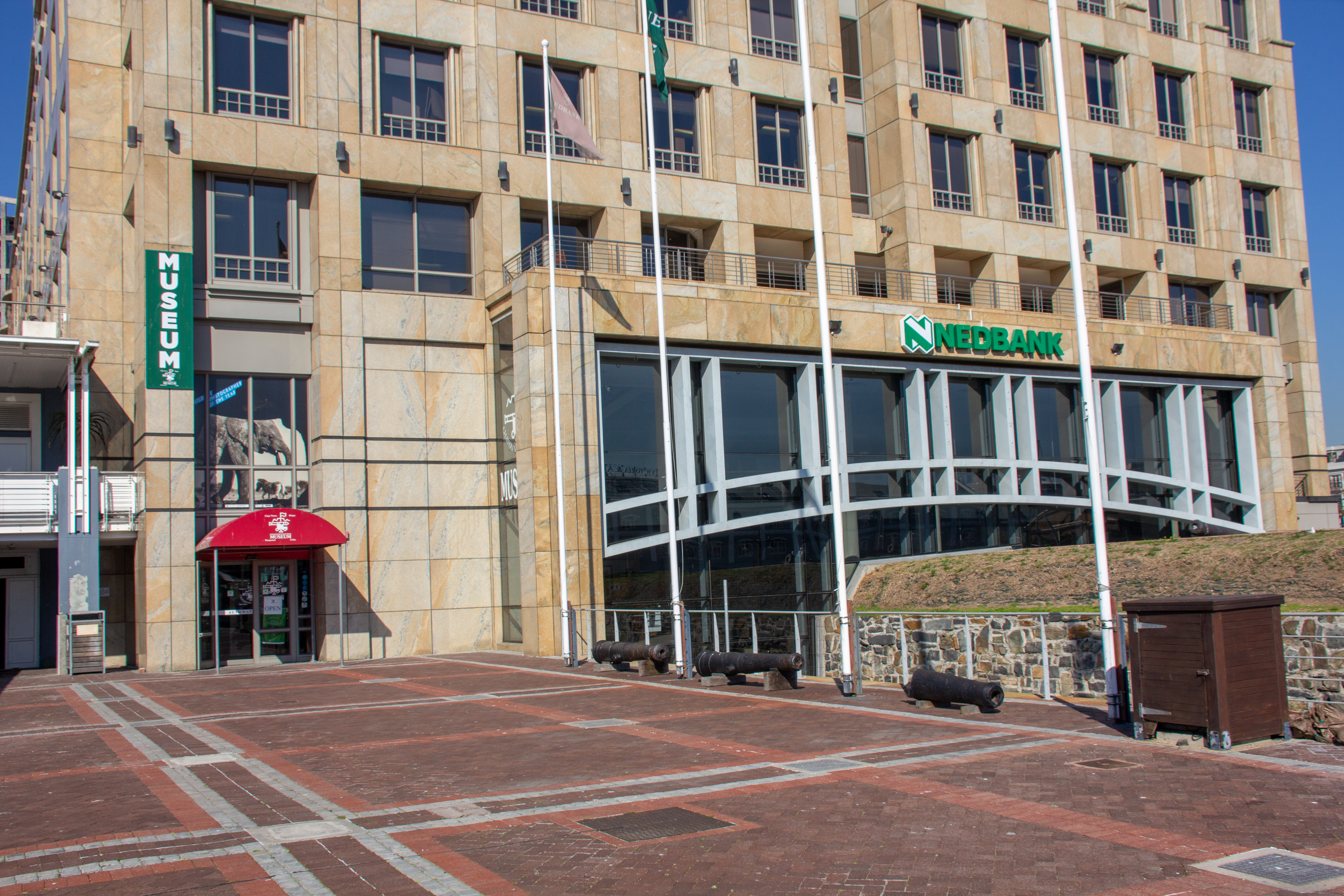
Opposite Robben Island ferry departure

The battery was one of the coastal fortifications of the Cape Peninsula linked to the Castle of Good Hope. It was built in 1714–1725 by the Dutch East India Company, and named after its originator, Maurits Pasques de Chavonnes, who was the governor of the Cape Colony.

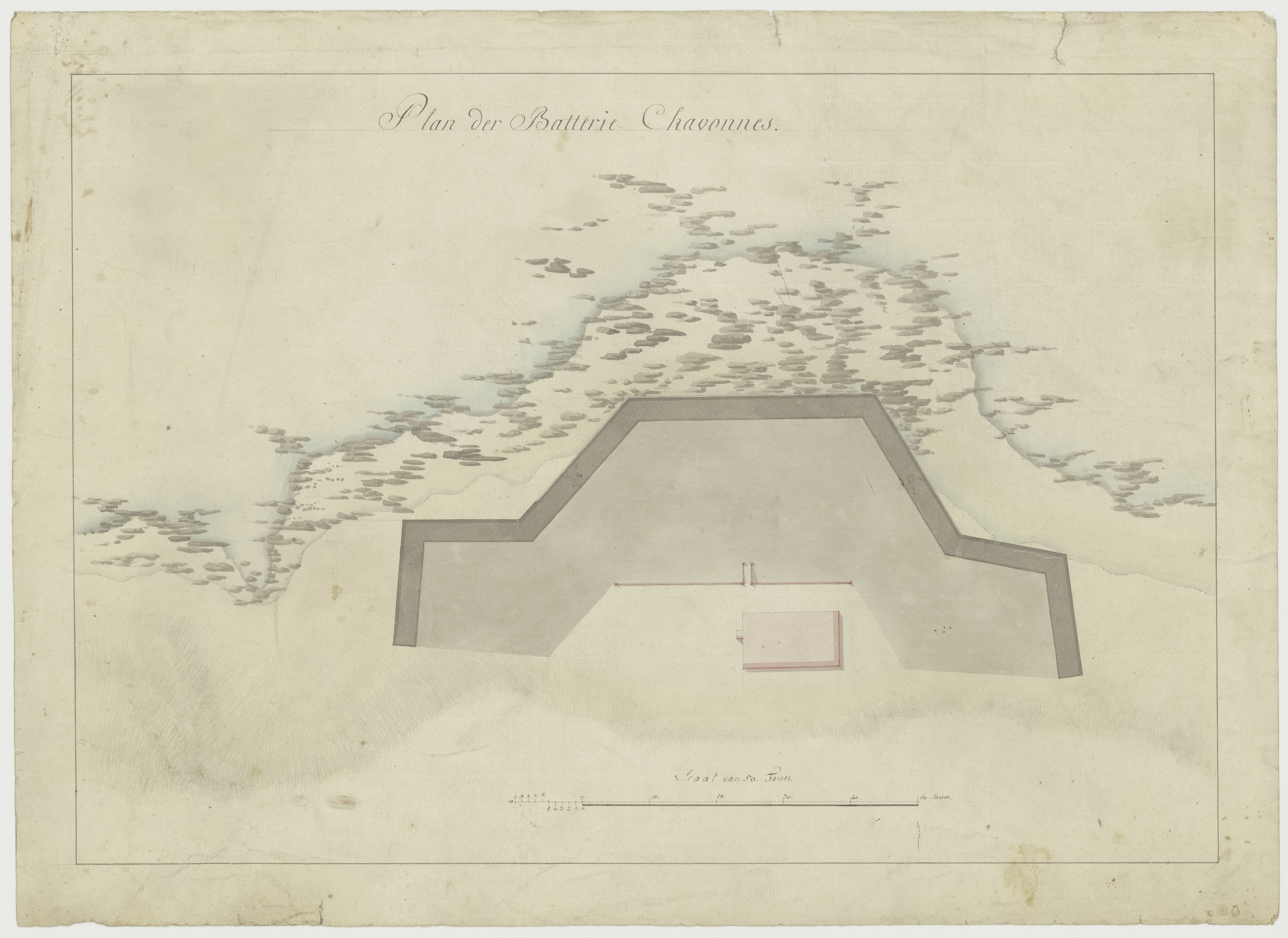
Sketch of the Chavonnes battery

The battery was built in a “U” shape with a stone wall built on a rocky outcrop on the Western flank at the waters edge. It had 16 mounted guns with an arc of fire of nearly 180 degrees. The battery also served as a prison and a quarantine and convalescent wing of the old Somerset Hospital.

It was used to protect the bay and town until 1861 when construction work started on the Alfred basin and some of the stone and rubble from the site was used to create a breakwater. Further damage occurred when coal bunkers and later a fish factory were built over the site.

== Excavation and preservation ==
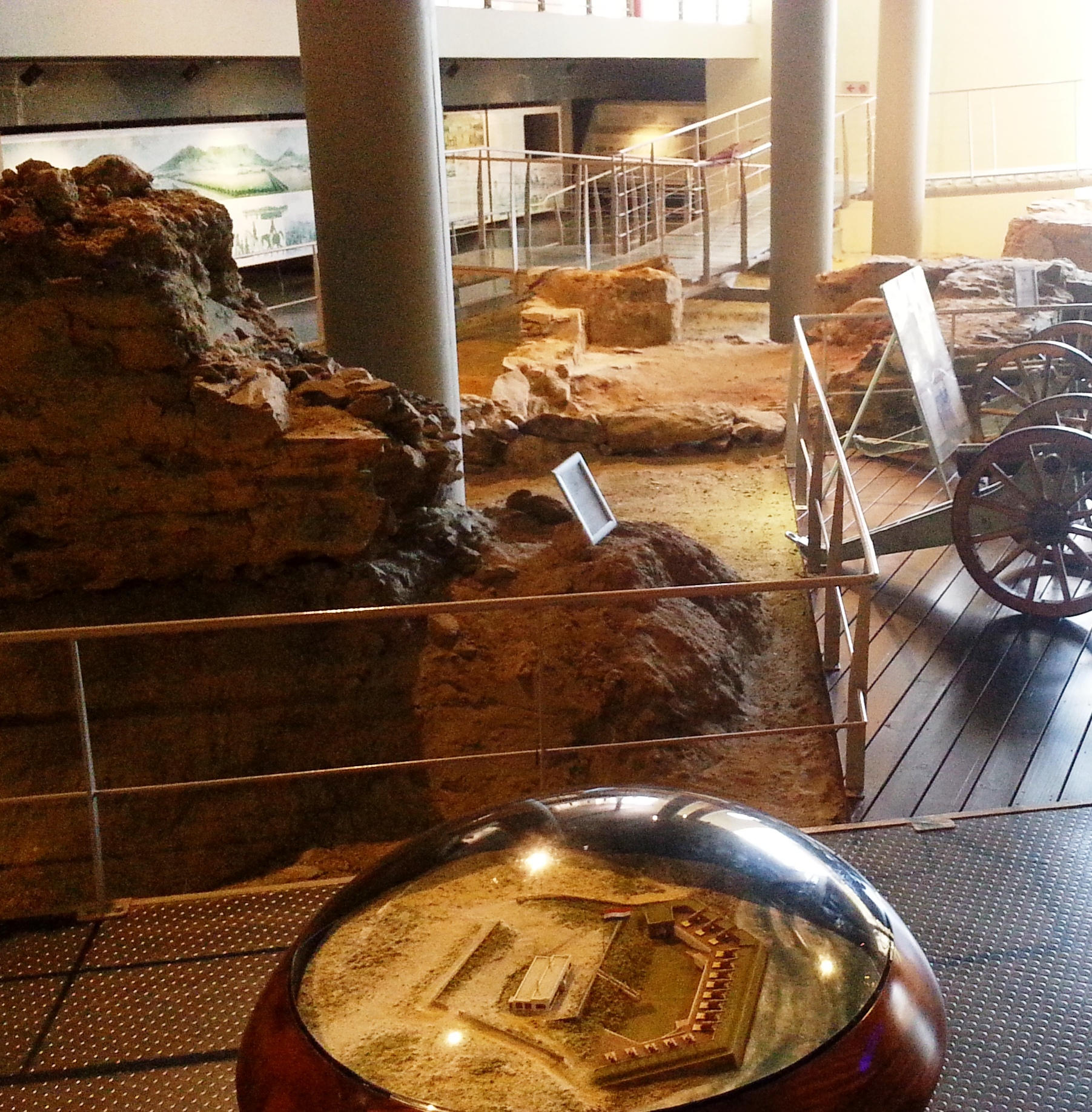
Ruins of the original walls, displays, and artifacts

In the 1990s, during the development of the Clock Tower Precinct at the Victoria & Alfred Waterfront and the construction of an office building for the BoE Stockbrokers group and Nedbank much of the battery was excavated by archaeologists from the University of Cape Town, and has now been opened as a visitor attraction that includes a museum, hosts contemporary art exhibitions, offers guided tours, venue hire and cannon firing.

The museum includes the excavated walls, well and other components of part of the battery, with displays on cannons and the equipment needed to maintain and fire them and information boards related to the history of Cape Town.

== See also ==
- List of Castles and Fortifications in South Africa
