= List of castles and fortifications in South Africa =

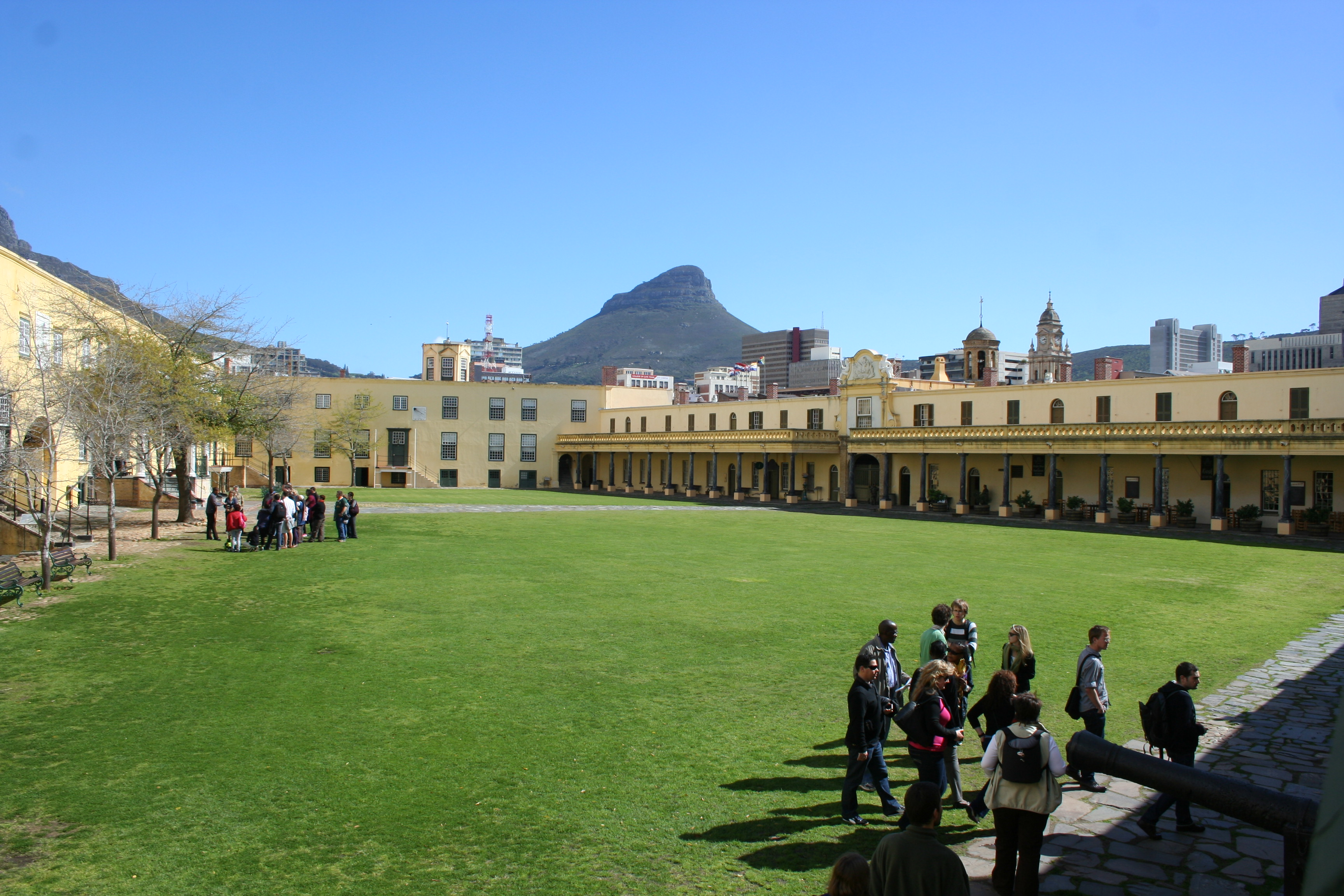
Castle of Good Hope, the first permanent building in South Africa.

This is a list of former and current castles and fortifications in South Africa and contains historical fortifications, military instillations, mock castles and Manor Houses, that may be referred to as "castles".

A fortification or Fort is easily identifiable as a structure built purely for defensive purposes, however a castle is slightly more subjective. The historical term castle refers to a Fortification that was also a seat of power and governance over the local area, the modern term might refer to a Manor House, a Châteaux or a Mansion and is more a matter of semantics. The castles will be discussed by province.

== Eastern Cape ==
Castle or Fortification	Location	Date	Image
Fort Armstrong	Kat River	1836	
Fort Beaufort	Fort Beaufort	1839	
Cock's Castle	Port Alfred	About 1840	
Fort Cox	Middledrift	1835	
Fort Frederick	Gqeberha	1799	
Fort Glamorgan	East London	1848	
Fort Hare	Alice	1835	
Fort Murray	King Williams Town	1835	
Fort Peddie	Peddie	1835	
Fort Selwyn	Grahamstown	1836	
Soffiantini's Castle	East London	1951	
Fort White	King Williams Town	1835	

== Free State ==
Castle or Fortification	Location	Date	Image
Fort Bloemfontein	Bloemfontein	1848	
Camelot Castle	Clarens		
Clarens Castle	Clarens		
Destiny Castle	Fouriesburg		
Deneysville Castle	Deneysville		
Fort Drury	Bloemfontein	1846	
Harrismith Blockhouse	Harrismith		
Jacobsdal Blockhouse	Jacobsdal		
Naval Hill	Bloemfontein		
Riverford Blockhouse	Bloemfontein		
Old Presidency	Bloemfontein	1860	
Oliewen House	Bloemfontein	1941	
Castle of Philippolis	Philippolis	1800s	

== Gauteng ==
Castle or Fortification	Location	Date	Image
Arkleton House	Pretoria		
Barton Keep	Pretoria	1886	
Bronberg Castle	Pretoria		
Brooks House	Brooklyn	1925	
Castle da Angelo	Western Pretoria		
Castle Inn Resort	Cullinan		
Erasmus Castle	Pretoria	1892	
Foxwood House	Johannesburg		
Gothic Castle	Pretoria East		
Government House	Pretoria	1906	
Johannesburg Fort	Johannesburg	1899	
Kensington Castle	Kensington	1911	
Fort Klapperkop	Pretoria	1898	
Castle Kyalami	Johannesburg	1992	
Mahlamba Ndlopfu	Pretoria	1940	
Melrose House	Pretoria	1886	
The Moors Castle	Krugersdorp		
Ou Raadsaal	Pretoria	1891	
Palace of Justice	Pretoria	1897	
Parktown Manions	Johannesburg	After 1894	
Parkview Castle	Johannesburg	1907	
Royal Jontica	Pretoria		
Fort Schanskop	Pretoria	1897	
Smuts House	Irene	1909	
Sorex Estate	Centurion		
Stone Castle	Johannesburg		
The Cullinan	Johannesburg	1910	
Three Castles Building	Johannesburg	1899	00000-Castle_Cigarette_Factory-Johannesburg-s
Villa D'Este	Saxonwold		
Westfort	Pretoria	1898	
Witkop Blockhouse	Johannesburg	1900	
Fort Wonderboompoort	Pretoria	1897	Fort_Wonderboompoort
Yadah Castle	Centurion		
Yukon House	Johannesburg	1911	
Zwartkoppies Hall	Pretoria	1886	

== Kwazulu-Natal ==
Castle or Fortification	Location	Date	Image
Fort Amiel	Newcastle	1896	
Coedmore Castle	Durban	1875	
Castle Hotel	Howick	Before 1900	
Botha House	Pennington		
Fort Durnford	Estcourt	1875	
King's House	Durban	1904	
Fort Mistake	Dundee		
Fort Nongqayi	Eshowe	1883	
Fort Nottingham	Nottingham	1856	
Stratford Castle	Durban		
Stonehaven Castle	Hillcrest	before 1923	

== Limpopo ==
Castle or Fortification	Location	Date	Image
Fort Botha	Louis Trichardt	19th Century	
Fort Edward	Makhado	19th Century	
Castle de Wildt	Modimolle		
Fort Hendrina	Louis Trichardt	Made in 1888	
Fort Louis Campbell	Polokwane	19th Century	
Mapungubwe	Musina	10th Century	Mapungubwe,_Limpopo,_South_Africa_(20356165510)
Schoemansdal Fort	Schoemandal		

== Mpumalanga ==
Castle or Fortification	Location	Date	Image
Fort Burger	Burgersfort	1876	
Flycatcher Castle	Graskop		
Fort Merensky	Middelburg	1865	
Voortrekker Fort	Ohrigstad	1847	
Fort Weeber	Sekhukhune		

== North West ==
Castle or Fortification	Location	Date	Image
Boekenhoutfontein	Rustenburg	1860s	
Camelotte Castle	Hartebeestpoort		
Excalibur Castle	Rustenburg		
Fountain Villa	Klerksdorp		
Potchefstroom Fort	Potchefstroom		
Rectors Residence	Potchefstroom	19th century	9_2_256_0008-Old_Fort_and_Cemetery-Potchefstroom-s
Voortrekker Fort	Potchefstroom		
Cannon Kopje Fort	Mafikeng		

== Northern Cape ==
Castle or Fortification	Location	Date	Image
Carnarvon Blockhouse	Carnarvon		
Daniëlskuil Blockhouse	Daniëlskuil		
Die Kasteel	Hartswater		
Hospital Hill Blockhouse	Noupoort		
Leeu-Gamka Blockhouse	Leeu-Gamka		
Letterklip	Namaqualand	1901	
McGregor House	Kimberley		
Prieska Kopje Blockhouse	Prieska		

== Western Cape ==
Castle or Fortification	Location	Date	Image
Bygracealone Manor	George		
Cape Town City Hall	Cape Town	1905	
Casa Labia	Muizenberg	1930	
Castle of Good Hoope	Cape Town	1670s	
Castle on the Cliff	Plettenberg Bay		
Castle on the Hill	Bainskloof Pass	About 1941	
Celtic Castle	Gordon's Bay		
Colona Castle	Muizenberg		
Devon Castle	Stellenbosch		
Dunn's Castle	Piketberg	1890s	
East Fort	Hout Bay	1782	
Elsenburg House	Stellenbosch	1754	
English Fort	Montagu	1875-1877	
Fort de Goede Hoop	Cape Town	1652	
Redoubt Duijnhoop	Cape Town	1654	
George Victorian Hotel	George	1815	George_-_Western_Cape_06_-_Museum
Greylands Ostrich Palace	Oudtshoorn		
Gottland Palace	Oudtshoorn		
Grosvenor House	Stellenbosch	1803	
Hawthorndon House	Wynberg	1683	
Herstein Castle	Stellenbosch	1980s	
Het Vlock Kasteel	Riebeek-Kasteel		
Lanserac House	Stellenbosch	1830	
Le Roux Townhouse	Oudtshoorn	1909	
Lichtenstein Castle	Hout Bay	1986-1998	
Lord Milner Hotel	Matjiesfontein	1884	
Noetzie Castles	Knysna	After 1930	
Pinehurst Mansion	Oudtshoorn	1911	
Robben Island Forts	Robben Island	1940s	
Rus in Urbe Mansion	Oudtshoorn	1902	
Sandenburg	Cape Town	1640s	
Fort Simon	Stellenbosch	1997	
Somerset Hospital	Cape Town	1864	Somerset_Hospital_Cape_Town
Stone Castle	Saldanha		
Knysna Fort	Knysna	1899	
Veretti Castle	Mossel Bay	2004	
Vergelegen Estate	Somerset West	1700	
Villa Anna Katarina	Riebeek-Kasteel		
Welgeluk Ostrich Palace	Oudtshoorn	1910	
West Fort	Hout Bay		

=== Townhouses in Cape Town ===
Building	Location	Date	Image
Bertram House	Gardens	1854	
Genadendal Residence	Rondebosch	18th Century	
Groot Constantia	Constantia	17th Century	
Groote Schuur	Rondebosch	18th Century	
Jan de Waal House	City Bowl		
Koopmans-de Wet House	City Bowl	1701	
Leeuwenhof	Gardens	1788	
Leinster Hall	Gardens		
Martin Melck House	City Bowl	1781	
Ravenswood House	City Bowl		
Rust en Vreugd	City Bowl	18th Century	
Saasveld House	Gardens		
Tuynhuys	City Bowl	1682	
Welgemeend	Gardens		

== Blockhouses of the Second Anglo-Boer War ==
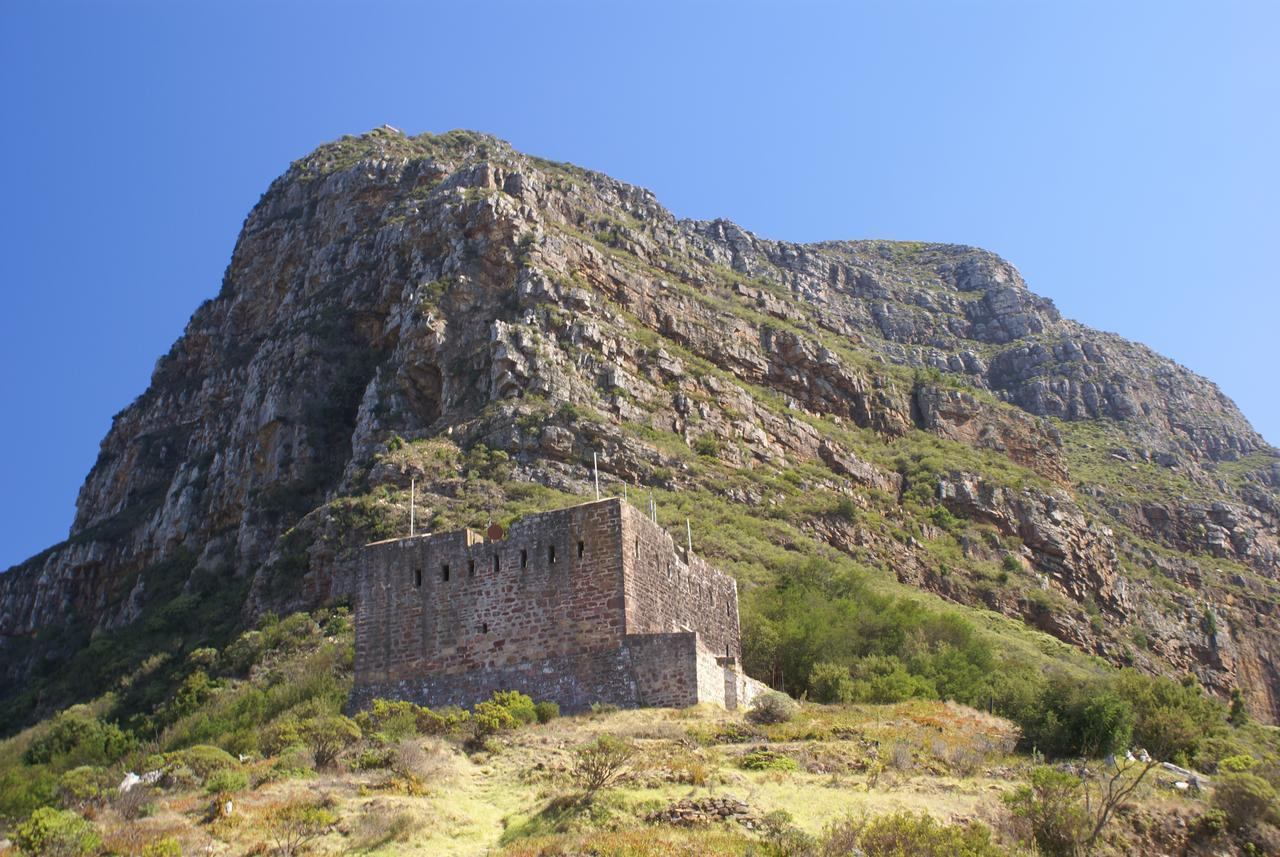
King's Blockhouse in Cape Town

- Aliwal North Blockhouses (2)
- Broederstroom Blockhouse
- Burgersdorp Blockhouse
- Dewetsville Blockhouse
- Fort Harlech, Krugersdorp
- Hekpoort Blockhouse
- Hopetown Blockhouse
- Kaalfontein/Zuurfontein Blockhouse
- Modder River Blockhouse
- Noupoort Blockhouse
- Orange River Station
- Pampoennek Blockhouse
- Prieska Blockhouse
- Riversford Blockhouse
- The Reservoir Blockhouse
- The Stormberg Junction South Blockhouse
- Timeball Hill Blockhouse
- The Warrenton Railway Bridge Blockhouse
- Warmbaths Blockhouse
- Witkop Blockhouse

== See also ==
- South African Heritage Resources Agency
- South African National Museum of Military History
- Provincial heritage site (South Africa)
- Military history of South Africa
- Fortifications of the Cape Peninsula
- List of castles in Africa
- History of South Africa
- List of castles
- List of forts
