= Fort of Good Hope =

Former fortification in Cape Town

- Ford de Goede Hoop
- Cape Town, South Africa
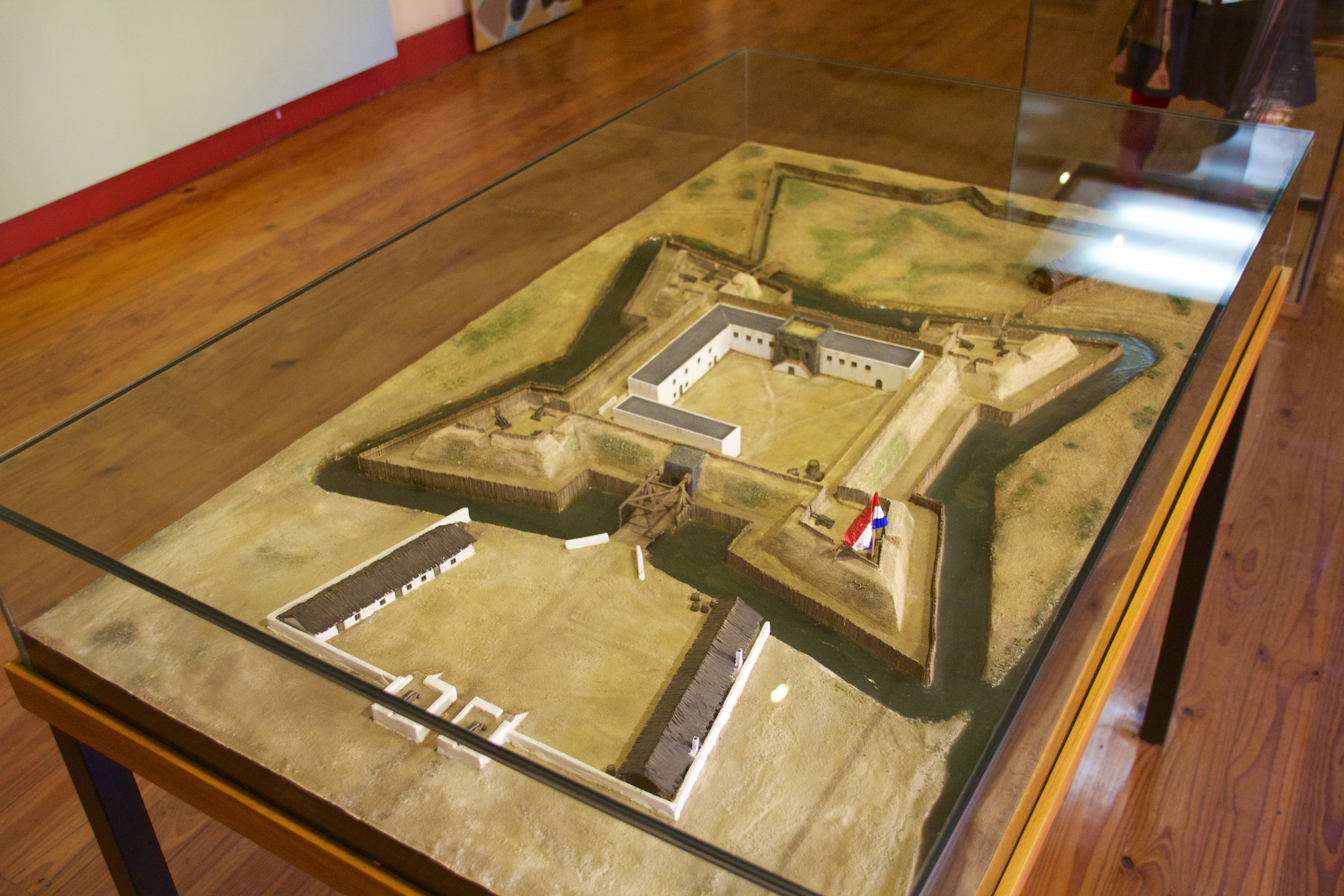
- A model of the fort as it would have appeared in the 1650s

Site information
- Type: Fort

Location
- Location in the Western Cape
- Coordinates: 33°55′27″S 18°25′27″E

Site history
- Built: 1652; 374 years ago
- Built by: Dutch East India Company
- Materials: Earth and timber
- Demolished: Late 17th century

The Fort of Good Hope (Dutch: Ford de Goede Hoop) was the first military building to be erected in what is now Cape Town. It was built in 1652, and was in use until 1674 when it was superseded by the Castle of Good Hope.

== History ==
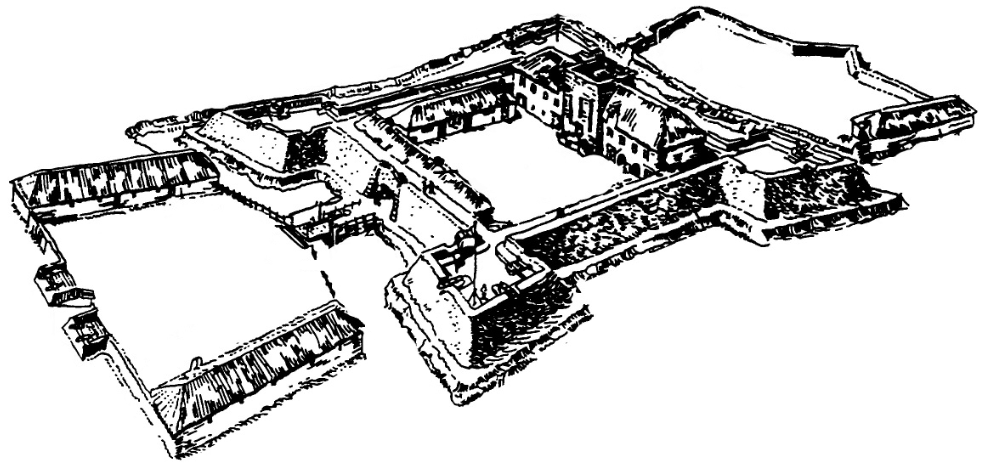
A picture of the Fort of Good Hope (De Goede Hoop) built at the Cape of clay and wood by Jan van Riebeeck in 1652

The Fort was built by the Dutch East India Company, when it established a replenishment station under Jan van Riebeeck on the shore of Table Bay in 1652. Constructed of earth and timber, it was square, with a pointed bastion at each corner. The bastions were named Drommedaris, Walvisch, Oliphant, and Reijger. The bastions were named after the ships in Van Riebeeck's fleet.

Within the Fort were living quarters, kitchens, a council chamber (which was also used for church services), a sick bay, workshops, and storerooms. Cannons were placed on the ramparts. A nearby stream was diverted and channeled to form a moat around the fort. Being built of earth, the Fort needed frequent maintenance and repairs, especially after heavy rains.

In January 1666, work began on a stone fortress to replace the Fort. It took eight years to build, and it was not until 1674 that it was ready for occupation. On 2 May 1674, the council resolved to demolish the Fort, except for some stores which were retained for a while longer, until their contents had been moved into the Castle.

The Fort is sometimes confused with the Redoubt Duijnhoop, which was built some distance away, at the mouth of the Salt River, in 1654.

In 1732 the first Masonic lodge in South Africa was erected, Lodge De Goede Hoop, which was a branch of the Premier Grand Lodge of England.

== See also ==
- Castle of Good Hope
- Fortifications of the Cape Peninsula
- Redout Duijnhoop
- List of Castles and Fortifications in South Africa
