= Redoubt Duijnhoop =

Historical fortification in Table Bay, South Africa

Coordinates: 33°55′30″S 18°25′30″E

- Salt River, Table Bay, South Africa
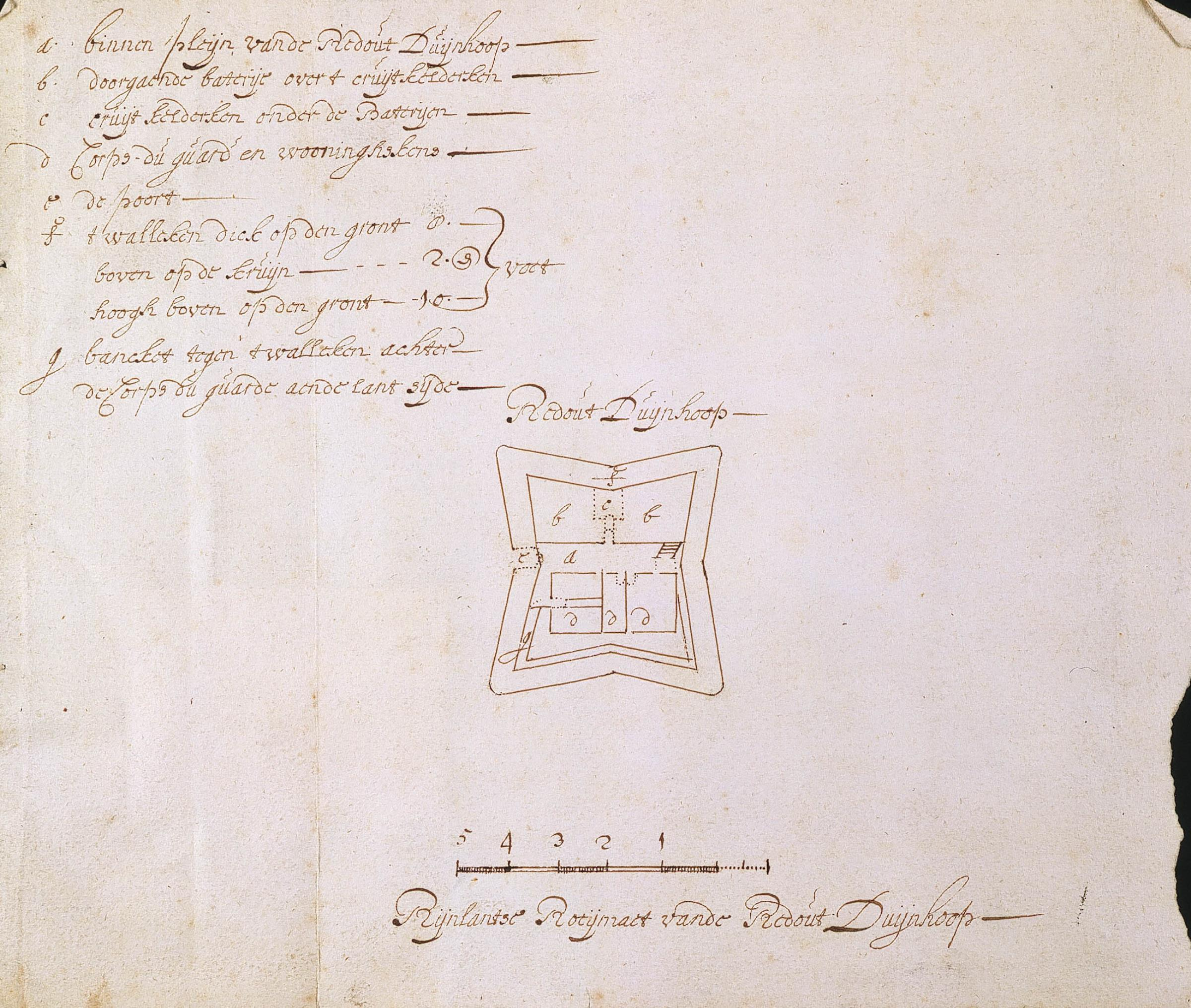
- 1654 diagram

Site information
- Type: Redoubt

Site history
- Built: 1654
- Built by: Jan van Riebeeck
- Materials: Clay and timber
- Fate: Demolished, 1672

The Redoubt Duijnhoop was a square demi-bastioned clay and timber Redoubt built fort constructed at the mouth of the Salt River, leading into Table Bay, South Africa in January–February 1654. It formed part of the defences of the Vereenigde Oost-Indische Compagnie 'VOC' replenishment station, which had been established under Jan van Riebeeck in 1652. The purpose of the station was to supply ships travelling between the Netherlands and the Dutch East Indies.

The redoubt was armed with two 12-pounder guns, and on 22 April 1654, Van Riebeeck informed the VOC's directors that "in addition to the Fort de Goede Hoop, a redoubt named Duijnhoop standing at the Salt River for the protection and reinforcement of this Table Bay, has been fully placed in a position of defence." In addition to covering the approach to the Salt River mouth, Duijnhoop served as a signalling station to warn the Fort of approaching ships.

By 1661, Duijnhoop had been abandoned, and fallen into disrepair. It was repaired after a warning that a French fleet might pass the Cape, and a second redoubt, named Santhoop, was built nearby. By 1666, however, both had been allowed to fall into disrepair again. Duijnhoop was demolished in 1672.

Duijnhoop is sometimes confused with the Fort de Goede Hoop.

== See also ==
- Castle of Good Hope
- Fort de Goede Hoop
- Fortifications of the Cape Peninsula
- List of Castles and Fortifications in South Africa
