= Somerset Hospital (Cape Town) =

Hospital in Cape Town, South Africa

- Western Cape Department of Health
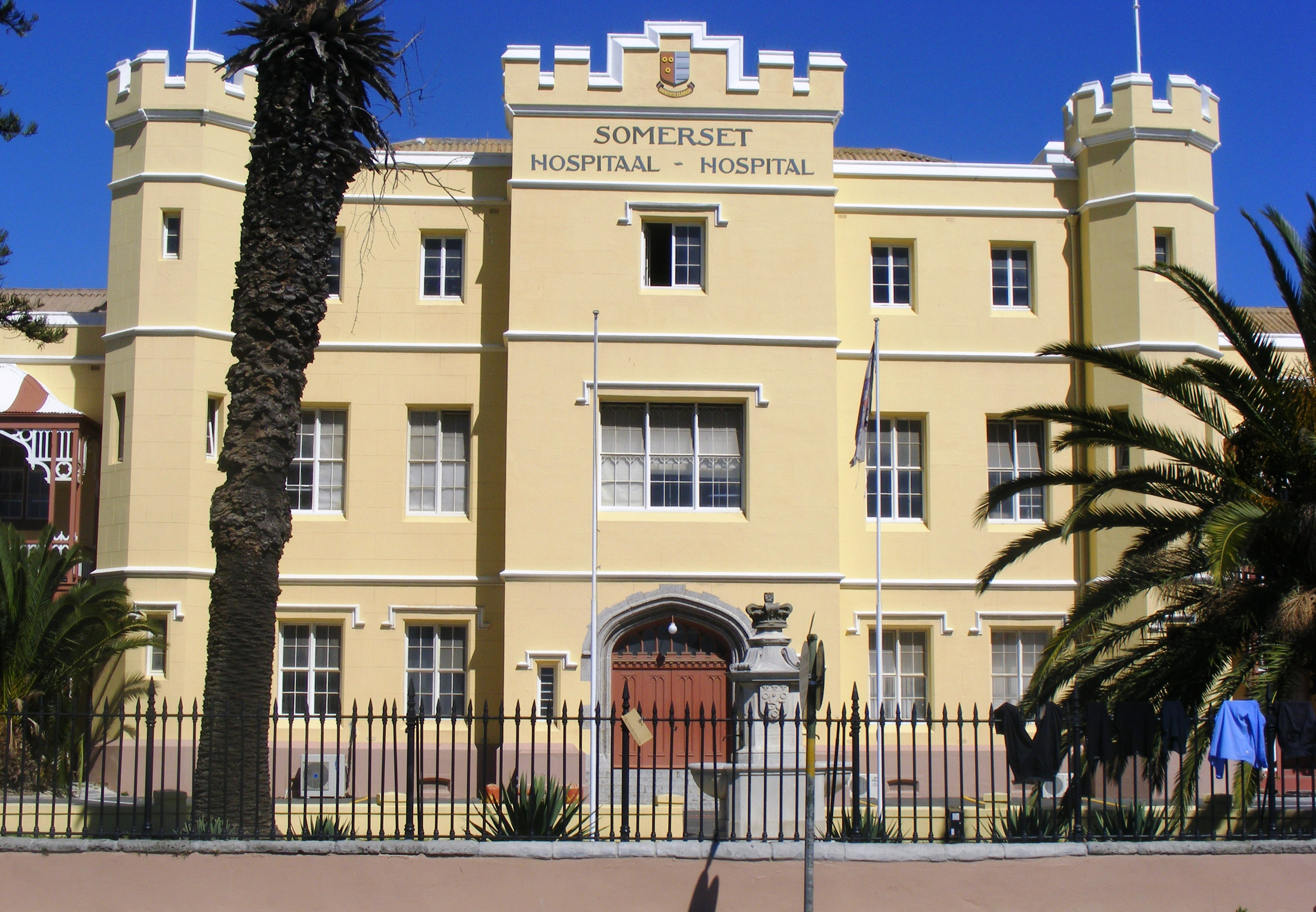

- Shown in Cape Town

Geography
- Location: Victoria & Alfred Waterfront, Cape Town, Western Cape, South Africa
- Coordinates: 33.9047°S 18.4169°E

Organisation
- Care system: Department of Health
- Type: Teaching, District General
- Affiliated university: University of Cape Town
- Patron: Dr Samuel Bailey

Services
- Beds: 330

History
- Founded: 1818

Links
- Lists: Hospitals in South Africa

The Somerset Hospital is a regionall hospital in the Green Point area of Cape Town, South Africa opened in 1864 and has been declared a provincial heritage site.

The hospital replaced one of the same name in Chiapinni Street, which had been founded by Dr Samuel Bailey in 1818 as the first civilian hospital in Cape Town. It was named after Lord Charles Somerset the governor of the Cape Colony who gave land for the construction. The Chavonnes Battery was used as an isolation and convalescent wing.

The cornerstone for the new hospital was laid on 18 August 1859 by the Cape Governor Sir George Grey. In addition to the appointment of medical staff, nurses were recruited from the Florence Nightingale Faculty of Nursing and Midwifery, St Thomas' Hospital in London including Sister Helen Bowden, who in 1877 became the first fully qualified nurse to be appointed as Matron of Somerset Hospital. Subsequently, the hospital established its own nurse training school, becoming the first hospital to train non-white nurses.

From 1918 until 1937, when the Groote Schuur Hospital opened it was the main academic hospital of the University of Cape Town. A new West Wing opened in 1973 for white patients. The old building was renamed the north wing, not because of their position but the N meant for non-white patients and the W of West Wing signified that it was for Whites. The high incidence of HIV infections amongst the patients led to the establishment of the hospital as a prime referral centre for the treatment of AIDS.

Since then various plans have been announced for the development of the grounds including hotels, offices and residential accommodation. The hospital is also home to the Cape Medical Museum.

In 2008 the hospital appealed for funds from local businesses to establish a new trauma unit and a ward for women suffering from a spontaneous miscarriage. In 2010 it opened a new measles ward following a rise in measles cases in Cape Town. In 2010 a studio was built, along with its own lift, on the top of the hospital for use by BBC presenters during 2010 FIFA World Cup matches at the nearby stadium. Additionally in 2010 plans were announced to move the hospital to a new site in the northern sector of the city, to serve the densely populated West Coast region.

== Coat of arms ==
The hospital assumed a coat of arms in the late 1950s and registered it at the Bureau of Heraldry in 1970 : Per pale, dexter Gules, three annulets Or and sinister barry of six Azure and Argent. The registered blazon incorrectly gives the sinister side as "barry of six Argent and Azure".
