= Castle of Good Hope =

17th-century bastion fort in Cape Town, South African

- Kasteel de Goede Hoop; Kasteel die Goeie Hoop
- South Africa
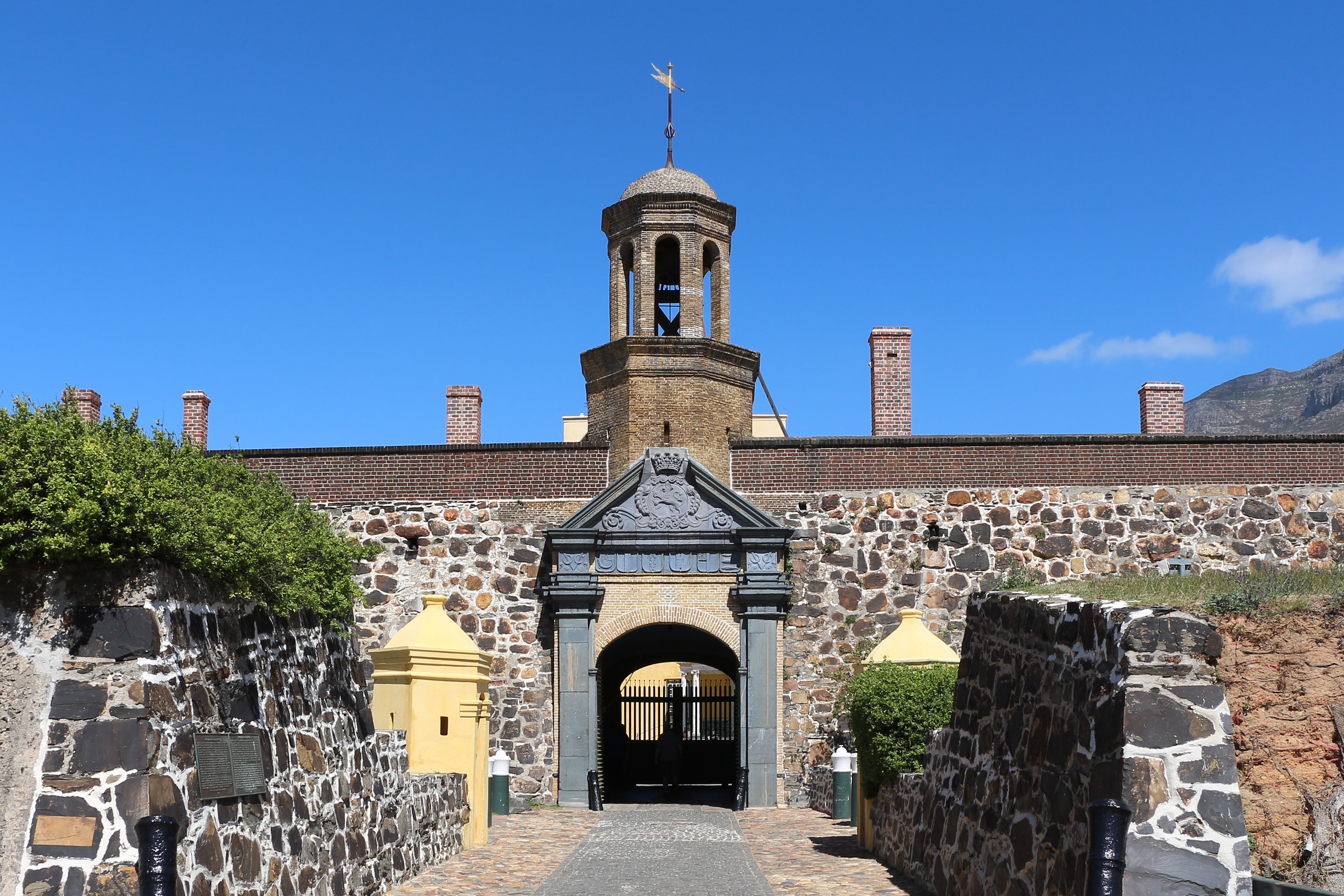
- Gateway to the Castle of Good Hope

Site information
- Type: Bastion fort
- Controlled by: South Africa
- Open to the public: Yes

Location
- Coordinates: 33°55′33″S 18°25′40″E

Site history
- Built: 1666–1679
- Battles/wars: Second Boer War

The Castle of Good Hope (Dutch: Kasteel de Goede Hoop; Afrikaans: Kasteel die Goeie Hoop) is a 17th century bastion fort in Cape Town, South Africa. Originally located on the coastline of Table Bay, following land reclamation the fort is now located inland. In 1936 the Castle was declared a historical monument (now a provincial heritage site) and following restorations in the 1980's it is considered the best preserved example of a Dutch East India Company fort.

== History ==
Built by the Dutch East India Company between 1666 and 1679, the Castle is the oldest existing building in South Africa. It replaced an older fort called the Fort de Goede Hoop which was constructed from clay and timber and built by Jan van Riebeeck upon his arrival at the Cape of Good Hope in 1652.Two redoubts, Redoubt Kyckuit (Lookout) and Redoubt Duijnhoop (Duneheap) were built at the mouth of the Salt River in 1654.The purpose of the Dutch settlement in the Cape was to act as a replenishment station for ships passing the treacherous coast around the Cape on long voyages between the Netherlands and the Dutch East Indies (now Indonesia).

During 1664, tensions between Great Britain and the Netherlands rose amid rumours of war. That same year, Commander Zacharias Wagenaer, successor to Jan van Riebeeck, was instructed by Commissioner Isbrand Goske to build a pentagonal fortress out of stone. The first stone was laid on 2 January 1666. The fortress was partially built by slave labour. The VOC was unsure about the size of the local population groups and thus feared a revolt if they enslaved them; instead they brought in up to 60,000 enslaved people from Madagascar, Mozambique, the Dutch-Indies, and India. Work was interrupted frequently because the Dutch East India Company was reluctant to spend money on the project. On 26 April 1679, the five bastions were named after the main titles of William III of Orange-Nassau: Leerdam to the west, with Buuren, Katzenellenbogen, Nassau, and Oranje clockwise from it. The names of these bastions have been used as street names in suburbs in various provinces, but primarily of Cape Town, such as Stellenberg, Bellville.

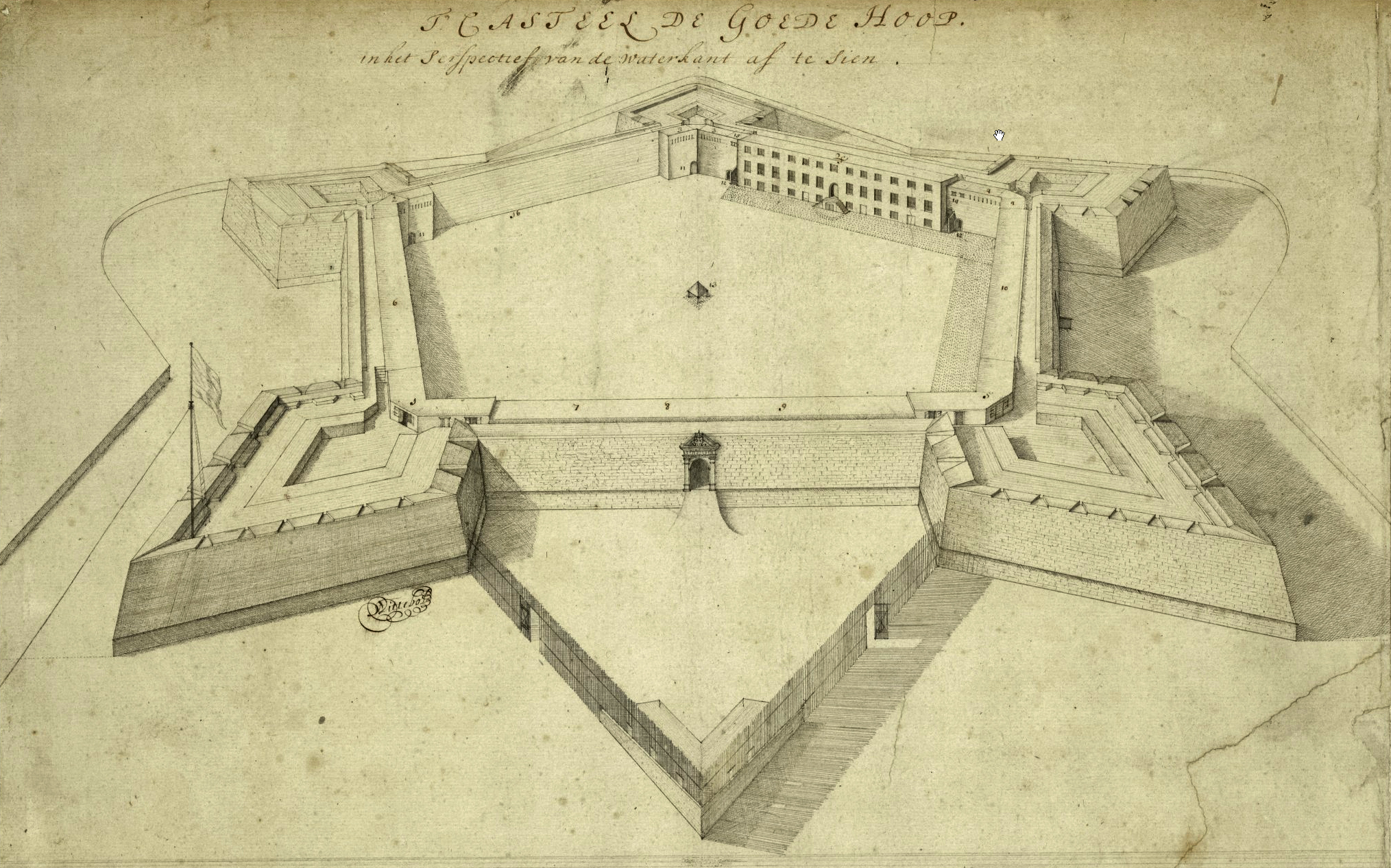
Sketch of Castle of Good Hope in 1680

In 1682 the gated entry replaced the old entrance, which had faced the sea. A bell tower, situated over the main entrance, was built in 1684—the original bell, the oldest in South Africa, was cast in Amsterdam in 1697 by the East-Frisian bellmaker Claude Fremy, and weighs just over 300 kilograms (660 lb). It was used to announce the time, as well as warning citizens in case of danger, since it could be heard 10 kilometres away. It was also rung to summon residents and soldiers when important announcements needed to be made.

The French author François-Timoléon de Choisy was part of a party who resupplied at the fort in June 1685 on their way to Siam, and described the building thus:

"The fortress is very attractive. The dwellings consist of houses mostly covered in thatch, but so clean and so white that you know they are Dutch. There is a garden which the Company has laid out; I would love it to be in a corner at Versailles. As far as the eye can see there are walks of orange and lemon trees, vegetable gardens, espaliers, and dwarf trees, the whole interspersed with fresh-water springs...".

During his stay, de Choisy met with the Dutch Commissioner-General and a French chevalier named de Saint-Martin, whilst other members of the party hunted locally for "partridges, roe deer and turtledoves". The Commissioner-General added small suckling pigs and wine from the Canary Islands to their rations, indicative of the stock they kept. de Choisy noted that at the time, more than 25 of the Dutch East India Company ships were stopping annually at the Cape to take on provisions of sheep, wine, fruit and vegetables.

The fortress housed a church, bakery, various workshops, living quarters, shops, and cells, among other facilities. The yellow paint on the walls was originally chosen because it lessened the effect of heat and the sun. A wall, built to protect citizens in case of an attack, divides the inner courtyard, which also houses the De Kat Balcony, which was designed by Louis Michel Thibault with reliefs and sculptures by Anton Anreith. The original was built in 1695, but rebuilt in its current form between 1786 and 1790. From the balcony, announcements were made to soldiers, slaves and burghers of the Cape.

The balcony leads to the William Fehr Collection of paintings and antique furniture. The collection is administered by Iziko Museums of South Africa.

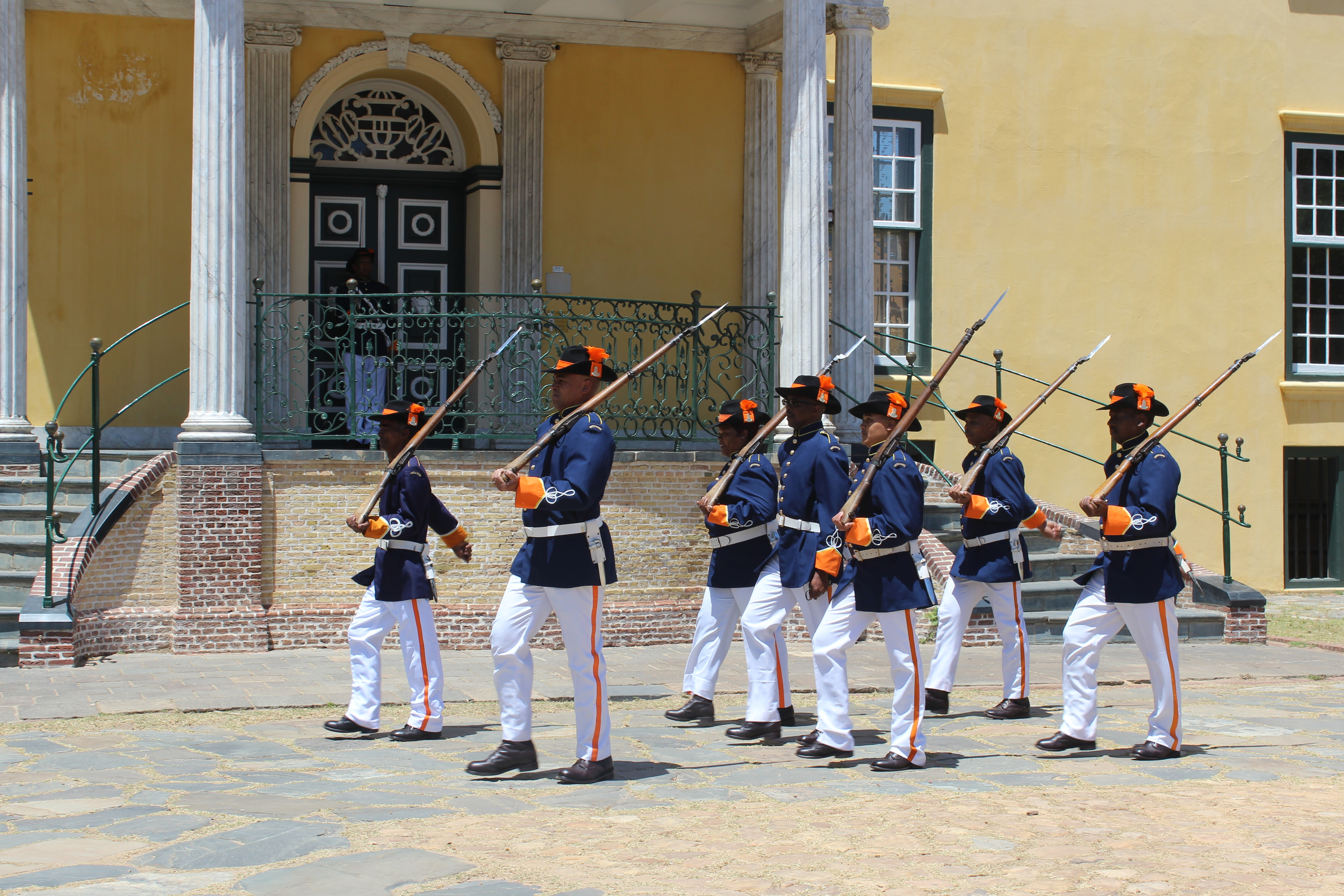
Castle of Good Hope key ceremony

It was briefly home to Lady Anne Barnard, after whom one of the Castle function rooms is named.

During the Second Boer War (1899–1902), part of the castle was used as a prison, and the former cells remain to this day. Fritz Joubert Duquesne, later known as the man who killed Kitchener and the leader of the Duquesne Spy Ring, was one of its more well-known residents. The walls of the castle were extremely thick, but night after night, Duquesne dug away the cement around the stones with an iron spoon. He nearly escaped one night, but a large stone slipped and pinned him in his tunnel. The next morning, a guard found him unconscious but alive.

In 1936, the Castle was declared an historical monument (from 1969 known as a national monument and since 1 April 2000 a provincial heritage site), the first site in South Africa to be so protected. Extensive restorations were completed during the 1980s making the Castle the best preserved example of a Dutch East India Company fort.

The Castle acted as local headquarters for the South African Army in the Western Cape, and today houses the Castle Military Museum and ceremonial facilities for the traditional Cape Regiments. The Castle is also the home of the Cape Town Highlanders Regiment, a mechanised infantry unit.

The Castle Guard was formed in 1986. Originally it was a 48-man unit, its size varied in subsequent years. At 10am on every weekday morning the Castle Guardsmen formally open the Castle for visitors by carrying out the “Key Ceremony”, a ritual closely based on the actual early-morning drills of about 300 years ago.

== Cape Heritage Museum ==
The Cape Heritage Museum, located within the historic Castle of Good Hope in South Africa, is curated by Mr. Igshaan Higgins. This museum provides an inclusive narrative of South Africa's history, highlighting the interactions among different communities such as the Khoi, San, and Dutch, through various epochs including colonialism and apartheid. It aims to offer a balanced reflection on the nation's diverse heritage and complex past.

== Symbolism ==
Prior to being replaced in 2003, the distinctive shape of the pentagonal castle was used on South African Defence Force flags, formed the basis of some rank insignia of major and above, and was used on South African Air Force aircraft.

The South African Defence Force Ensign from 1994 to 2003

Naval ensign of South Africa prior to 1994, showing the castle insignia

Roundel of the South African Air Force from 1982 to 2003

== Gallery ==
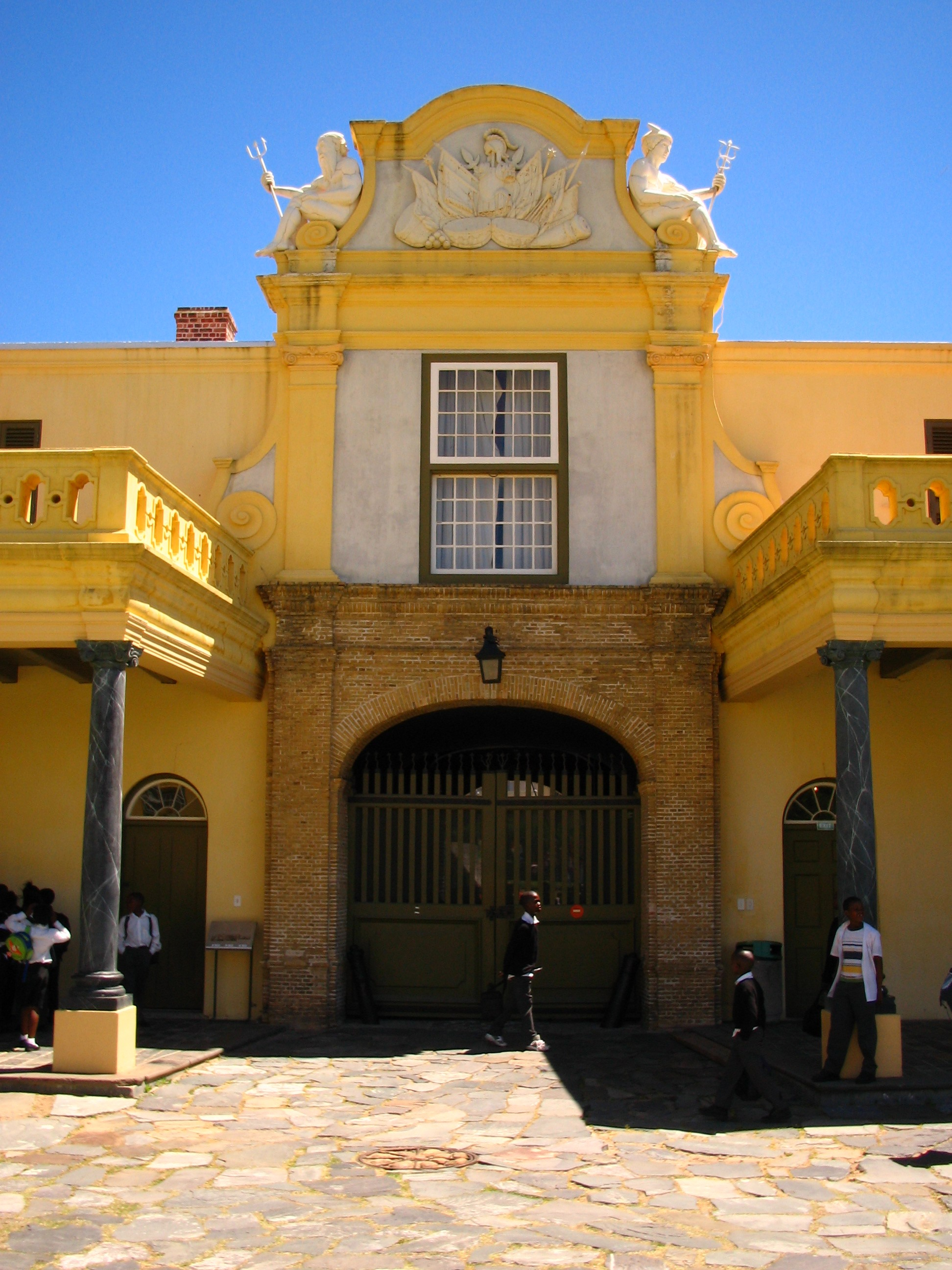
Inner view of the entrance

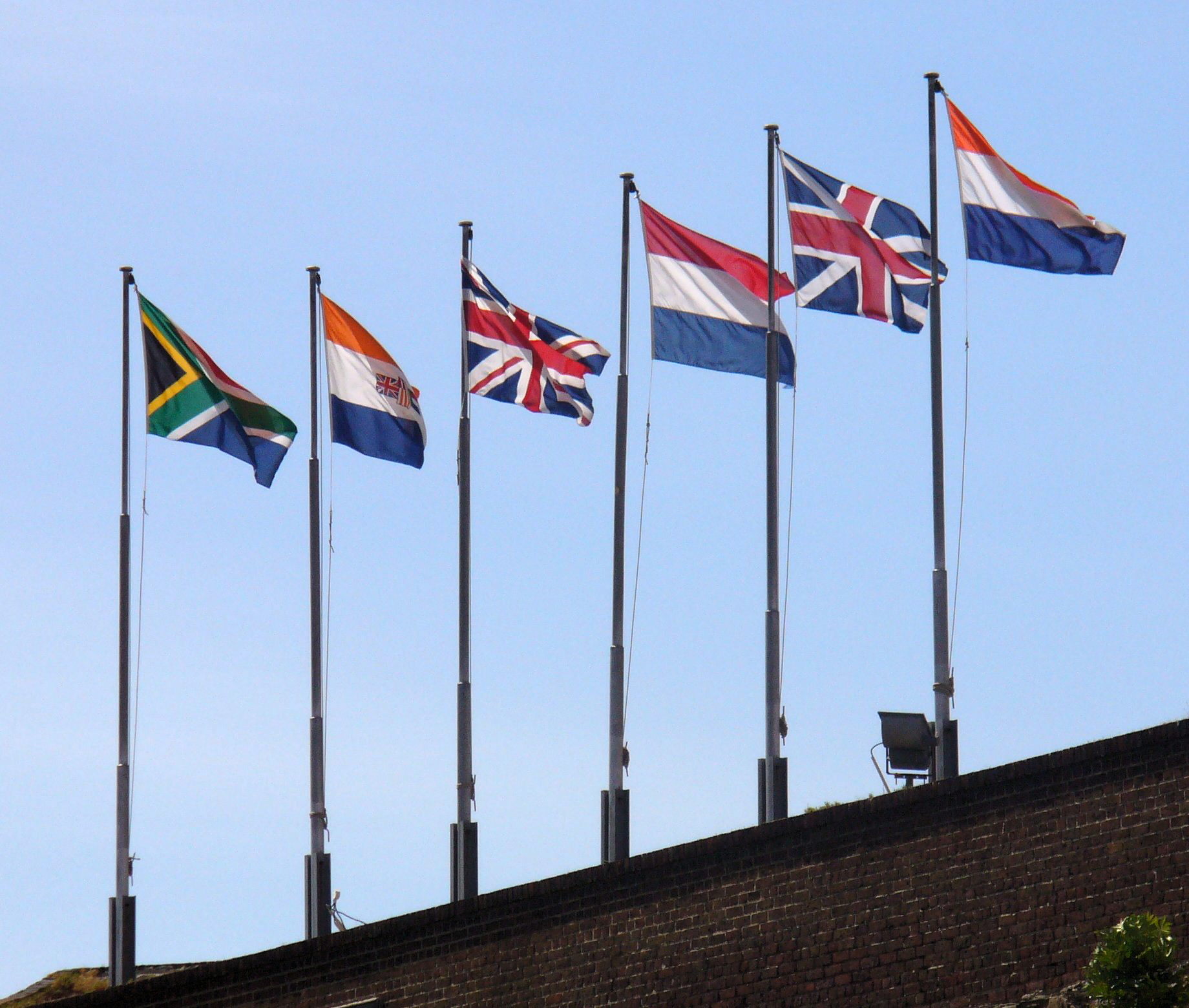
The six historical flags that have flown over the Cape, in chronological order from right to left: the Prince's Flag, the flag of Great Britain, the Batavian flag, the flag of the United Kingdom, the old South African flag, and the current South African flag

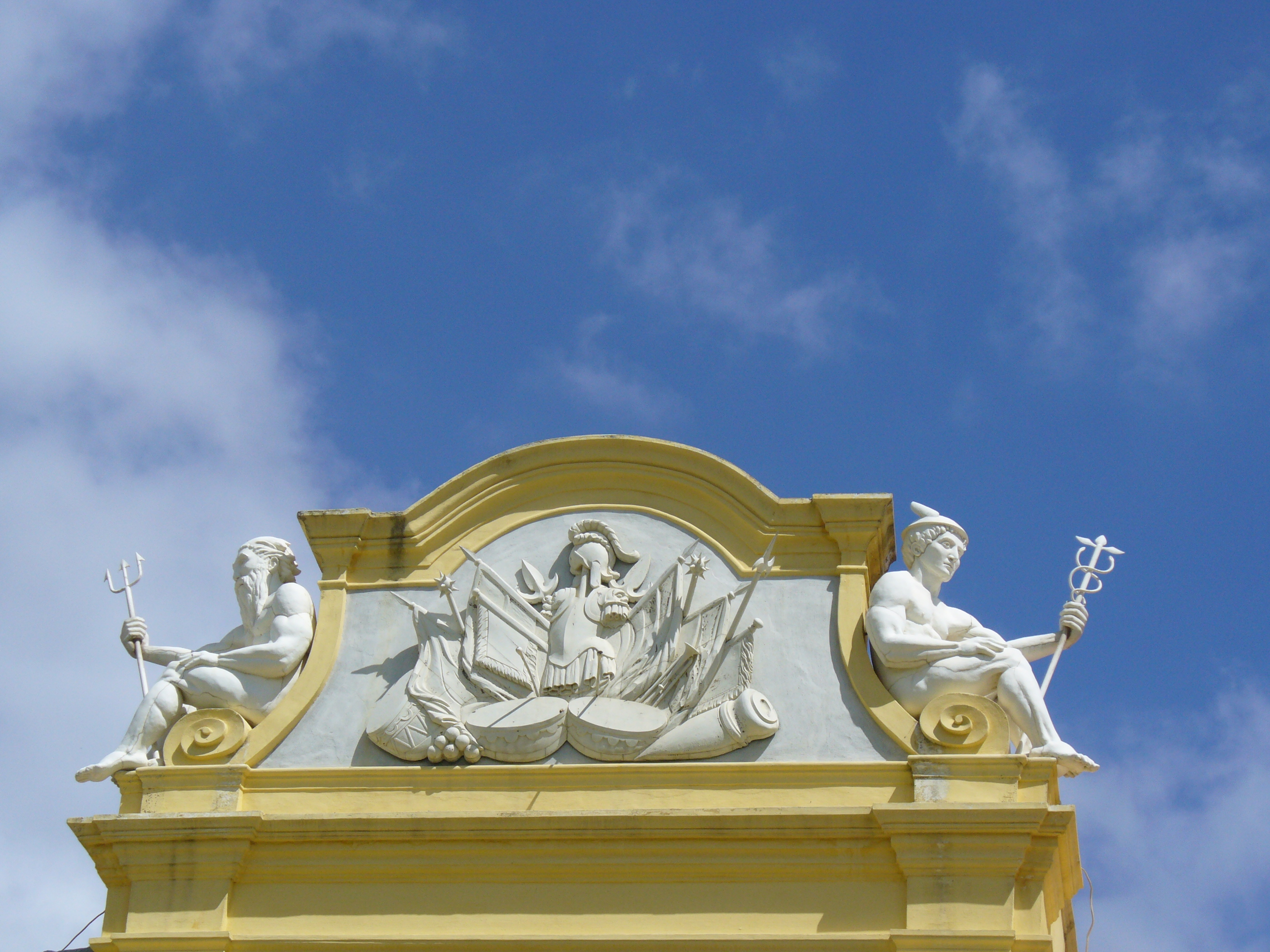
Pediment above entrance to castle.

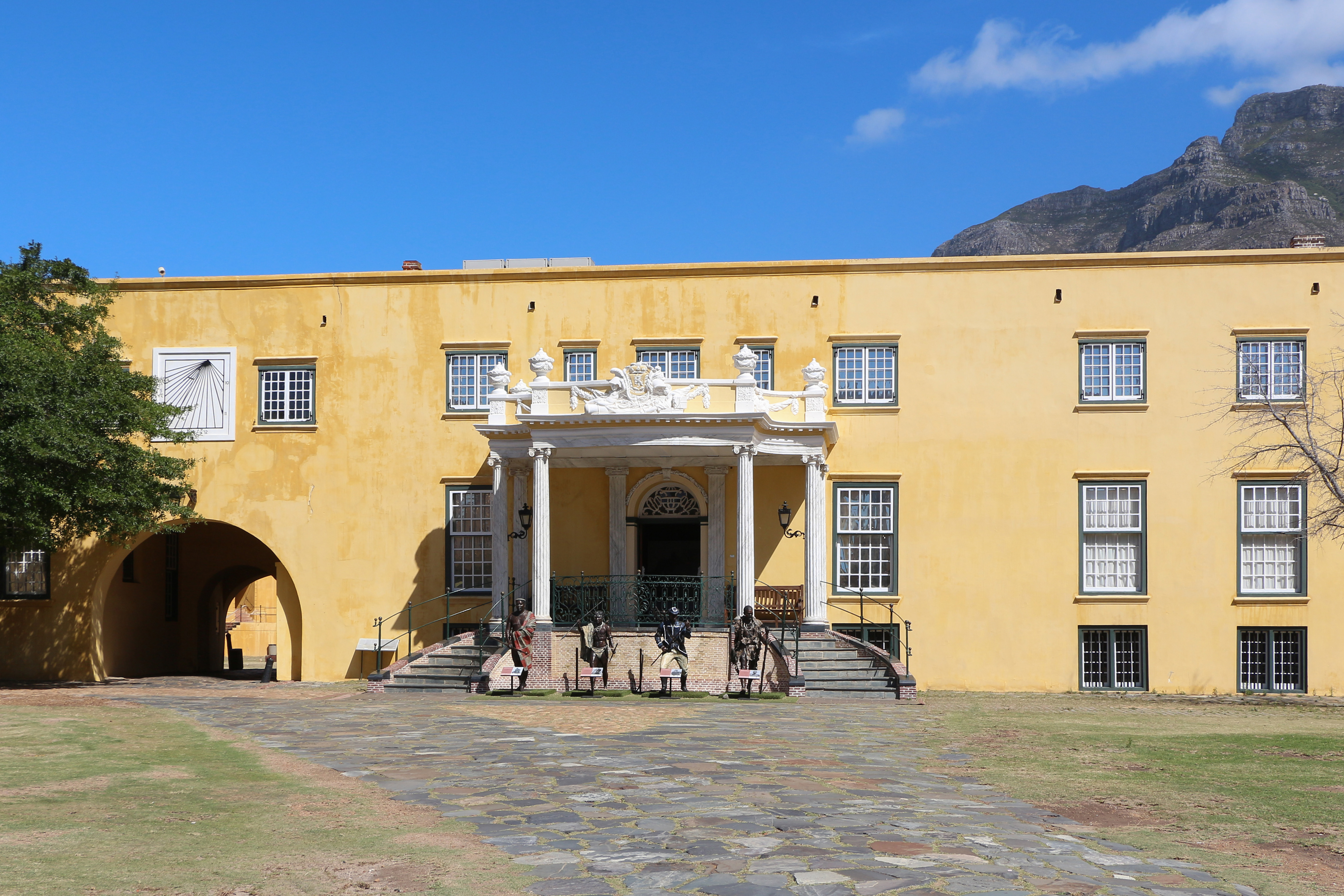
Entrance of main building

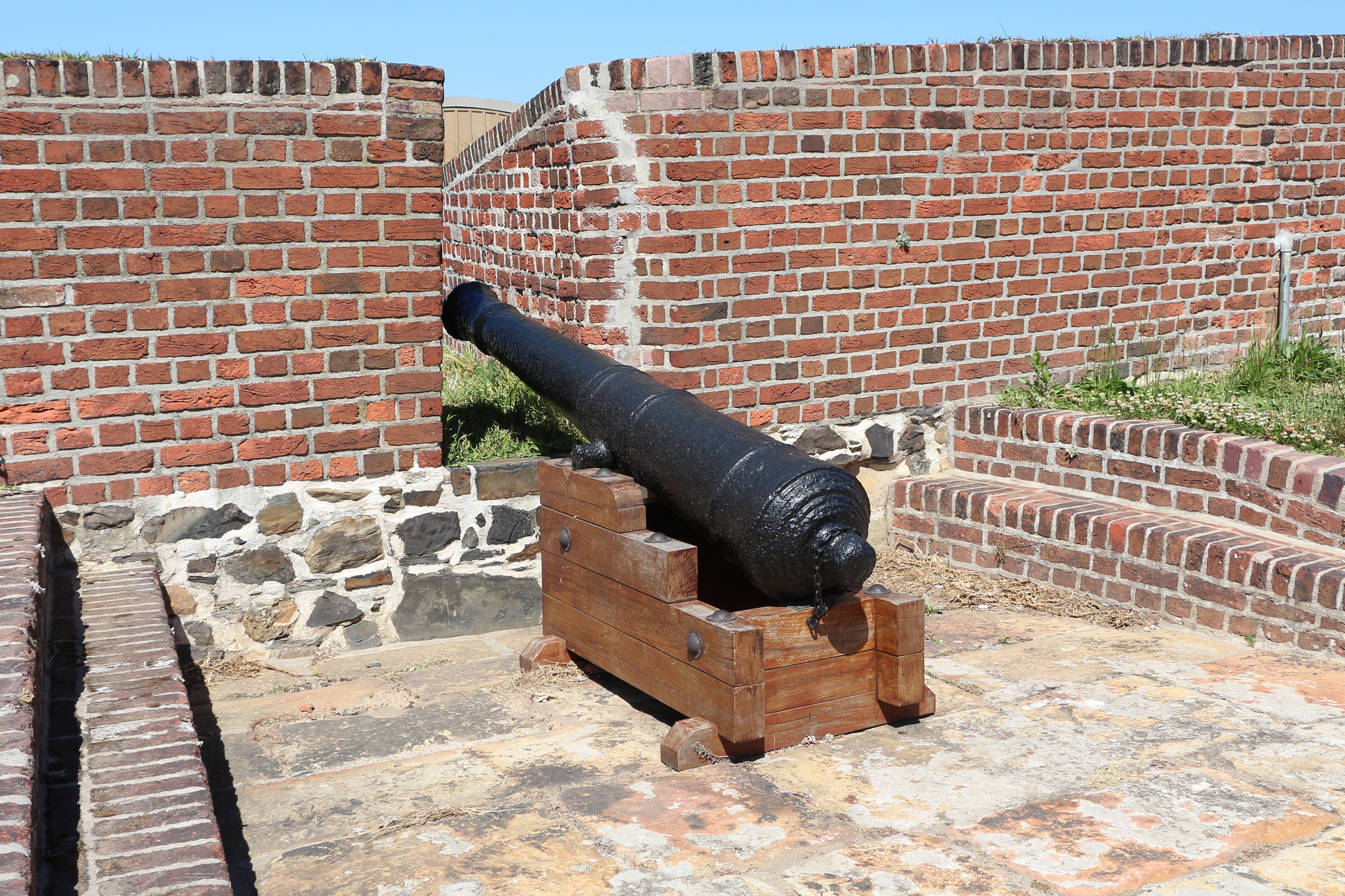
A cannon in the castle

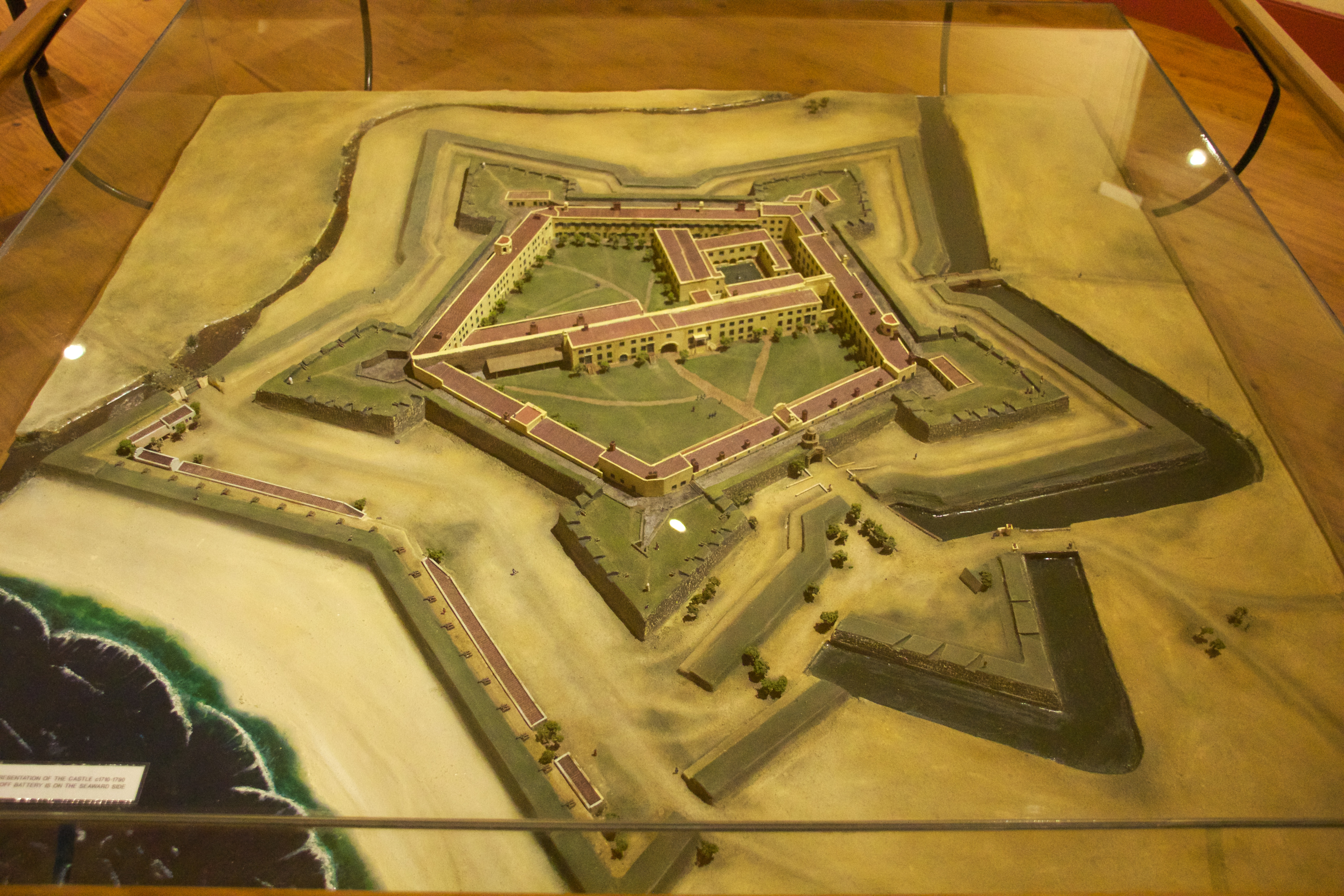
A model of the castle as it would have appeared between 1710 and 1790.

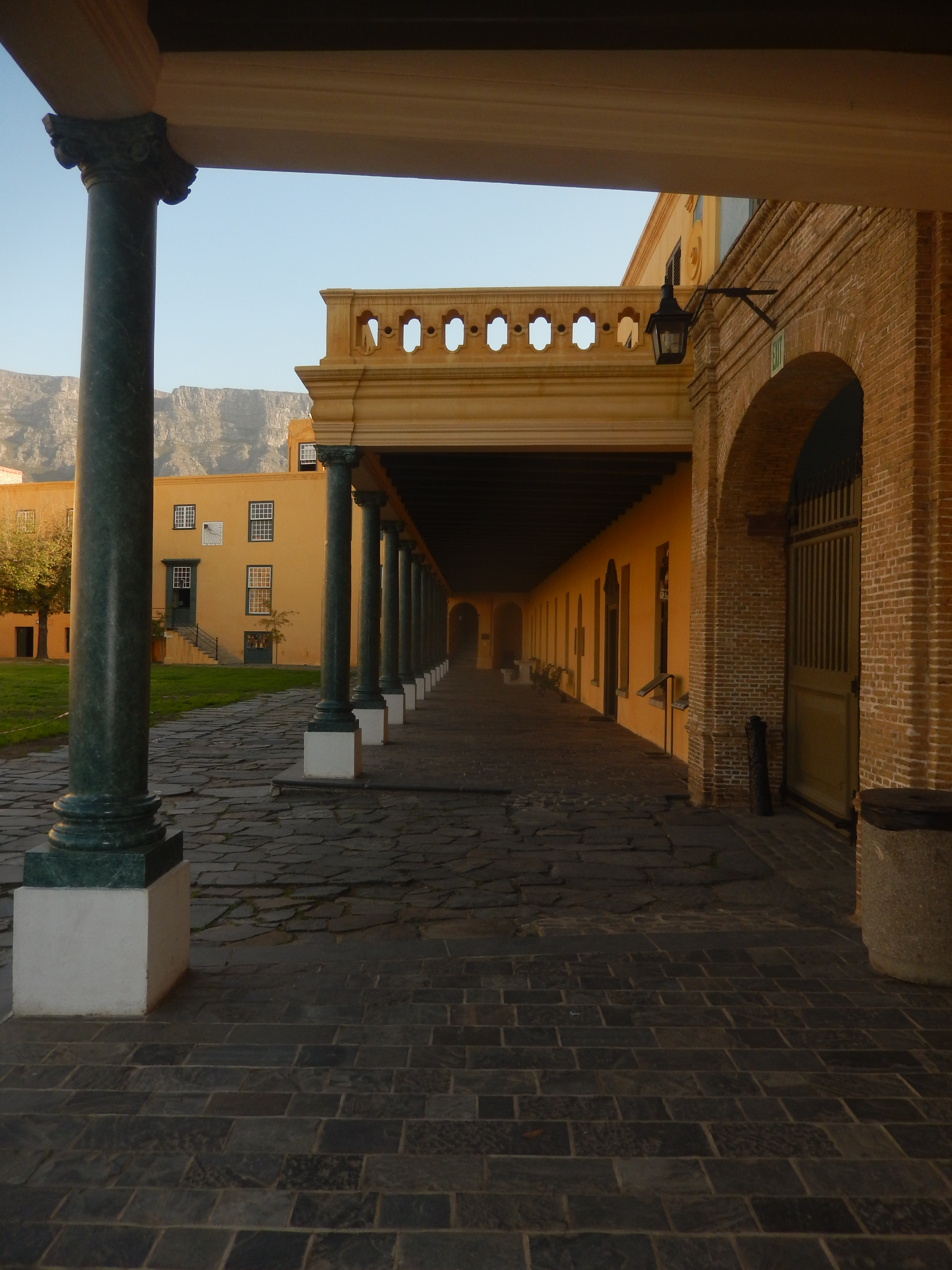

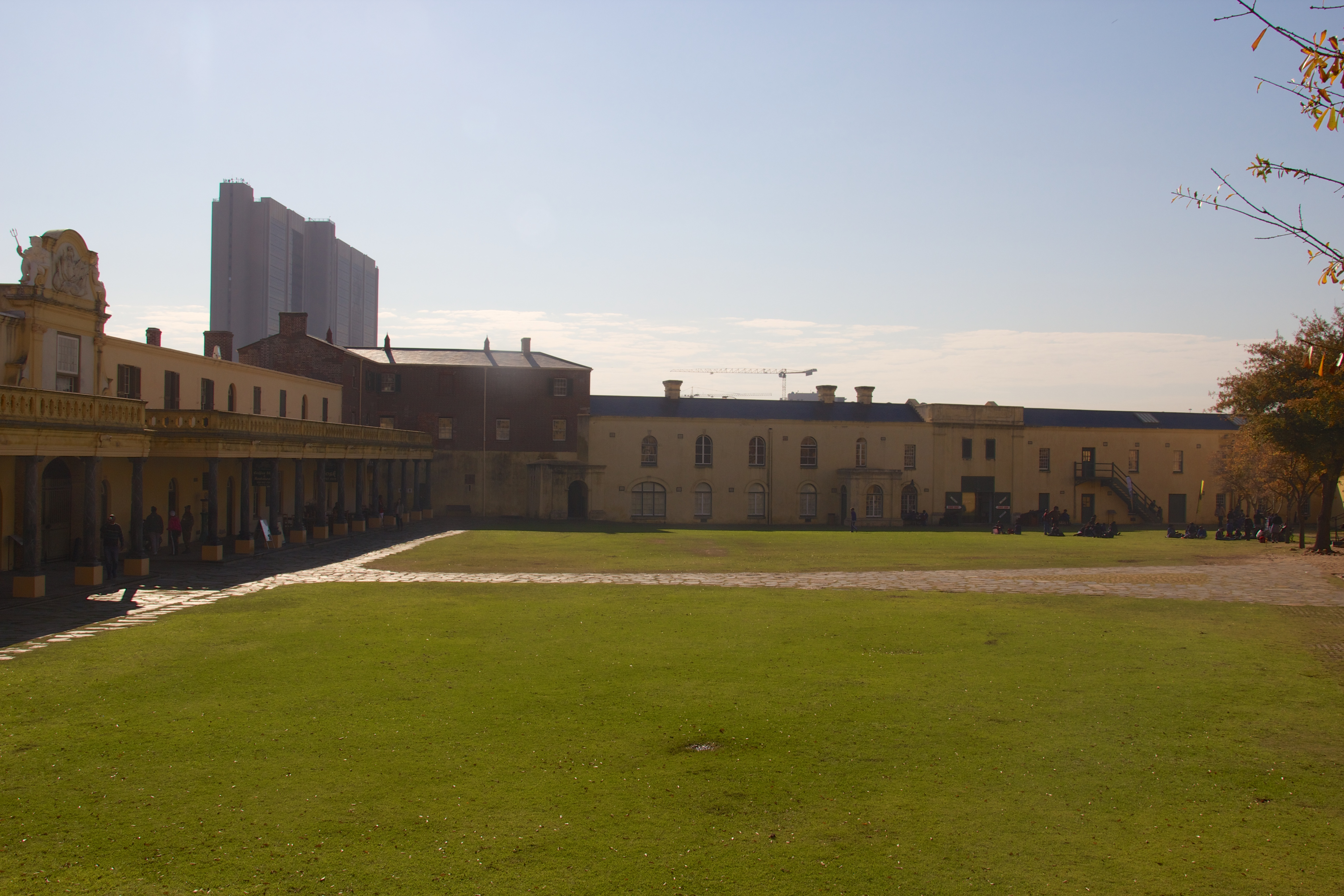
The courtyard with the main entrance on the left

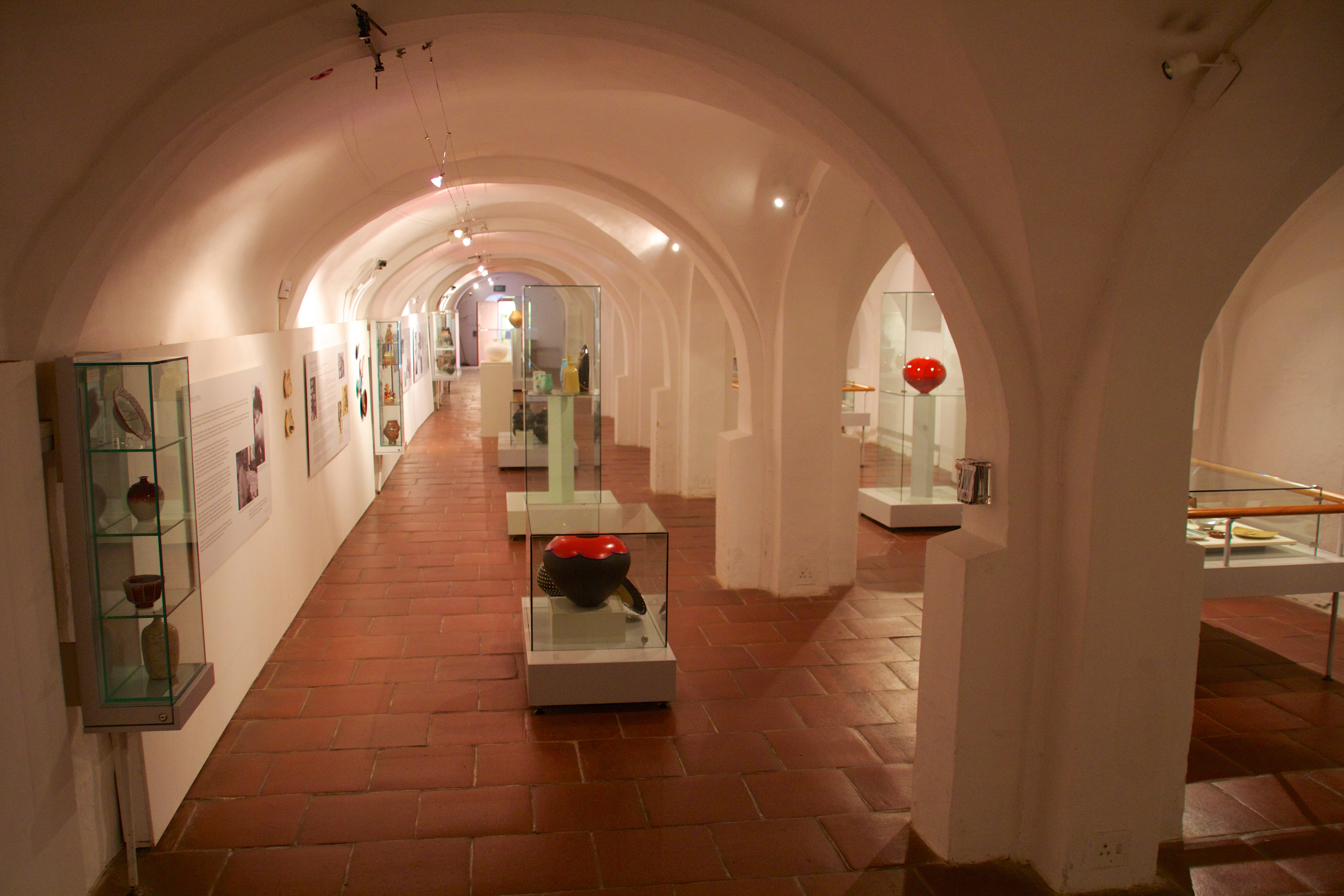
The old museum

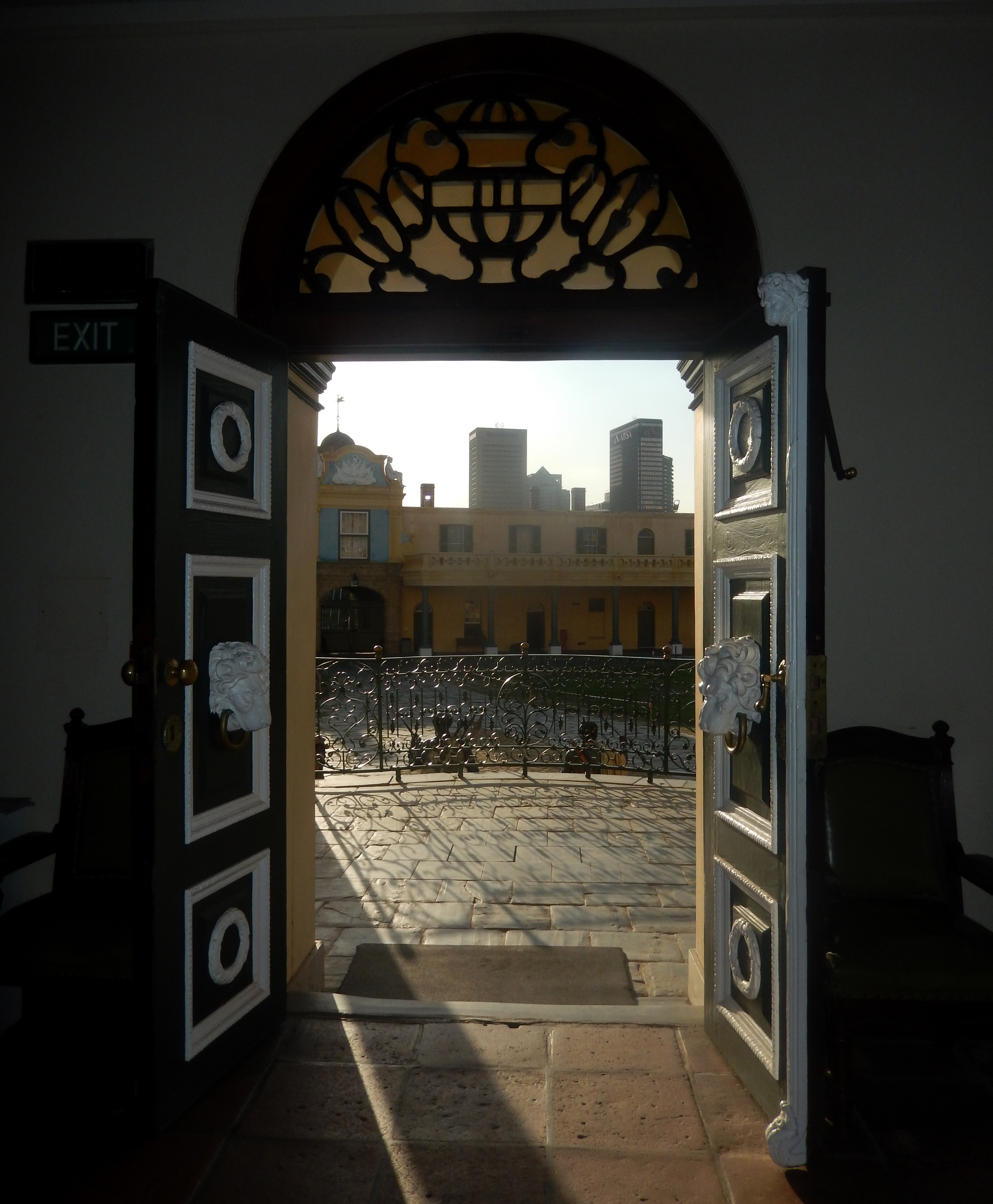
The main entrance from inside the Castle

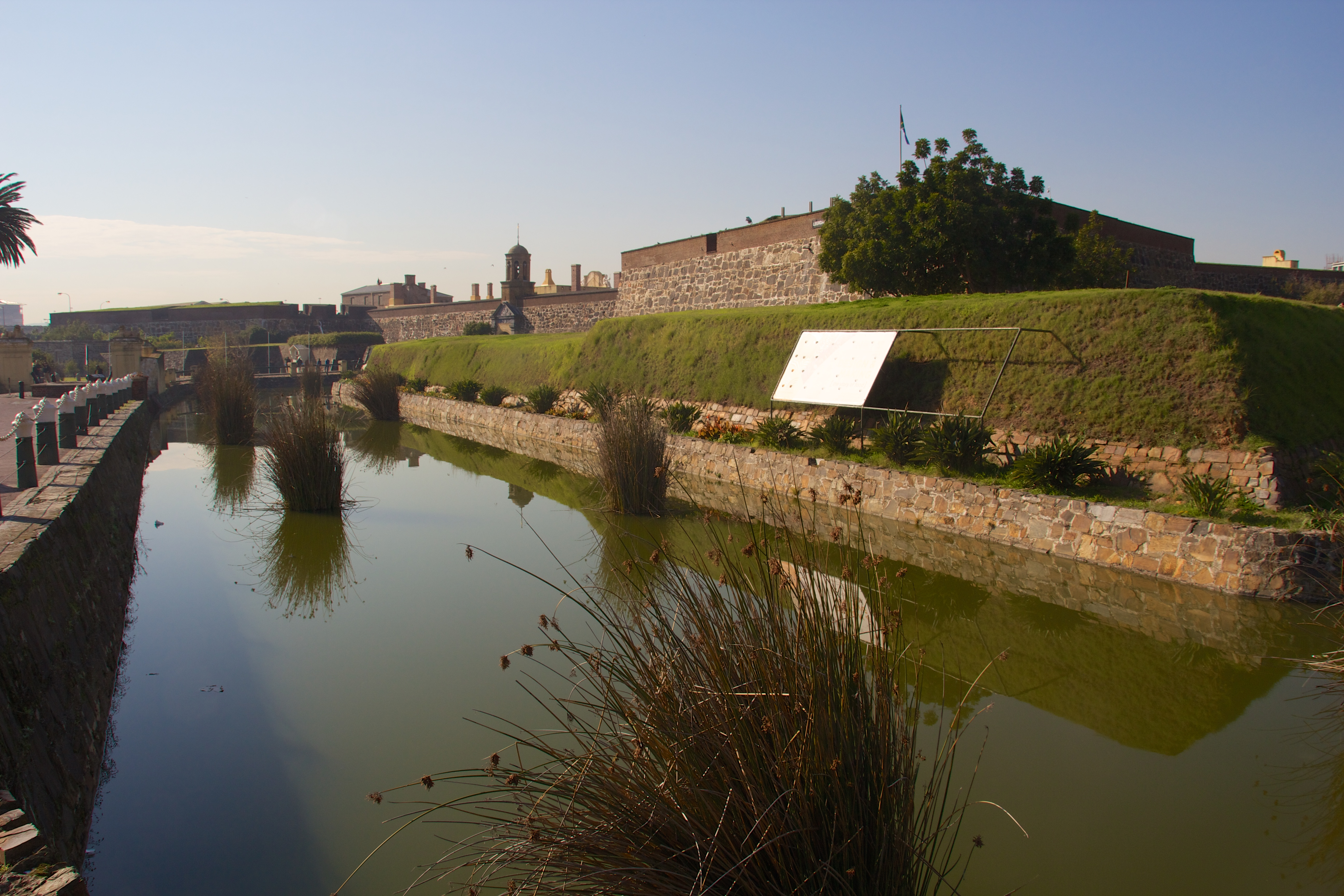
The Castle is surrounded by a canal

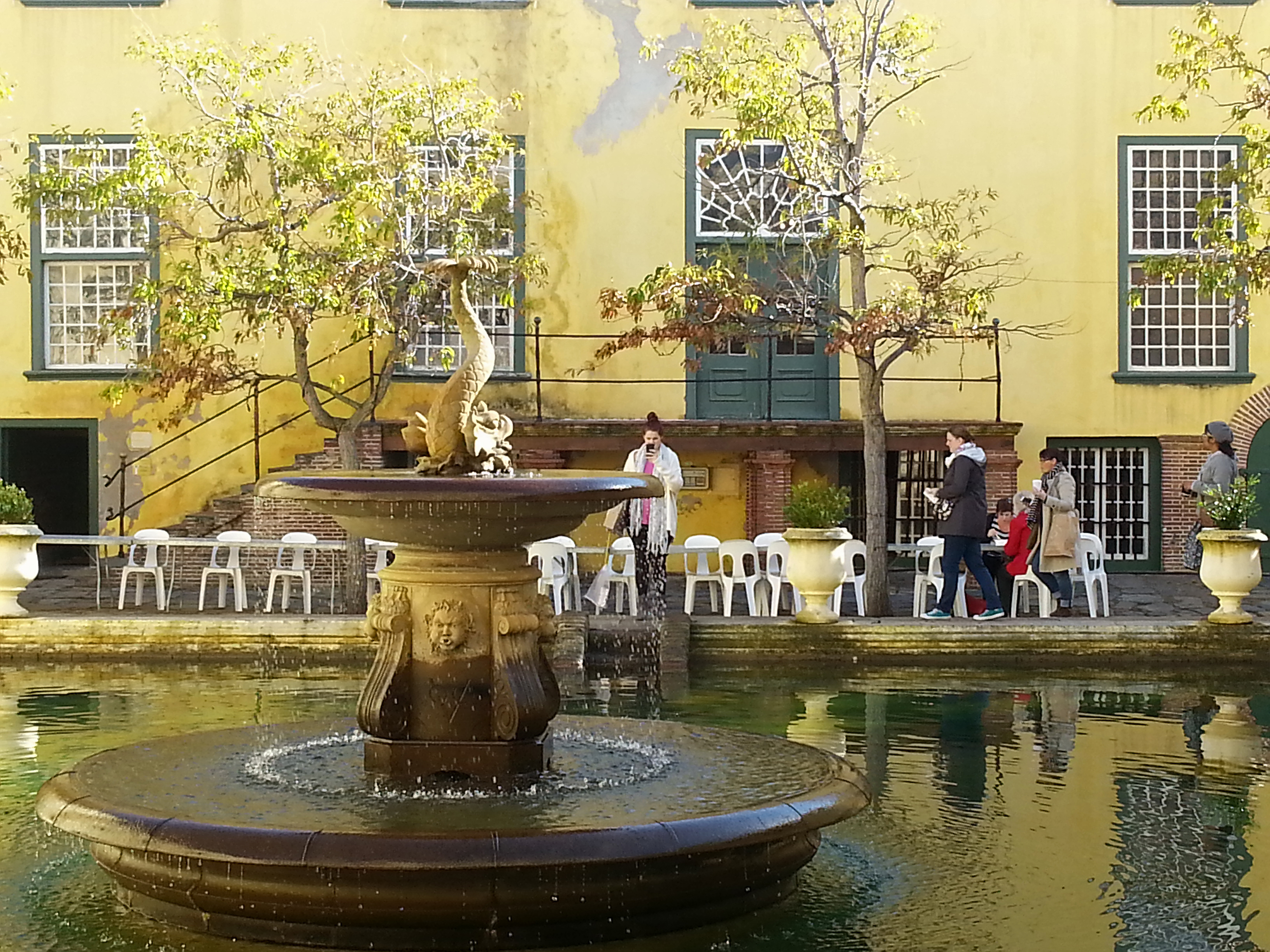
Lady Anne Barnard fountain

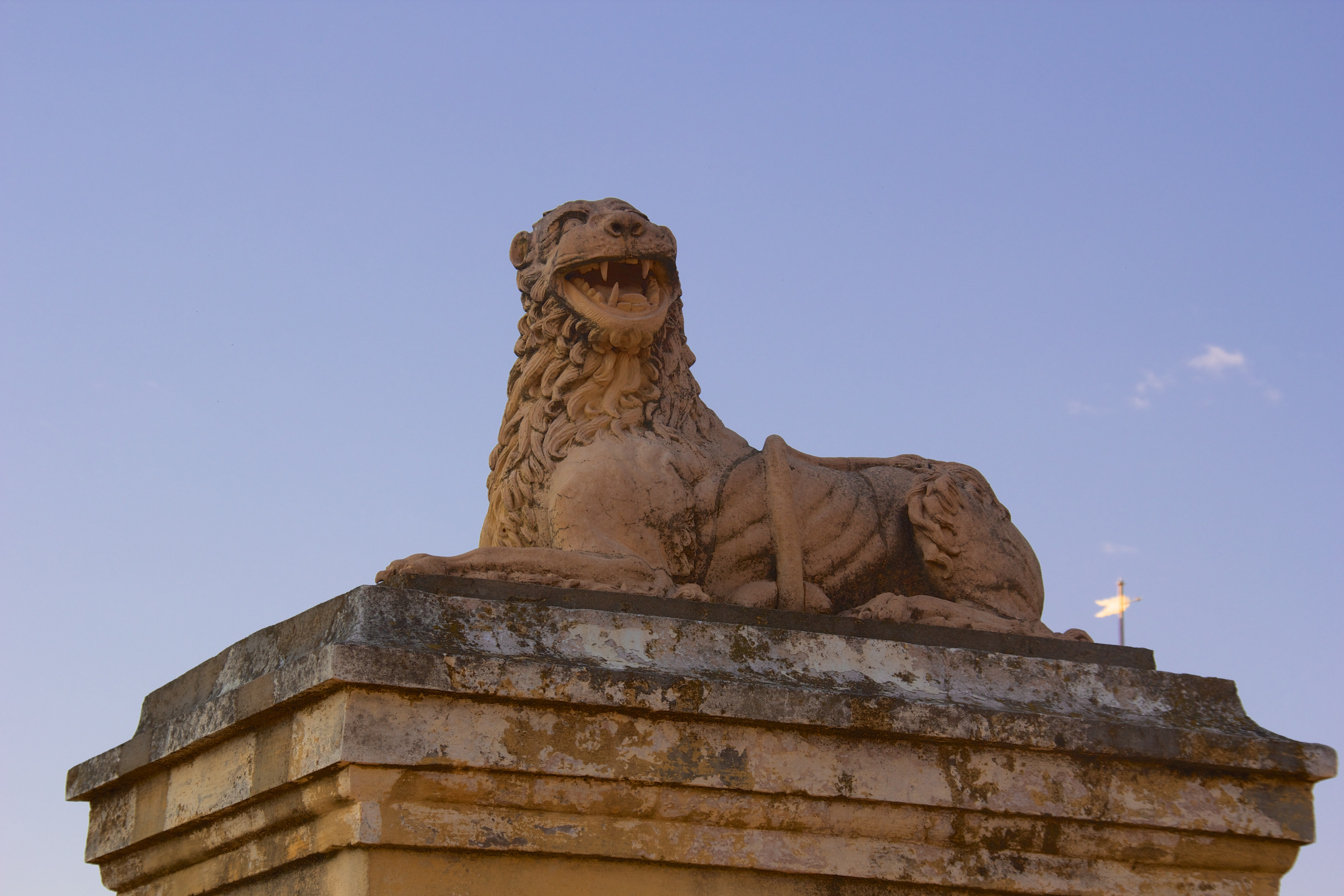

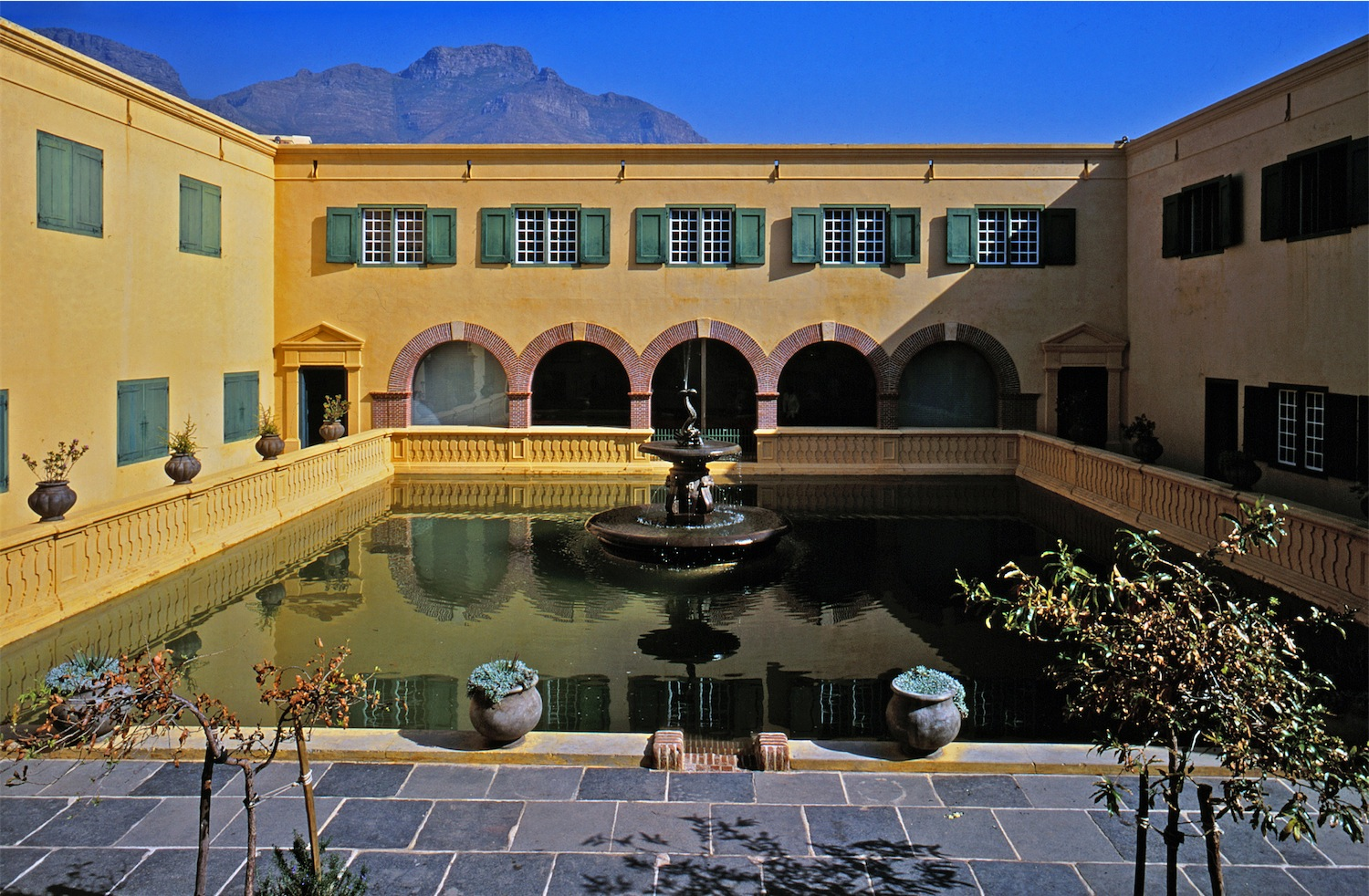
The fountain inside the Castle

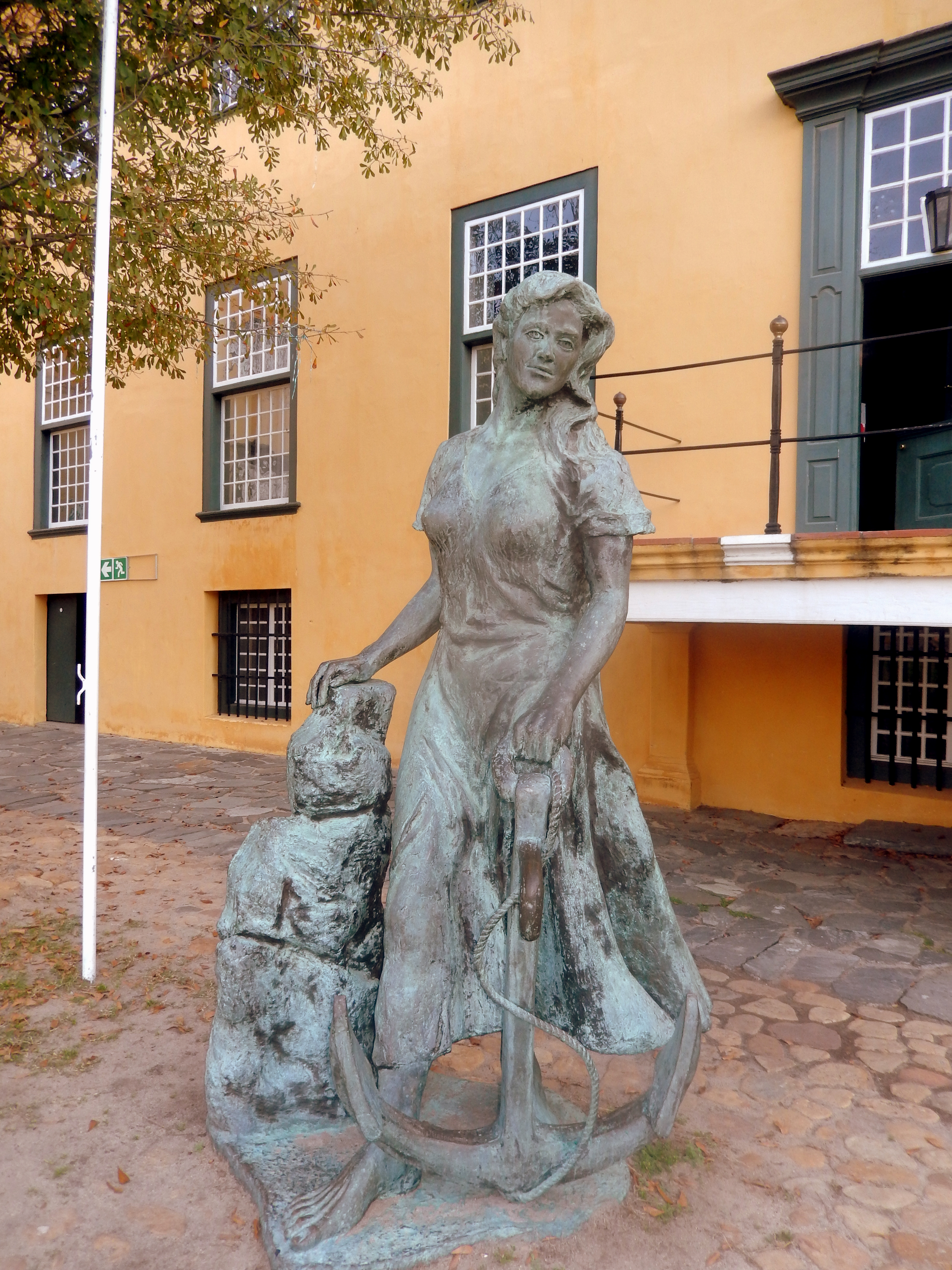
The Lady of the Cape of Good Hope Sculpture

== See also ==
- Fortifications of the Cape Peninsula
- History of Cape Colony Pre-1806
- Noon Gun
- List of castles and fortifications in South Africa
- House of Hope (fort)
