= 1662 in South Africa =

- Decades
- See also: List of years in South Africa

The following lists events that happened during 1662 in South Africa.

== Incumbents ==
- Commander of the Cape Colony - Jan van Riebeeck
- Commander of the Cape Colony - Zacharias Wagenaer

== Events ==
- Pieter Everaert discovers the Olifants River mouth.
- Doman, the leader of the Goringhaiqua Khoi-Khoi, dies.
- Zaccharias Wagenaer succeeds Jan van Riebeeck as Commander of the Cape Colony.
- Jan van Riebeeck and family depart the Table Bay for Batavia, leaving behind a fort, hospital, jetty, workshops, granary, and houses.
- The Cape settlement grows to 100 colonists.
- Roelof de Man acquires 3 Angolan slaves from Jan van Riebeeck.
