= 1663 in South Africa =

- Decades
- See also: List of years in South Africa

The following lists events that happened in 1663 in South Africa.

== Incumbents ==
- Commander of the Cape Colony - Zacharias Wagenaar

== Events ==
- The Maerseveen, a 1210-ton VOC ship, departs Texel in the Netherlands. It leaves Table Bay after a 10-day stay, heading on to Batavia.
- Two islands, Dina and Maerseveen, are discovered by the Maerseveen.
- A second school opens for colonists' children, taught by church clerk Ernestus Back.
- European settlement established at Saldanha Bay.
- Hieronymous Cruse joins Jonas de la Guerre’s failed expedition to find an overland route to the Orange River.
- The Royal African Company Charter renews its monopoly on trade, with new investors including Queen Catherine and John Locke.
- The RAC takes control of key trading posts including Cormantin, and capture Dutch settlements in Africa.

== Deaths ==
- Autsumao, interpreter & Goringhaikona chief.
- Doman, interpreter and Khoikhoi chief.
- Roelof de Man, Dutch colonial administrator.
