= 1657 in South Africa =

- Decades
- See also: List of years in South Africa

The following lists events that happened during 1657 in South Africa.

== Incumbents ==
Commander of the Cape of Good Hope - Jan van Riebeeck

== Events ==
- Nine VOC servants freed at Jan van Riebeeck's recommendation to farm along the Liesbeeck River as "free burghers."
- Free burghers become exempt from taxation, are allowed slaves, but must sell produce to the VOC, as Jan van Riebeeck seeks to meet fresh produce demands for passing ships.
- The free burghers nominate people among them who can serve as representatives at the Council meetings at the Cape. The first burgher Councillor, Steven Jansz, is appointed by Rijcklof van Goens.
- Doman, the Goringhaiqua Khoi-Khoi leader, is sent to Batavia for interpreter training.
- Jan van Riebeeck and Commissioner Rijckloff van Goens discuss Khoi-Khoi policy, and they introduce territorial segregation. Van Riebeeck also gets encouraged to continue persuading the Khoi-Khoi peacefully.
- Abraham Gabbema is sent on an investigative mission into the interior and he both discovers and names the Berg River, Diamantberg, Paarlberg, and Klapmutsberg.
- The Coornhoop farmhouse begins construction.
- Slaves are imported into the Cape Province first from West Africa, and then in more numbers from Madagascar, Ceylon, and the Dutch East Indies.
