= 1655 in South Africa =

- Decades
- See also: List of years in South Africa

The following lists events that happened during 1655 in South Africa.

== Incumbents ==
Commander of the Cape - Jan van Riebeeck

== Events ==
- The Dutch ensigned Jan Wintervogel explores the Cape interior for trade and arable land, reaching Saldanha Bay.
- Autsumao returns to the Cape after fleeing in 1653, and van Riebeeck allows him to resettle without punishment.
- Willem Muller and Autsumao explore the Hottentots Holland region for livestock trade, and Autsumao also trades on his own account.
- Maize seeds are introduced to the Cape from the Netherlands.
- The first vine is planted in the VOC's garden by Jan van Riebeeck.
- Three slaves from Madagascar arrive at the Cape.
- The first coastal vessel made of Cape timber is launched.
