= Stefanus Gie =

South African historian, politician, and diplomat (1884–1945)

Stefanus François Naudé Gie
- Born: 13 July 1884; Worcester, Cape Colony
- Died: 10 April 1945 (aged 60); Washington D.C., United States of America
- Occupations: Diplomat, civil servant
- Years active: 1906–1945
- Known for: South African minister to Germany
- Spouse: Johanna Jordaan
- Children: 3

Stefanus François Naudé Gie (13 July 1884 – 10 April 1945) was a South African historian, politician, and diplomat.

== Educator ==
Gie was born in Worcester, Cape Colony (now the Western Cape province) to an Afrikaner family. He was of Dutch, French and German descent. His parents were Coenraad Johannes Carolus Gie and Martha Naude. Gie was educated at the Worcester Boys High School and at the Victoria College (now Stellenbosch University) in Stellenbosch. Subsequently, he studied at the University of Amsterdam and at Humboldt University of Berlin, where he received his PhD. Gie's PhD supervisor was Friedrich Meinecke, one of the most famous German historians of his generation. Gie's PhD thesis was Die Kanditatur Ludwigs XIV bei der Kaiserwahl vom Jahre 1658, concerning the candidacy of King Louis XIV of France for the office of Holy Roman Emperor in 1658.

Between 1906 and 1909, he worked as a teacher in Cradock and Worcester. In 1910, he was promoted to Inspector of Schools. In 1911, he became the Principal of the Teachers’ Training College in Graaff-Reinett. Gie married Johanna Jordaan and had three sons, namely Coenraad, Johan, and Gert. As an Afrikaner nationalist, he was keen to promote cultural projects that would uphold a sense of Afrikaner identity. In 1915, he was a founding member of the Letterkundige en Toneel Vereniging theater company in Graaff-Reinet. Gie served as both a director and an actor with the Letterkundige en Toneel Vereniging company.

In 1918, he became the first ever professor of South African History at Stellenbosch University, rising up to become the Chair of the South African History department at Stellenbosch. The South African historian W.S. Barnard described Gie as "a sophisticated, but ardent Afrikaner nationalist" who successfully championed to have the language of instruction at Stellenbosch changed from Dutch to Afrikaans.

Gie became the foremost Afrikaner historian of his generation, one of the first professionally trained Afrikaner historians who set out to give the increasing literate Afrikaners a history that they could be proud of. As the Boers were generally illiterate in the 19th century, writing on South African history tended to be either the work of British historians or Anglos (South African whites of British descent). The dominant historical model for South African history-writing in the early 20th century was to portray South Africa as merely a part of the British empire, albeit an especially important part. Gie and other Afrikaner historians sought to challenge this model and instead put forward the thesis of the volksgeskiedenis ("people's history") that saw South African history as a subject in its own right and placed the Afrikaners in the center of the story.

Gie saw himself as one of the leaders of "scientific-objective" history, stating in a 1920 speech to his students at Stellenbosch that to be a "scientific" historian required an "honest and objective" outlook, which could only be gained via "hard work and experience". Gie become one of the principal promoters of "scientific-objective history", which became the dominant model for history writing in Afrikaans in South Africa until the end of apartheid in 1994. Gie saw history as a social science where historians would work just like scientists in discovering the underlining social forces in their society to offer up "scientific" explanations for historical developments in a purely "objective" and neutral manner. The South African historian Albert Grundlingh wrote this model of "scientific-objective history" that so dominated history writing in South Africa was largely an attempt for South African historians to hide their biases behind a spurious façade of "objectivity" that was said to be grounded in the pure rationality of science itself. Grundlingh noted that despite the claims of "objective-scientific" historians to be offering up "scientific" explanations that such historians in practice tended to avoid analytical writing, instead preferring to give a description of what happened in the past instead of why. Grundlingh also noted in the "scientific-objective history", the focus was on political as opposed to social history, which gave the rather misleading impression that the Boers/Afrikaners were more united than was often the case, promoting an "us vs. them" narrative of the history of the volk as a series of struggles against their enemies. The Kenyan historian Munene Mwaniki noted that the "scientific-objective" history was heavily influenced by the ideals of "scientific" history promoted by Leopold von Ranke that was very popular in Europe, especially in Germany and the Netherlands, as most of the Afrikaner historians such as Gie were educated in either the Netherlands and/or in Germany. Mwaniki noted that in the "scientific-objective" histories the focus tended to be on "national" history with a strong focus on political and military history; that such histories tended to be descriptive rather than analytical; and that blacks only appeared in these histories with regard to military history as the opponents of the Boers and were otherwise absent from South African history.

Because of his training in the Netherlands and Germany, Gie had "an almost obsessive Rankian approach" to history and he held to the distinction commonly held in European universities at the time between anthropology and history. For Gie, anthropology was the scientific study of "illiterate and barbarian masses" vs. history which for him was the scientific study of the pasts of "civilized nations". Thus for Gie, South African history was the history of South African whites while the history of black South Africans was anthropology. Gie defined his interests as the study of "civilized" and "white" South Africans as he wrote that the volksgeskiedenis ("people's history") was really the "History of European Civilization in South Africa". The volksgeskiedenis defined the history of the Afrikaners as a story of larger-than-life leaders who heroically led their tough and hardy people deep into the veld to create "civilization". During his time at Stellenbosh, he wrote what became his 1928 book Geskiedenis van Suid-Afrika, of Ons Verlede (History of South Africa, of Our Past), which he later retitled Geskiedenis van Suid-Afrika, 1652–1795 (History of South Africa, 1652–1795). A second volume entitled Geskiedenis van Suid-Afrika, 1795-1918 was later published. Geskiedenis van Suid-Afrika became the favorite history book of the Afrikaner nationalists. In 1940 Geskiedenis van Suid-Afrika became mandatory reading for high school students in South Africa.

Most notably, for Gie, South African history began when the first Dutch settlers arrived in 1652 and before 1652 South Africa quite literally had no history. Gie openly admitted that he ignored the history of "the native" because to tell "the Civilized History of South Africa" required taking into account the connection between "the white man and the old cultural circles over the sea". Gie wrote that to own the land required working the land, and as such he argued that the indigenous Khoekhoe nomadic pastoralists whom he called by the very disparaging name "Hottentots" had no right to any land ownership because of their nomadic lifestyle together with what he called their "politics of robbery". Gie wrote: "no individual or nation has absolute rights to the land. If someone wants to remain in possession he must display his right through his use of the land. A nation is obliged to make as much use of his land as is possible for the service of humanity". In this way, Gie argued that the "Hottentots" as he called the Khoekhoe had no right to the land that they were living on. By contrast, he argued that the Dutch settlers, who were joined later on in the 17th century by French Huguenot refugees and German settlers, were the "legitimate" owners of the land because they were the "workers of the land".

Gie played an important role in promoting the idea that Jan van Riebeeck who founded the Dutch East India Company's fort at what is now Cape Town was the founder of South Africa. Gie wrote that van Riebeeck was the "founder of our South Africa, the South Africa of the white man". By contrast, Riebeeck's wife, Maria van Riebeeck, became for Gie a symbol of the "good breeding" that marked the beginning of the "white race" in South Africa as well becoming a symbol of domesticity that he saw as desirable for Afrikaner women. Gie was one of the leaders of the campaign to make 6 April-the day that van Riebeeck landed at Cape Town in 1652-into a public holiday as for him this was the beginning of South African history itself. A sign of Gie's influence was in 1938 when the South African government to mark the 100th anniversary of the Great Trek of 1838 organised a reenactment of the Great Trek with oxen pulling wagons carrying actors dressed in the style of the 19th century Boers. Significantly, the reenactment of the Great Trek did not begin where it actually began, namely Graaff-Reinet and the other towns of the eastern Cape Province, but rather in Cape Town at the foot of a statue of van Riebeeck, thus presenting a line of continuity between the founding of Cape Town in 1652 and the Great Trek of 1838, even through there is no evidence to suggest that van Riebeeck ever envisioned sending settlers deep into the veld of South Africa. Gie was a member of the National Party, the Afrikaner nationalist party that represented the 'republican' (i.e. anti-British) tendency as well as the Broederbond, a secretive and elitist group of male Afrikaner intellectuals. About his involvement in the Broederbond, Gie wrote: "It was especially their work, their upholding of the white man's honor [emphasis in the original], their courage, patience, and sense of freedom which gave us a South Africa where we can be happy, free and prosperous".

In 1926, he became the South African Secretary of Education. In 1927, he was the driving force behind passing the Architects Act that regulated the training of architects in South Africa. One South African architect, Geoffrey Pearse recalled: "Under the Act a Board of Education was set up. At its first meeting Dr Gie, Secretary for Education was present to discuss the educational requirements of the Institute and particularly the entrance qualifications of students. When I proposed that the Matriculation examination should be accepted this was opposed by Mr Howden, President in Chief of the Institute of South African Architects and Mr. Moore, the Vice President, who did not think this was necessary. I was amused when Dr Gie folded up his papers and said that under the circumstances the training of architects could be undertaken by the Technical Colleges. This was a shock to the opposition who finally agreed that all architectural education should be undertaken by the Universities and that the Matriculation examination should be the entrance qualification."

== Diplomat ==
From 1934 to 1939, he served as the South African minister-plenipotentiary to Germany. Gie was a Germanophile who very much enjoyed his positing in Berlin, the city where he was awarded his PhD. Gie embraced Nazism. In his dispatches to Pretoria he portrayed the Nazi regime in the most favorable light possible while constantly going on about alleged "conspiracies" by the Jews against Germany. Gie attributed to the Jews vast and sinister powers to manipulate world politics and economies, and in his reading of events Germany was forever the victim of the Jews. The Prime Minister J. B. M. Hertzog did not share Gie's antisemitism, but the mostly positive picture of the Third Reich presented by Gie was used by the prime minister to support his foreign policy. Hertzog also worked as his own foreign minister, and all of Gie's dispatches went straight to him. Hertzog was not anti-Semitic, but he was an ardent Germanophile. The deputy Prime Minister, Jan Smuts was a Christian Zionist who worked closely with various Zionist leaders, and he had an anti-anti-Semitic viewpoint. As a consequence, Gie's relations with Smuts were difficult as Gie was openly hostile towards Smut's Zionism.

In January 1935, the German cruiser Emden visited Cape Town, South Africa's chief seaport, where the South African Defense minister Oswald Pirow arrived to welcome Karl Dönitz, the captain of the Emden, to South Africa. In a speech to the crew of the Emden, Pirow stated:

"Germany as a civilised state, is one of the chief exponents of our Western culture, which can be maintained only by white peoples, and preserved only by the united co-operation of all. Today, more than ever, when the rising tide of the colored races is reaching higher and higher, the active help of a strong Germany is more than ever necessary. For us in South Africa the maintenance and spread of our white civilisation is a question of life and death. In this sense, I express the hope that Germany will again soon become a colonial power in Africa".

Pirow's speech was ignored at first being only reported in the Cape Argus newspaper until the British journalist George Ward Price, the "extra-special correspondent" of the Daily Mail, brought it up in an interview with Adolf Hitler. In response, Hitler stated: "Until it has been confirmed I should not like to pass any opinion. I will only say that if South Africa or any other government would offer to give us back any of our colonies we would accept them willingly". At that point, the speech became the subject of much debate both within South Africa and in Great Britain, where it was felt to be an offer to return Southwest Africa (modern Namibia) to Germany.

In the British Foreign Office, it was believed that Hitler was "testing the weaker vessel first" as a gambit to force the British, the French and the Belgians to return the former German African colonies. Pirow denied in the South African parliament that the South African government was planning to return Southwest Africa. Pirow maintained that he was only expressing the wish that Germany have a colonial empire in Africa again. According to the British embassy in Berlin which had learned of the contents of a meeting between Johan Paul van Limburg Stirum, the Dutch minister plenipotentiary to Germany, and Gie, Pirow's speech was not an off-hand statement, but rather the beginning of a new policy as Hertzog felt that having Germany return as a colonial power in Africa was crucial "for the future safety of the white population". According to the source, Hertzog was planning to keep Southwest Africa and also felt that Britain should not return either Tanganyika (modern Tanzania) or Cameroon to Germany. However, the source reported that for Hertzog it would be "ideal" if Germany could take over the Portuguese colonies in Africa, and that it was in this sense that Pirow's speech should be understood.

On 22 October 1935, Gie wrote to the Secretary of External Affairs, Helgard Bodenstein, that the South African Legation in Berlin was being overwhelmed with German Jews seeking to immigrate to South Africa. Gie had an extremely negative view of the German Jews who were lining up in front of the legation on every weekday, writing to Bodenstein that he thought that most of them were Communists, and even those who were not he doubted would fit in very well into South Africa. Gie was in frequent contact with Eric Louw, the South African minister-plenipotentiary in Paris, who shared his antisemitism. In January 1936, Louw submitted to Hertzog a "Memorandum on European Emigration To South Africa" that was co-signed by himself; Gie; Charles te Water, the High Commissioner in London; Wilhelm Heymans, the minister-plenipotentiary in Rome; and Hermann van Broekhuizen, the minister-plenipotentiary in The Hague. The memo is more commonly known as the "te Water Memorandum" as te Water was the best known South African diplomat in the world at the time. The memo warned that South Africa was on the verge of receiving a massive number of European Jews, which the document stated were of "...a type in question that does not inspire confidence. Can South Africa without detriment and even danger to its national interests continue to allow its commerce and related vocations to be fed by recruits of this type from overseas?" The memo ended with the warning that continuing Jewish immigration would affect "the future racial, social and economic structures of White South Africa", and advised ending Jewish immigration at once.

In 1936, Gie took part in the celebrations of the 450th anniversary of Heidelberg university, representing both South Africa as the minister to Germany and representing Stellenbosch University as a noted alumni and former professor. The 1936 celebrations of the 450th anniversary of the founding of Heidelberg university in 1386 were highly controversial with all French universities; almost all British universities led by Oxford and Cambridge universities; and all Canadian universities boycotting the celebrations under the grounds that in Nazi Germany academic freedom did not exist. Most American universities boycotted the celebrations through Harvard, Yale, Cornell and Columbia universities all sent delegations led by their university presidents to praise the process of academic life at Heidelberg under the Nazi regime. The English language South African universities boycotted the celebrations at Heidelberg, but the Afrikaans language South African universities all sent delegations to take part in the celebrations. Gie's own remarks in praise of academic life at Heidelberg under the Third Reich were very controversial at the time and since.

In August 1938, Gie reported to Pretoria that Germany only wanted autonomy for the Sudetenland and was not seeking to annex the Sudetenland. Gie stated if the Czechoslovak president Edvard Beneš was willing to accept the "Karlsbad programme" put forward by the Sudeten German leader Konrad Henlein on 24 April 1938 calling for a wide-ranging autonomy for the Sudetenland, the crisis would be settled. Gie stated it was his impression after talking to Hitler-whom he called the "Olympian Jove"-and his entourage that they did not want a war, but "they will, however, not stand for overmuch Czech intransigence. If the Czechs want a war, they'll get it". Only on 12 September 1938 in a speech to the Nazi Party Congress in Nuremberg did Hitler call for the Sudetenland to "go home to the Reich".

During the height of the Sudetenland crisis in September 1938, Gie depicted Hitler in the words of the Canadian historian Michael Graham Fry as "volatile, oratorically violent, risk acceptant, fanatically determined and difficult to predict". Gie felt that Hitler was only reacting to the system by the Treaty of Versailles, but warned it was quite possible that he would order an invasion of Czechoslovakia at any given moment. After the Munich Agreement of 30 September 1938, Gie believed that there was a real possibility of an Anglo-German understanding that might secure the peace of the world. Like te Water in London, Gie had hopes that Neville Chamberlain's plans for a four power pact consisting of Britain, France, Italy and Germany might be realised with the United Kingdom and the Reich as the senior members. Both Gie and te Water believed that such a four power directory would regulate European and African affairs and kept the dreaded Soviet Union, the nation that South African leaders feared the most, at bay. South African elites in common with elites throughout the Commonwealth had an intense fear of another Anglo-German war, believing that it would so weaken the two leading "white" powers that whoever was victorious would be so weakened as to be unable to resist the Soviet Union. In turn, the dominance of the Soviet Union would allow so-called "inferior races" to take over the world as Sir Nevile Henderson, the British ambassador to Germany, put it. Gie warned of dangerous forces at work in both Britain and Germany, one of them being "the Hitler of Godesburg and his Sportspalast speech". However, Gie wrote with the Munich Agreement ending the Sudetenland crisis there was nothing at present that would justify a war for the next "two years at least".

During the Danzig crisis, Gie largely supported the German viewpoint that the Free City of Danzig (modern Gdańsk, Poland) should be allowed to "go home to the Reich". In a dispatch to Herzog on 3 May 1939, Gie wrote that the German claim to Danzig was "just and right", and accused Poland of being the principle danger to the peace of the world. Gie also stated that he believed that Adolf Hitler did not intend to start a war, but that German public opinion might push him into a rash move, especially if the Poles continued to refuse to allow Danzig to rejoin Germany. The British Foreign Secretary Lord Halifax who had just read a briefing on the history of Danzig wrote after reading a dispatch from Gie passed on to him by te Water that Gie "should learn some history". Throughout the Danzig crisis, Gie was in close contact with Charles te Water, the South African High Commissioner in London as the two diplomats worked together to ensure South Africa would be neutral if the crisis led to war. Gie was one of the relatively few diplomats in Berlin with whom the British ambassador Sir Nevile Henderson associated with during the Danzig crisis. The other two diplomats whom Henderson often saw were the Belgian minister Vicomte Jacques Davignon and the Italian ambassador Baron Bernardo Attolico. Davignon, Attolico and Gie were all supporters of the line that the Free City of Danzig should be allowed to "go home to the Reich", which was also Henderson's long-standing belief. By contrast, Henderson avoided seeing very much of either the Polish ambassador Józef Lipski or the French ambassador Robert Coulondre, both of whom were stoutly opposed to allowing the Free City to rejoin Germany.

Gie very briefly served as the South African minister plenipotentiary to the Netherlands in 1939. From 1939 to 1944, he served as the South African minister plenipotentiary to Sweden and in 1944–1945, he served as the South African minister to the United States, where he died from a cerebral hemorrhage.

== Sources ==
- Bartrop, Paul (2021). "Avoiding War? British Diplomacy and the Outbreak of War in 1939". In Paul Bartrop (ed.). The Routledge History of the Second World War. London: Routledge. pp. 3–18. ISBN 978-1138317086.
- Barnard, W. S (2016). Encountering Adamastor South Africa's Founding Geographers in Time and Place · Volume 1. Johannesburg: African Sun Media. ISBN 9781928357278.
- Britz, Dolf (2015). "The Portrayal of the 1858 Boer-Basotho War in South African Historigraphy". In Michel Prum, Jamary ʼMatlaselo Molumeli (ed.). Missionary Work in Africa in Eugène Casalis's Time and Beyond. Cambridge: Cambridge University Press. pp. 29–68. ISBN 9781443881876.
- Crozier, Andrew (1988). Appeasement And Germany's Last Bid For Colonies. Oxford: Springer. ISBN 1349192554.
- Doherty, Julian Campbell (July 1972). "Die Dominions und die britische Außenpolitik von München bis zum Kriegsausbruch 1939". Vierteljahrshefte für Zeitgeschichte. 20 (3): 209–232.
- Graham Fry, Michael (1999). "Agents and Structures: The Dominions and the Czechoslovak Crisis, September 1938". In Igor Lukes; Erik Goldstein (eds.). The Munich Crisis, 1938 Prelude to World War II. London: Frank Cass. pp. 293–321. ISBN 0-7146-8056-7.
- Grundlingh, Albert (2020). "Pitfalls of a Profession: Afrikaner historians and the notion of an "objective-scientific" approach in perspective". In Cyrill Walters, Jonathan D. Jansen (ed.). Fault Lines A Primer on Race, Science and Society. Stellenbosch: African Sun Media. pp. 93–100. ISBN 9781928480488.
- Jackson, Timothy (2017). "The Company You Keep: Recipients of Honorary Doctorates from the 1936 Heidelberg Celebrations-Sibelius and Those Honored Alongside Him". In Daniel M. Grimley; Veijo Murtomäki; Timo Virtanen; Tim Howell (eds.). Jean Sibelius's Legacy Research on his 150th Anniversary. Cambridge: Cambridge University Press. pp. 86–110. ISBN 978-1-5275-0087-7.
- Mwaniki, Munene (2012). Multilingualism and the Public Sector in South Africa. Johannesburg: Sun Press. ISBN 9781920383244.
- Shain, Milton (2015). A Perfect Storm: Antisemitism in South Africa 1930–1948. Cape Town: Jonathan Ball Publishers. ISBN 978-1-86842-701-7.
- Witz, Leslie (2003). Apartheid's Festival Contesting South Africa's National Pasts. Bloomington: Indiana University Press. ISBN 978-0-253-02831-0.
