= 1658 in South Africa =

- Decades
- See also: List of years in South Africa

The following lists events that happened during 1658 in South Africa.

== Incumbents ==
Commander of the Cape Colony - Jan van Riebeeck

== Events ==
- Start of the slave trade at the Cape:

The ship Amersfoort arrives in Table Bay with 174 slaves. 38 men and 37 women remain at the Cape, while most are sent to Batavia.

The ship Hasselt arrives in Table Bay with 228 slaves from Dahomey, and most of them are shipped to Batavia.

- Jan van Riebeeck banishes Autsumao to Robben Island.
