= 1659 in South Africa =

- Decades
- See also: List of years in South Africa

The following is a list of events that happened during 1659 in South Africa.

== Incumbents ==
- Governor of the Cape Colony - Jan van Riebeeck

== Events ==
- The first Khoikhoi-Dutch War begins over land ownership. The Doman-led Khoikhoi attempt to steal cattle from Dutch settlers.
- The Dutch settlers take refuge in a fortification, and the Khoikhoi lose more land due to their lack of unity.
- Jan van Riebeeck calls a meeting of the VOC's Cape Council of Policy on 19 May to deliberate on their course of action.
- Jan van Riebeeck and the Council commence the construction of the Kijkuijt, Keert de Koe, and Ruijterwacht, redoubts connected by timber fences in order to fortify the borders of the VOC's occupation against the Khoikhoi.
- The first Cape wine is pressed, and Jan van Riebeeck records a harvest of 12 mengelen (14 liters) of must.
- The first of five expeditions, sent to find the land of the Namaquas, are sent out.
