= Coree the Saldanian =

- Xhore
- Died: c. 1626–1627; Cape of Good Hope, southern Africa
- Known for: Victim of abduction, first intermediary between Europeans and indigenous Khoekhoe communities

Coree the Saldanian (died c. 1626–1627) was a Khoekhoe man from the Cape of Good Hope region of southern Africa who was abducted by English sailors connected with the East India Company in 1613. He and an unnamed man were the first of a series of Khoikhoi kidnapped by Europeans in the 17th century, although the unnamed man died shortly after. Coree survived and was taken to England where merchants attempted to teach him English to serve as an interpreter and intermediary between the English and the Khoikhoi.

In England, Coree stayed at the house of the East India Company governor Sir Thomas Smythe. Coree resented his time in England, and was reported to regularly lie on the ground and cry "Coree home go, Souldania go, home go."

After his return to the Cape in 1614, Coree served a broker between European ships and Khoekhoe communities, but English records observed his experience in England had taught him the value of European goods, which made Khoikhoi trade harder for Europeans, resulting in better deals for the Khoikhoi. Recollections also observed that his resentment of his treatment in England made it more difficult for the Europeans to procure livestock. Coree later encouraged the Europeans to attack Khoikhoi rivals, and build his flocks and herds.

Coree is generally reported to have died sometime between 1626 and 1627, possibly having been killed by the Duch for apparently refusing to give them food.

== See also ==
- Autshumato
- Krotoa
- Khoekhoe
- History of Cape Colony before 1806
