= 1656 in South Africa =

- Decades
- See also: List of years in South Africa

The following lists events that happened during 1656 in South Africa.

== Incumbents ==
Commander of the Cape Colony - Jan van Riebeeck

== Events ==
- For the first time a Cape slave, Catharina Anthonis, is freed to marry a Dutch settler, Jan Woutersz.
- Additional farming land for the VOC's garden is prepared at Rondebosch.
