= Statue of Jan van Riebeeck =

Sculpture by John Tweed in Cape Town, South Africa

Coordinates: 33°55′9.6″S 18°25′33.4″E

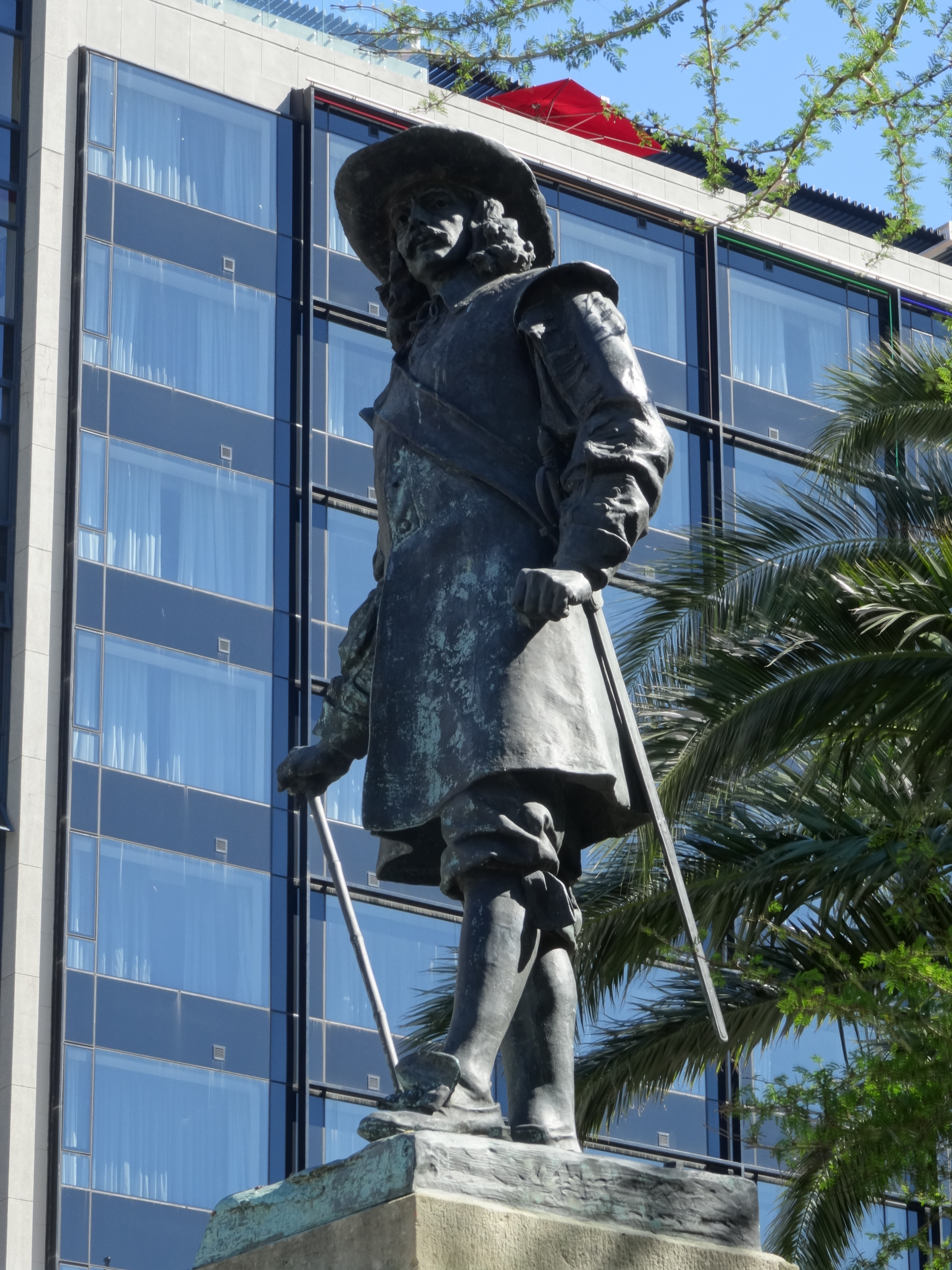
Statue of Jan van Riebeeck

The statue of Jan van Riebeeck stands alongside the statue of Maria van Riebeeck on Heerengracht Street in Cape Town, South Africa. Both statues stand with their backs to the sea, looking south to Table Mountain.

The statue was donated by Cecil Rhodes to the city of Cape Town. He paid the Scottish sculptor John Tweed £1,000 for the work, partly on the condition that the statue not show Tweed's name and be larger than life-size. The statue lies on a Cape granite pedestal 4¼ m high, designed by an architect friend of Tweed's. This further inflated the cost.

On 18 May 1899, Cape Town Mayor Thomas Ball unveiled the bronze statue in the presence of the entire City Council, national politicians, and members of the public, but in the absence of Rhodes, then sojourning in Europe.

Rhodes chose to situate the statue where Van Riebeeck set foot ashore. Due to the development of the harbour and the city's growth, the statue has been overshadowed by skyscrapers. Over time, a large roundabout was developed at the site, once called Heerengracht, and in 1969, a statue of Maria van Riebeeck was placed to the right of her husband's.

There is no image that can be said to certainly depict the founder of the Cape refreshment station. In the statue, Van Riebeeck's sword is sheathed, and he carries his walking stick in his right hand. The dress in the statue is historically inaccurate. Overhanging shoulder straps were out of fashion in the mid-17th century, and knee breeches and the jacket Van Riebeeck is wearing only became popular after he departed for Java. Hat feathers were in fashion, but are missing in the statue.

Each year on 6 April, Founders Day, wreaths were laid at the statues of Jan and Maria van Riebeeck.

In his poem, "Oor monnemente gepraat" ("speaking of monuments"), Peter Blum writes:

Here is Jan van Riebeeck, very handsome in his plus fours; ....

In Van Riebeeck's birthplace of Culemborg is a bust of Van Riebeeck, donated by the Cape Town City Council.

== Bibliography ==
- Standard Encyclopaedia of Southern Africa, vol. 11. Cape Town: Nasou, 1975. ISBN 0-625-00327-6
- Van Tonder, J.J. (ed.). Veertien gedenktekens van Suid-Afrika. Cape Town: N.B.B., 1961.
