= Statue of Maria van Riebeeck =

Sculpture by Dirk Wolbers in Cape Town, South Africa

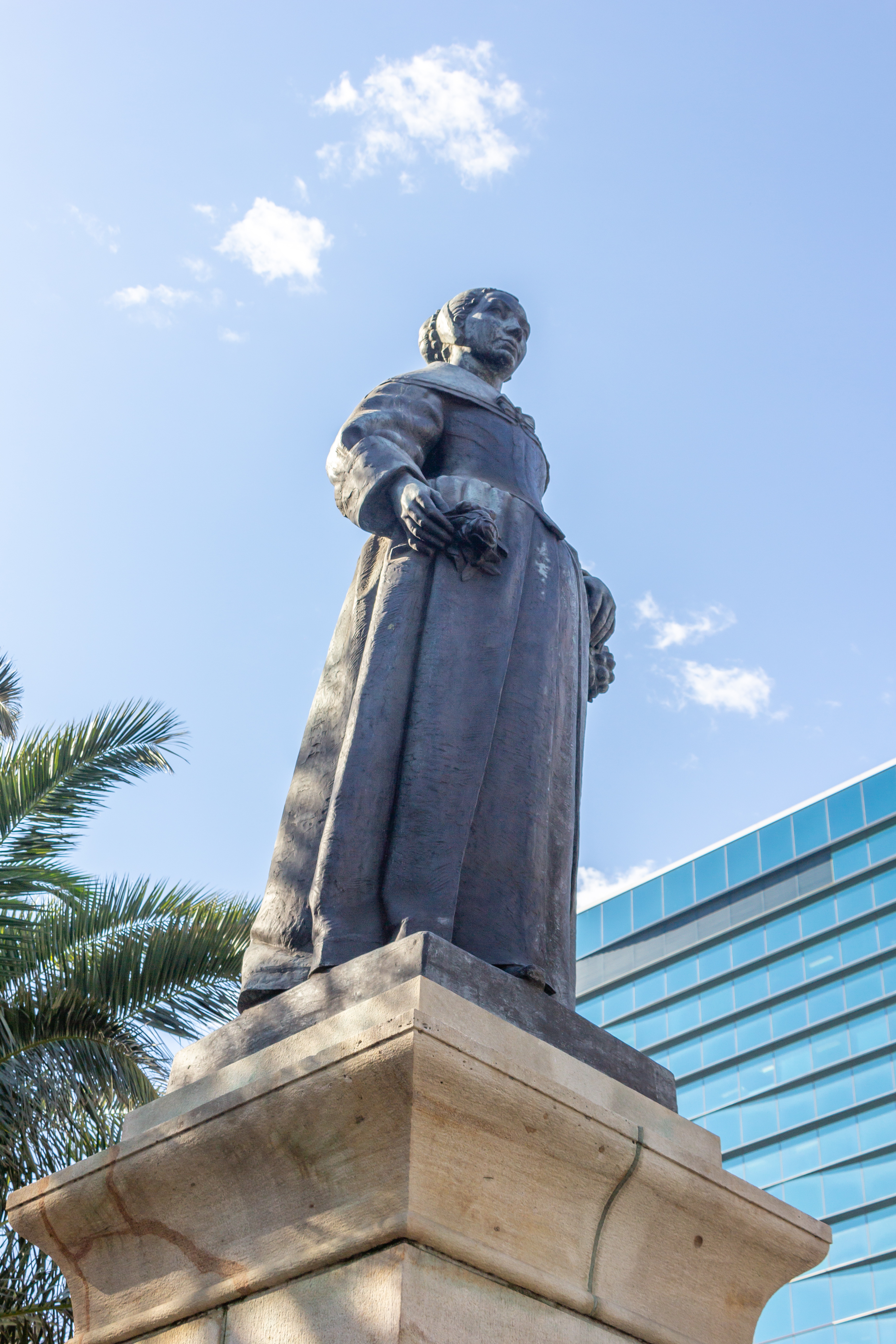
- Medium: Statue
- Subject: Maria van Riebeeck
- Location: Cape Town, South Africa
- 33°55′10.1″S 18°25′33.9″E

A statue of Maria van Riebeeck (née de la Que(i)llerie) stands alongside that of her husband, Jan van Riebeeck, in a roundabout on Heerengracht Street in Cape Town, South Africa.

It was a gift by the Netherlands to the people of South Africa to commemorate the first settlement of the Cape of Good Hope. On 2 October 1954, Prince Bernhard of Lippe-Biesterfeld, husband of Queen Juliana of the Netherlands, unveiled the statue in front of the Iziko South African National Gallery in Company's Garden. In 1969, the statue was moved to its current location.

The statue depicts Maria de la Queillerie's stately figure with a serious expression. She wears a circular collar and a wide skirt hangs from her cosseted waist. A coif keeps her hair out of her eyes. She carries a fruit basket in her left arm and a bouquet of flowers in her right hand, hinting at her interest in gardening and produce growing for the Cape refreshment station.

There is no reasonably confirmed image of Maria de la Queillerie from her lifetime. The sculptor, Dirk Wolbers, is said to have therefore used his own wife as a model, in what was to be the last sculpture of his career. It was cast in bronze in Paris.

== See also ==
- Statue of Jan van Riebeeck at the same location, first unveiled in 1899
