= Strandloper peoples =

Foraging groups on coast of southwest Africa

Strandloper //gubün
- Peoples
- Ethnicity: Damara
- Location: South-western Africa
- Descended from: Khoikhoi
- Language: Khoekhoegowab

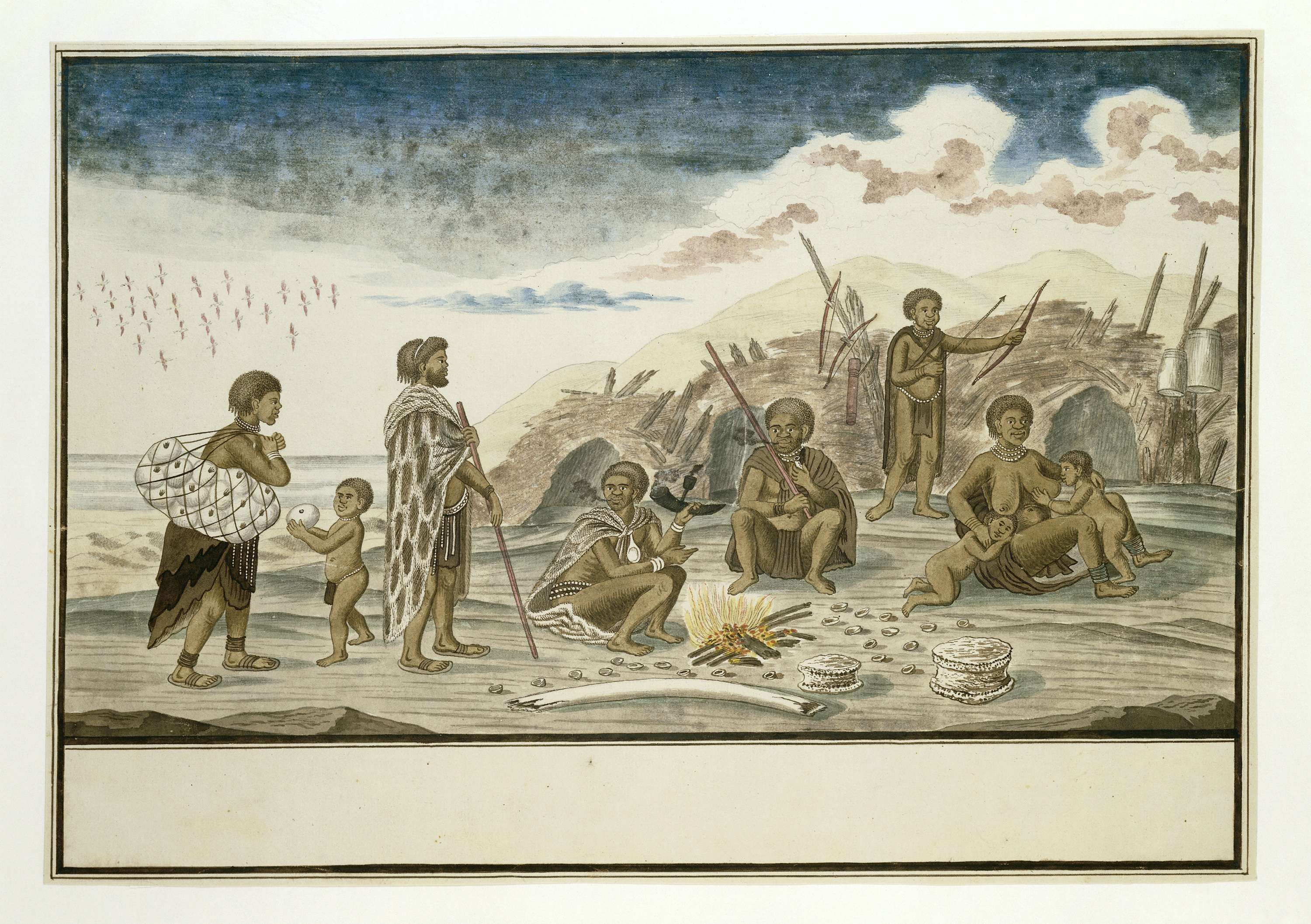
A picture of Strandloper peoples

The Strandlopers are a Khoikhoi-derived people who live by hunting and gathering food along the beaches of south-western Africa, originally from the Cape Colony to the Skeleton Coast.

Most Strandloper communities did not persist in the face of demographic and economic changes occurring in southern and south-western Africa during the 19th and 20th centuries, and disappeared through assimilation. The only tribe still distinguishable from their assimilating neighborhood are the Topnaar of the southern Namib who in 2005 consisted of around 500 members, distributed over 12 small settlements along Kuiseb River in central Namibia. Although the other communities have disappeared, archaeological evidence of their existence remains in the form of middens containing seashells, pottery and the bones of whales and seals, as well as ash and charcoal.

== Etymology ==
The name is Afrikaans and Dutch for “beach walker”. The term has been extended by archaeologists to refer to coastal communities with subsistence economies based on beachcombing and a marine diet. The term was also borrowed during South Africa's apartheid era by some white South Africans, as a gesture of rejection of the government's racial policies through self-identification with the native inhabitants of the country, and subsequently by those attracted by the beaches and beach lifestyle.

== See also ==
- Beachcombing
- Khoikhoi
- Khoisan
- Klasies River Caves
- Mussel Point
- Paternoster Midden
- San people
- Krotoa - a Goringhaicona woman
- Autshumato - Strandloper leader
