= 1654 in South Africa =

- Decades
- See also: List of years in South Africa

The following lists events that happened during 1654 in South Africa.

== Events ==
- Dutch East India Company establishes the Cape as a halfway house for ships and a penal settlement for convicts and political exiles.
- The first Cape-based slave expedition is sent to Madagascar and Moçambique, but the ship gets wrecked along the coast of Madagascar.
- Jan van Riebeeck announces that the second anniversary of his arrival at the Cape will be observed as a prayer and thanksgiving day.
- A few Malays of Batavia, brought by the Dutch into the Settlement of the Cape of Good Hope, are possibly the first Muslims to arrive in South Africa.
- The first Asiatics, arriving on the ship Haaselt, are part of a group of exiles whose descendants are now an important element of Cape Town's population.
- Four Asiatics are sentenced to banishment and hard labor for life in Batavia, after preaching insurrection against Dutch rule.
- The Redoubt Duijnhoop fortification is built at the mouth of the Salt River.
- The settlers of the Dutch Cape Colony place all of their ewes and a few rams on Robben Island.
- Dutch settlers release rabbits on the island to provide a ready source of meat for passing ships.
