= 1661 in South Africa =

- Decades
- See also: List of years in South Africa

The following lists events that happened during 1661 in South Africa.

== Incumbents ==
- Commander of the Cape - Jan van Riebeeck

== Events ==
- Pieter Cruythoff & 15 men begin an expedition towards north of the Cape.
- Pieter Cruythoff and his men reach Namaqua territory, describing them as giants in animal skins with iron & copper beadwork.
- The VOC complains that Jan van Riebeeck was establishing a colony and a town, a plan that had been discouraged by the company.
- The Duijnhoop redoubt becomes abandoned, and falls into disrepair.
- Vanrhynsdorp is first explored by Europeans through Pieter van Meerhoff.
- The first permanent British settlement on the African continent is made at James Island in the Gambia River, which becomes a key post in the Transatlantic Slave Trade.
- Jacques de Villiers, part of the future de Villiers winemaking family, is born.
