= Statues of Bartolomeu Dias =

Statue in Cape Town, South Africa

- Completion date: 12 March 1960
- Location: Cape Town
- 33°55′3.086″S 18°25′40.775″E

There are at least three statues of Bartolomeu Dias, the first European to sail around the southernmost tip of Africa. This exploration, in 1488, led to the discovery of a sea route from Europe to Asia.

== South Africa ==
A statue of Dias in Cape Town lies at the intersection of Heerengracht and Coen Steytler Boulevards. On 12 March 1960, the statue was unveiled on the front lawn of the South African National Gallery in Company's Garden. Later, the bronze artwork was moved with the statue of Maria van Riebeeck to near the entrance of the Port of Cape Town. In 1952, on the 300th anniversary of the settlement of the Cape of Good Hope, the Portuguese government decided to bestow a statue by Prof. Salvador Barata Feyo to the people of South Africa. The granite pedestal was designed by the architect António Fernandes de Sá. Another statue of the explorer stands near the Post Office Tree near the Bartolomeu Dias Museum Complex in Mossel Bay.

== United Kingdom ==
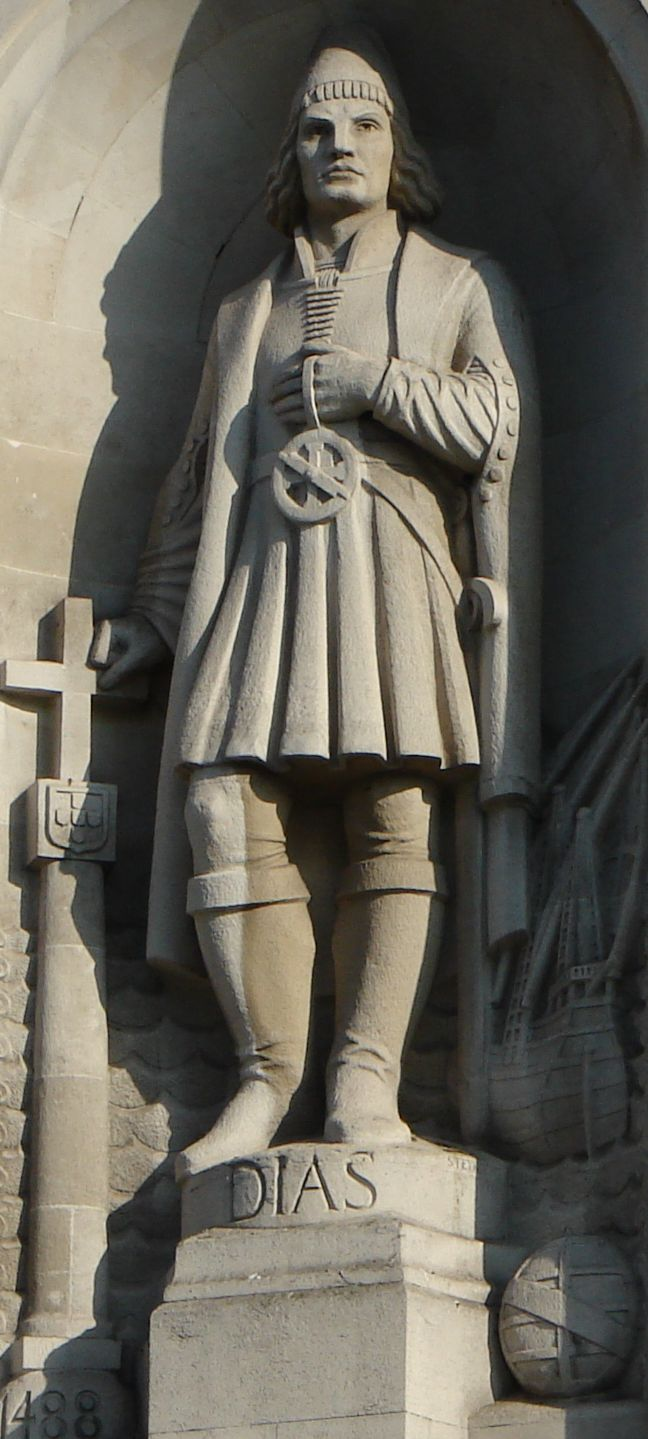

In an alcove of the South Africa House in Trafalgar Square, London, where the High Commission of South Africa is based, a statue of Dias by Coert Steynberg was built before World War II

== Design ==
Since no images were rendered of Dias during his lifetime, the features are imaginary. His posture radiates bravery, energy, and perseverance, and is meant to convey more to the spectator than his face. He wears a wide seaman's coat and peers over the bow of his ship to the stormy southeast over the open ocean. He holds his cap in his right hand and his astrolabe in his right.
