= 1660 in South Africa =

- Decades
- See also: List of years in South Africa

The following is a list of events during 1660 in South Africa.

== Incumbents ==
- Commander of the Cape of Good Hope - Jan van Riebeeck

== Events ==
- The Thembu, Mpondo, Mpondomise, and Xhosa kingdoms are established.
- Jan Danckaert's Dutch expedition reaches Olifants River, where he spots Namaqua fires but decides to turn back.
- The first Khoikhoi-Dutch War ends after months of negotiations.
- The Royal African Company is formed.
