= Bartholomew Vermuyden =

Dutch officer

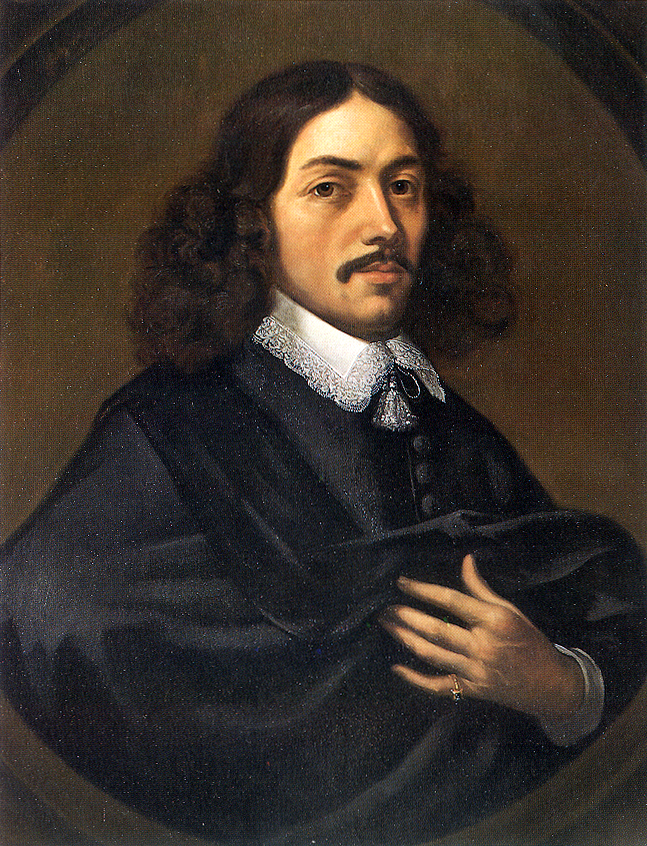
Bartholomew Vermuyden, portrait by Dirck Craey

Bartholomew Vermuyden (1616/7 - 4 August 1650, Tholen) was a Dutch officer who had a senior role in the Parliamentary army during the English Civil War.

Bartholomew was born in 1616/7 in Tholen, the son of Johan Bartelsz Vermuyden, an uncle of Cornelius Vermuyden and Maria Joans Liens, who married in London circa 1618. Maria Joans Liens was the sister of Joachim Liens, the Dutch diplomat married to Cornelia Vermuyden, already his aunt.

== English Civil War ==
He held the rank of Colonel and commanded a regiment of Horse, i.e. cavalry.

He took his brigade of 2,500 mounted troops of the New Model Army which was detached to join the Scots Covenanter Army following a polarised debate in the Committee of Both Kingdoms.

On 8 June 1645 Vermuyden met with Oliver Cromwell to explain that pressing matters overseas meant that he would have to relinquish his commission in the New Model Army. Cromwell agreed to discharge him. When the House of Commons agreed to Fairfax's request that leave should be given for Cromwell to lead the Cavalry in the New Model Army, he assumed personal command of Vermuyden's troops.

== South African Banknote ==
For a long time, the South African banknotes featured a picture of Vermuyden, mistakenly believed to be of Jan Van Riebeeck.
