= Coornhoop =

17th century farmhouse in Cape Town, South Africa

Coordinates: 33°56′36″S 18°28′32″E

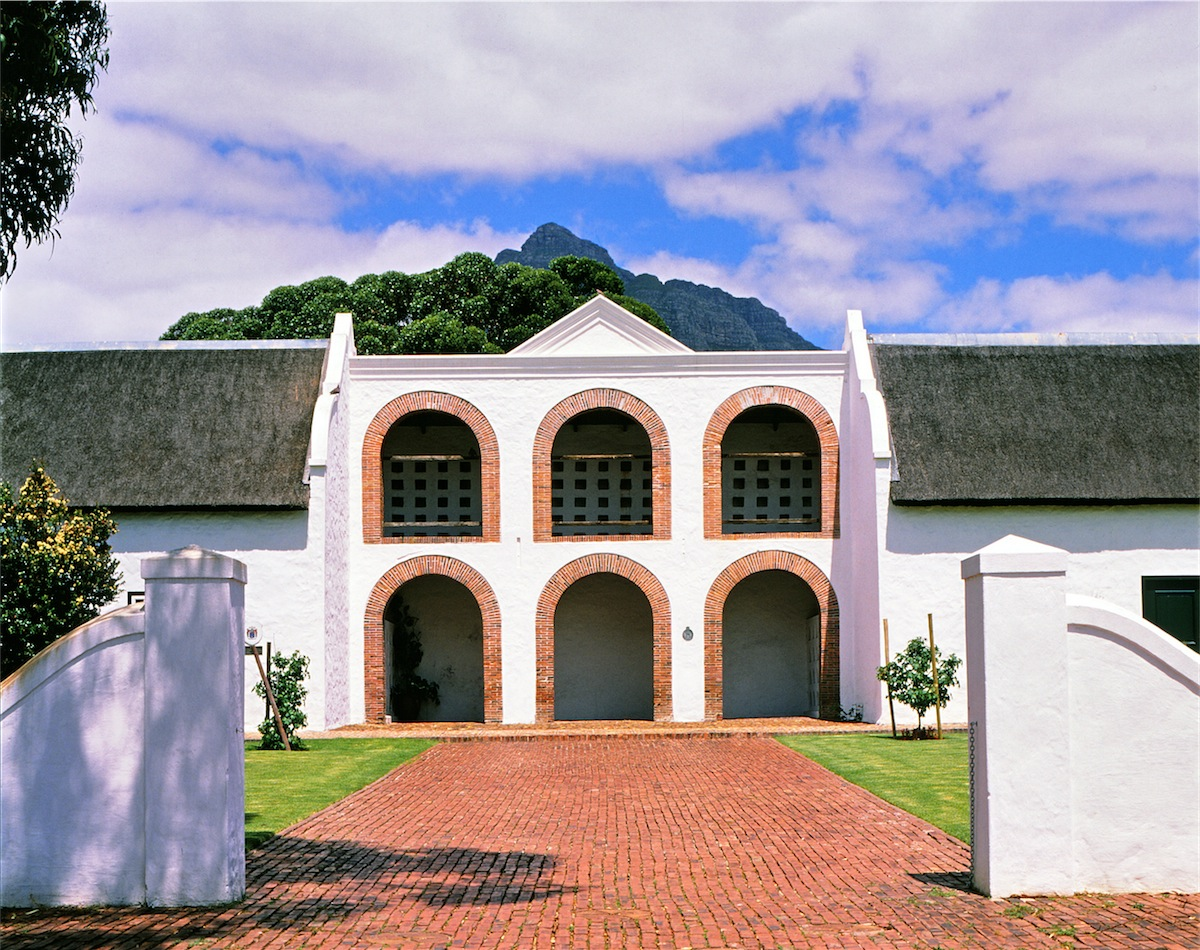
Coornhoop

Coornhoop (also Koornhoop, Corenhoop, Coorenhoop) is a historic 17th century farmhouse. It is located at 2 Dixton Road in Observatory, Cape Town. Currently, it houses the Centre for Conflict Resolution.

== History ==
In 1657 and 1658, Jan van Riebeeck gave land to 14 Vryburgers on the western bank of the Liesbeek river to farm with wheat. To protect their harvest from raids by the Khoikhoi, a row of small forts and sheds were built along the river. In the event of an attack, the women and children of the neighbouring allotments were to take shelter in them. In September 1657 the sheds at Coornhoop were completed. After 4 years, the buildings at Coornhoop fell into disuse. A series of owners then subdivided the ground and sometimes consolidated sections, and converted the sheds to residences. It has evolved into one of Cape Peninsula's most beautiful developments. In the 19th and 20th centuries the buildings deteriorated and were demolished.

In 1961, the Simon van der Stel Foundation (Note: See af:Stellenbosch Erfenis Stigting) bought the buildings and restored them in 1964. The gable ends of the remaining shells are of the concave/convex type and date from 1797.

== Dovecote ==
Behind two rows of three arches connecting two of the original sheds, stands a unique double-storey dovecote. The facade is a feature of the Cape architecture. In 1966 this dovecote was declared a monument. In the William Fehr Collection there is a sketch from 1896 by A.F. Truter of the dovecote.

== Western Province Agricultural Union ==
On May 24, 1971, the agricultural union made an information board for the building listing the names of the first 14 free burghers located at Coornhoop, De Hollantse Thuijn and Groenevelt.
