= 1664 in South Africa =

- Decades
- See also: List of years in South Africa

The following lists events that happened during 1664 in South Africa.

== Incumbents ==
- Governor of the Cape Colony - Zacharias Wagenaer

== Events ==
- The last of 5 expeditions to find Namaqua land is sent out.
- The first official Protestant wedding between a European man & Khoikhoi woman is held.
- Rumors of war between the British and the Dutch empires resurface.
- The Lords Seventeen order Zacharias Wagenaer to build a five-pointed stone castle at the Cape, later to be called the "Castle of Good Hope".
- The castle design features a central water well under the Boog, and includes five bulwarks.
- Louis XIV, with First Minister Colbert, establishes the French East India Company to compete with the British & the Dutch East India trading companies.
