= 1653 in South Africa =

- Decades
- See also: List of years in South Africa

The following lists events that happened during 1653 in South Africa.

== Events ==
- An abundant Cape fur seal harvest is had in South Africa.
