= Krotoa =

South African translator (d. 1674)

- "!Oroǀõas"
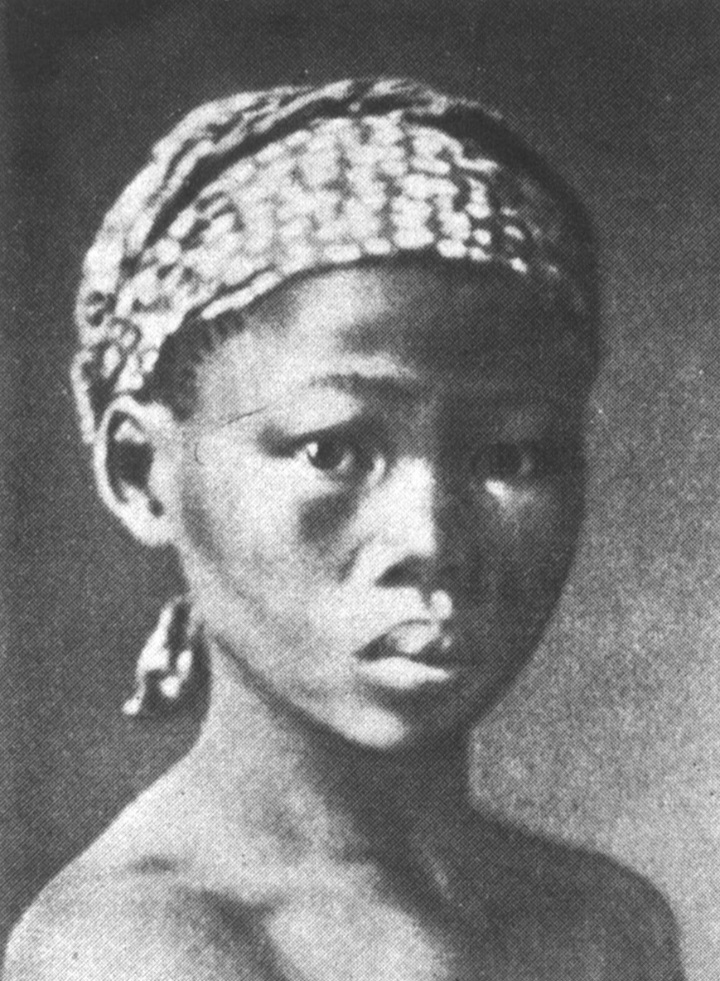
- 20th century illustration
- Born: Unknown c. 1643 ǁHuiǃgaeb
- Died: 29 July 1674 (aged 31–32)
- Other names: Eva van Meerhof
- Occupation: Interpreter
- Spouse: Pieter van Meerhof

The "!Oroǀõas" ("Ward-girl"), spelled in Dutch as Krotoa or Kroket, otherwise known by her Christian name Eva (c. 1643 – 29 July 1674), was a !Uriǁ'aeǀona translator who worked for the Vereenigde Oostindische Compagnie (VOC) during the founding of the Cape Colony.

Her name appears in the journals of the United East India Company (VOC) from as early as 1652. She was the first woman mentioned by her Khoi name in early European records of the settlement at ǁHuiǃgaeb (Cape Town).

== Name ==
The name "Krotoa" or "Kroket" was most likely not a name, but a Dutch spelling of the designation !Oroǀõas (Khoekhoegowab spelling: !Goroǀgôas), referring to the fact that she was put under guardianship, either of her uncle Autshumato (also known as Kx'aothumathub) or of Jan van Riebeeck and Maria van Riebeeck. Her actual birth name is unknown.

== Biography ==
=== Early life ===
Krotoa was born in 1643 as a member of the !Uriǁ’aeǀona (Strandlopers) people. She was the niece of Autshumao, a Khoi chieftain, who had grown wealthy as a trader. At the age of twelve, she was taken to work in the household of Jan van Riebeeck, the first governor of the Cape colony. As a teenager, she learned Dutch and Portuguese and, like her uncle, worked as an interpreter for the Dutch who wanted to trade goods for cattle. Krotoa received goods such as tobacco, brandy, bread, beads, copper, and iron for her services. In exchange, when she visited her family, her Dutch masters expected her to return with cattle, horses, seed pearls, amber, tusks, and hides. Unlike her uncle, however, Krotoa was able to obtain a higher position within the Dutch hierarchy, as she additionally served as a trading agent and ambassador for a high-ranking chief and peace negotiator in times of war. Her story exemplifies the initial dependency of the Dutch newcomers on the natives, who were able to provide reasonably reliable information about the local inhabitants.

The initial arrival of the Dutch in April 1652 was not viewed as negative. Many Khoi people saw their arrival as an opportunity for personal gain as middlemen in the livestock trade; others saw them as potential allies against preexisting enemies. At the peak of her career as an interpreter, Krotoa held the belief that Dutch presence could bring benefits for both sides.

There are multiple accounts of how Krotoa came to work in the household of Jan van Riebeeck. One account says the Dutch forcefully kidnapped the child as a !Oroǀõas, although no hard evidence confirms this account. She was taken in as a companion and as a servant to van Riebeeck's wife and children. However, many authors and historians speculate that she most likely lived in a happy space, based on the fondness van Riebeek showed for her in his journals. Circumstantial evidence supports the theory that at the time of the Dutch arrival, the girl was living with her uncle Autshumato (also known as Harry by the Dutch), the circumstantial evidence being that she showed consistent hostility to the !Uriǁ’aekua and, by association, to her mother, who lived with them. In contrast, Krotoa's fate and fortunes were closely aligned to those of her uncle Autshumato and his clan known as the !Uriǁ'aeǀona. The ǃUriǁ'aeǀona people, who were sedentary, non-pastoral hunter-gatherers, are believed to be one of the first clans to make acquaintance with the Dutch people. Before the Dutch's arrival, Autshumato served as a postal agent for passing ships of several countries.

It is believed that the birth of the first baby of chaplain/sick healer Willem Barentssen Wijlant and his wife, coupled with the rapid spreading of a virulent disease in the settlement, sparked the initial negotiations to obtain services from a local girl. As Autshumato had a long history of working for Europeans, it is believed that the VOC first turned to Autshumato for negotiations. It is quite possible that Autshumato offered up his niece for servitude to better his standing with the VOC.

=== Baptism and marriage ===
On 3 May 1662 she was baptized by a visiting minister, Petrus Sibelius, in the church inside the Fort de Goede Hoop. The witnesses were Roelof de Man and Pieter van der Stael. On 26 April 1664 she married a Danish surgeon by the name of Peter Havgard, whom the Dutch called Pieter van Meerhof. She was thereafter known as Eva van Meerhof (See Geni/MyHeritage). She was the first Khoikoi to marry according to Christian customs. There was a little party in the house of Zacharias Wagenaer.

In May 1665, they left to the Cape and went to Robben Island, where van Meerhof was appointed superintendent. The family briefly returned to the mainland in 1666 after the birth of Eva's third child, in order to baptise the baby. Van Meerhof was murdered in Madagascar on 27 February 1668 on an expedition.

After the death of her husband came the appointment of a new governor, Zacharias Wagenaer. Wagenaer held deeply racist views of the Khoisan people, and as Dutch settlement grew more secure in the region, Krotoa's skills as a translator were no longer needed.

=== Later years in exile ===
Krotoa returned to the mainland on 30 September 1668 with her three children. Suffering from alcoholism, she left the Castle in the settlement to be with her family in their kraals. In February 1669, she was imprisoned unjustly for immoral behavior at the Castle and then banished to Robben Island. This was likely the result of the strict anti-alcohol laws the VOC had passed to govern the local population after they introduced higher proof European liquors. One of van Riebeeck's nieces, Elizabeth van Opdorp, adopted Krotoa's children after she was banished. She returned to the mainland on many occasions, only to find herself once more banished to Robben Island. In May 1673, she was allowed to baptise a child on the mainland. Three of her children survived. She died on 29 July 1674 in the Cape and was buried on 30 September 1674 in the Castle in the Fort. However, roughly a hundred years later, her bones were removed to an unmarked grave.

== Legacy ==
Pieternella and Salamon, Krotoa's two youngest children from her marriage to van Meerhof, were taken to Mauritius in 1677. Pieternella, who was known as Pieternella Meerhof or Pieternella van die Kaap, later married Daniel Zaaijman, a VOC vegetable farmer from Vlissingen. They had four sons and four daughters, one of whom was named Eva, and the family moved back to the Cape in 1706. Their granddaughter, Engela Catharina Zaaijman, married Abraham Peltzer Jr, son of Abraham Peltzer Sr, a VOC soldier from Hamburg, Germany and Elizabeth van den Berg.

Krotoa's descendants would later include the Peltzers, the Steenkamps and other families.

After her death, Krotoa's story would not be deeply explored for nearly two and a half centuries. Instead, attention was mostly put on white European women who came to South Africa on missionary expeditions. It was not until after the 1920s that her story become a part of South African history.

In 2016, on the anniversary of the 350th commemoration of the Castle, descendants of Krotoa conducted a ceremony to return her spirit to the Castle in the Fort.

In 2019, the exoplanet WASP-62b was officially named Krotoa as a part of 2019 NameExoWorlds.

On 20 May 2023, Stellenbosch University renamed the RW Wilcocks building to Krotoa as part of the institution’s commitment to inclusivity.

== Cultural references ==
The 2002 novel Eilande by Dan Sleigh, translated from Afrikaans by André Brink (in Dutch: 'Stemmen uit zee'/in English: 'Islands'), describes the lives of Krotoa and her daughter Pieternella from the viewpoints of seven men who knew them.

As late as 1983, under the name of Eva, she was still known in South Africa as a caution against miscegenation.

In 1990, South African poet and author Karen Press wrote a poem entitled "Krotoa's Story" that attempted to reimagine Krotoa's life, emotions, and conflicting desires partly from her perspective. The poem was based on an earlier children's story by Press entitled Krotoa, which was created as part of an educational initiative by the South African Council for Higher Education designed to inform schoolchildren about colonization from the perspective of indigenous South Africans.

In 1995, South African performer Antoinette Pienaar created a one-woman play entitled Krotoa. The work was first performed at the Little Karoo National Arts Festival, where it was awarded the “Herrie” prize. The play is unique in its depiction and memorialization of Krotoa as a mother of the nation, a characterization which had been previously rejected by white South Africans.

In 2000 Dalene Matthee wrote a novel, "Pieternella van die Kaap", based on her thorough research of diaries and documents on Eva Krotoa and Pieternella van Meerhoff in archives and museums as well as consulting Drs. Dan Sleigh and Helena Scheffler.

In her 2005 essay "Malintzin, Pocahontas, and Krotoa: Indigenous Women and Myth Models of the Atlantic World", Professor Pamela Scully compared Krotoa to Malintzin and Pocahontas, two other women of the same time period that were born in different areas of the world (Malintzin in Mesoamerica, Pocahontas in colonial Virginia). Scully argues that all three of these women had very similar experiences in the colonialist system despite being born in different regions. She argues that Krotoa's life helps demonstrate the significance of indigenous women in the founding of the Atlantic World. Scully also argues that the lives of Krotoa, Pocahontas and Malintzin show the universality of the way that indigenous people were treated in emerging colonial systems, as well as the way their experiences have been flattened by colonial origin narratives.

In 2017 a dramatic feature film directed by Roberta Durrant about Krotoa's life, titled "Krotoa", was released in South Africa to mediocre success.

== See also ==
- History of Cape Town
- Gquma

== Sources ==
- Godée Molsbergen, Everhardus Cornelis (1968). Jan van Riebeeck en sy tyd [Jan van Riebeeck and his times] (in Afrikaans). Van Schaik.
- Trudie, Bloem (1999). Krotoa-Eva: The Woman from Robben Island. Cape Town: NB Publishers. ISBN 978-0795700880.
