= Roelof de Man =

Dutch colonial governor

Roelof de Man (1634–1663) was a Dutch colonial administrator in the Dutch Cape Colony.

He was born in Culemborg (formerly also spelled Culenborg or Kuilenburg or Kuylenburgh), Netherlands in 1634 and grew up in the same walled village and era as Dutch Explorers/Founders Jan van Riebeek (1619-1677) and Anthony van Diemen (1593-1645).

Jan van Riebeek commanded the initial Dutch settlement fleet of 3 ships (Dromedaris, Reijger and Goede Hoop) which in 1651 travelled to the great southern oceans, landing on 6 April 1652 to establish the settlement of today's Cape Town, Cape of Good Hope.

Roelof de Man joined Van Riebeek at Cape Town on 5 January 1654 as the colony bookkeeper, sailing from Vlie, Netherlands on 23 August 1653 on the ship Naerden together with 4 other ships (Vreede, Lam, Draeck and Calff) - the latter two arriving sometime after the first three.

Roelof's ancestors and family held prominent positions in the Culemberg community such as Alderman(Cornelis de Man in 1492 and 1507), Mayor (Aert de Man 1539-41 and Roelof de Man 1599), Churchmaster (Roelof de Man 1542-43 and Willem de Man 1561-62) and Postmaster (Otto de Man 1580-81).

== South Africa ==
Roelof went on to become Second-In-Charge of the new colony. He was one of the witnesses at the baptism of Krotoa (Eva van die Kaap) on 3 May 1662. Former 20th Century South African President F.W. de Klerk is a claimed descendant of Krotoa.

Roelof died on 6 March 1663 and at that time had as part of his possessions 3 Angolan slaves whom he had acquired from Jan van Riebeek in 1662

The Central South African Railways recognised Roelof's contribution to the settlement of South Africa by naming one of the South African Class B 0-6-4T steam locomotives in his honour. Between 1893 and 1898 one hundred and seventy-five 46 Tonner 0-6-4T tank steam locomotives were placed in service by the Netherlands-South African Railway Company (Nederlandsche-Zuid-Afrikaansche Spoorwegmaatschappij - NZASM) in the Zuid-Afrikaansche Republiek. The "Roelof de Man" was built in 1898 and carried Works Number 2950 with NZASM number 235. Picture shows Works Number 2945 NZASM number 230 "Jan Wintervogel" that was part of the same build order.

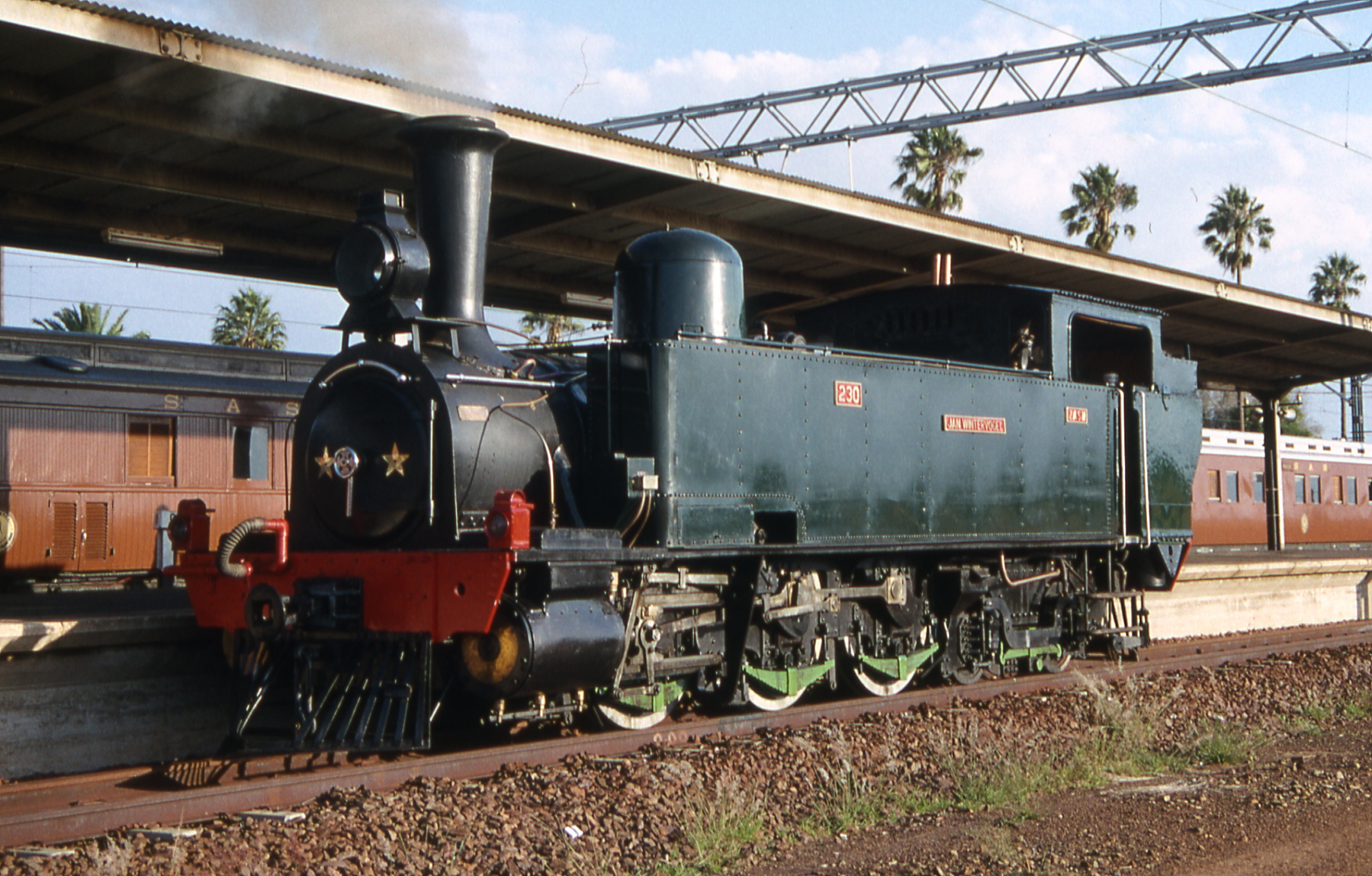
NZASM 46 Tonner 230 (0-6-4T) F
