= Doman (Khoikhoi) =

Indigenous rebel in the Cape of Good Hope

- Nommoa
- Died: 12 December 1663; Dutch Cape Colony
- Occupations: Interpreter and leader of the Khoikhoi in the First Khoikhoi-Dutch War

Doman (died 12 December 1663) was a Khoikhoi tribesman and interpreter with the Dutch settlers at the Cape of Good Hope. He was one of the first interpreters employed by the Dutch East India Company at their settlement on the Cape. After being taken to Java in 1657, he witnessed the company's subjugation of the native people there and turned against the Dutch. Shortly after his return to Africa, he led his people in the First Khoikhoi-Dutch War of 1659–1660. They were unable to storm the company's fort, and Doman was wounded, after which the war ended and Doman returned to Dutch employment.

== Biography ==
Doman's Khoikhoi name was Nommoa but he is more commonly known by the name the Dutch gave him. Doman's Dutch name may be derived from the Afrikaans "dominee" meaning 'parson', but it might also be derived from the Khoikhoi (!Kora) word "domma" meaning 'voice' in the Khoekhoegowab language. He was one of two interpreters employed by the Dutch at the suggestion of their first interpreter, a Khoikhoi chief Autshumato, to act for the Dutch whilst Autshumato was absent from the settlement (the other was Khaik Ana Ma Koukoa, known as Krotoa or Claes Das to the Dutch). Jan van Riebeeck's diarist noted that Doman "seems to be well-disposed towards us" and "is serving the Hon. Company better than anybody else - up to the present at any rate". Rijckloff van Goens, advising van Riebeeck on defence matters, took Doman to Java in the Dutch East Indies in April 1657 where he witnessed how the local people had been forced to submit to Dutch rule. The trip was intended to teach Doman the commercial business of the company but is thought to have caused Doman to understand the threat the Dutch posed to the Khoikhoi way of life and caused him to turn against them. During the trip he witnessed the resistance attempted by the Bantamese against the Dutch in north Java.

In order to hasten his return to Africa Doman told the Dutch he intended to convert to Christianity and no longer wanted to live among his people. When he returned, Doman clashed frequently with Krotoa, who he claimed had tried to curry favour with the Dutch and betray her people. Doman was the only voice to speak out when van Riebeeck took several Khoikhoi leaders hostage in 1658.

When Autshumato was banished, Krotoa assumed responsibility for the Dutch trade with the local people. When he tried to intervene with a cattle negotiation with the Cochoqua people in May 1659, Doman was publicly beaten. Later that year Doman was blamed by van Riebeeck for the theft of company cattle and the murder of a Dutchman and theft of his firearm.

Doman sided with his people in the First Khoikhoi-Dutch War of 1659–1660, urging them to eject the Dutch from the Cape. He offered advice on how to exploit Dutch military weaknesses and led attacks on rainy days when the Dutch gunpowder would be affected. The Dutch authorities described Doman as "too knowing" after his return from Java, where he had witnessed the Bantamese rebellion and "learned to handle fire-arms". Given the importance of his trip to Java in shaping Doman's political consciousness, Dutch administrators at the Cape described him as the "Batavian Hottentoo". Doman and his guerillas stole many sheep and cattle and burnt crops and homesteads. Though they overran most of the outlying settlements and farms they lacked the means to storm the Dutch fort at the Cape.

Doman was wounded by a musketball on 19 July 1659, being paralysed in one arm. This was one of the reasons for the ending of the war. He was allowed to return to the Dutch following peace negotiations in April and May 1660 and resumed his work for them as an interpreter. He died on 12 December 1663, the Dutch governor Zacharias Wagenaer recorded that "none of us will have cause to grieve, as he has been, in many respects, a mischievous and malicious man towards the company".

== Legacy ==
In 2019 the South African National Defence Force's reserve unit 30 Field Workshop was renamed the Doman Field Workshop in his honour.
