= Maria van Riebeeck =

French Huguenot settler in Dutch Cape Colony (1629–1664)

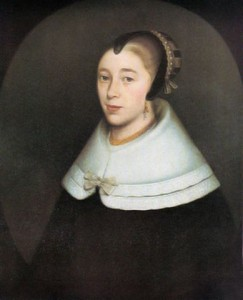
- Born: Maria de la Queillerie; 28 October 1629; Rotterdam, Dutch Republic
- Died: 2 November 1664 (aged 35); Dutch Malacca
- Spouse: Jan van Riebeeck
- Children: Abraham van Riebeeck; 7 others

Maria van Riebeeck (née de la Queillerie; 28 October 1629 – 2 November 1664) was a French Huguenot who was the first wife of Jan van Riebeeck, the Dutch colonial administrator and first commander of the settlement at the Cape.

== Life ==
She was the daughter of Abraham de la Queillerie (1589–1630) from Tournai, Belgium and Maria du Bois (born 1594 died unknown) from France. Her grandfather Chrétien de la Queillerie (1543-), a nobleman from the Boulogne-sur-Mer region, had also been a pastor in Armentières, then a military chaplain in the army of Guillaume d'Orange, then a pastor in the Pays- Bas, notably in Ghent, Leiden, Utrecht and Bergen-op-Zoom. They spoke French and Dutch in her family. She spent her childhood in Leiden.

She married Van Riebeeck on 28 March 1649 in Schiedam. The couple had eight children, of whom most died young. The couple arrived to the later Cape Town in South Africa in 1652.

The first period, they lived in a tent. Maria acted as the hostess to guests, is said to have entertained with a clavichord, and was described as diplomatically gifted in the company of foreigners. She was from 1658 active as a money lender to the colonists, and used a slave girl as an interpreter to communicate with the native population.

Little is known about the personality of Maria de la Queillerie, but in 1660–1661, the French priest Nicolas Étienne stayed ten months in Cape Town after a shipwreck; in a letter, he describes her as very pious (in Protestant faith of course), diplomatic and very intelligent.

She died in Dutch Malacca on 2 November 1664, aged 35, from smallpox.

== Legacy ==
She has been referred to as the ancestral mother of the white Afrikaners. The South African Navy submarine, the SAS Maria van Riebeeck, was named in her memory.

A commemorative plaque of Maria van Riebeeck can be found in the ruins of Saint Paul's Church in Malacca, replacing the original tombstone that was transported to Cape Town in 1915.

A statue of Maria van Riebeeck is located in a Cape Town square between Heerengracht Street and Adderley Street, next to that of her husband. It was offered in 1952 by the Dutch State for the commemorations of the 300th anniversary of the arrival of Jan van Riebeeck at the Cape of Good Hope in 1652. Having no certainty as to the appearance of Maria, the sculptor Dirk Wolbers used his own wife as a model. The statue was unveiled by Prince Bernhard of the Netherlands on October 2, 1954. Queen Juliana was not present having told Prime Minister DF Malan that she would not travel to South Africa while apartheid, implemented from 1948, is said to be in force there. The statue was then placed in the garden of the National Art Museum in Cape Town.
