= Autshumato =

Khoi chieftain and colonial interpreter (d. 1663)

Autshumato Harry de Strandloper
- Autshumato
- Born: Unknown c. 1625
- Died: 1663
- Other names: Harry de Strandloper, Herry de Strandloper, Autshumao
- Occupation: Interpreter
- Years active: 1630-1663
- Known for: Interpreter for the Dutch Settlers of Cape Town

Autshumato (or Autshumao; Herry or Harry de Strandloper) was a chief of the Khoikhoi Gorinhaikonas (or Goringhaicona) who worked as an interpreter for the Europeans in present-day Cape Town, South Africa, both prior to and during the establishment of the Dutch settlement on the Cape of Good Hope in 1652.

His date of birth is unknown, but it is thought that he lived between about 1625 and 1663. In 1630, he was taken to Bantam; there he was taught English and Dutch in order to facilitate trade between settlers and his people. As chief and interpreter, he accrued considerable wealth. In 1632, he moved to Robben Island, working as postman and liaison for European ships passing the island. Moving back to the mainland eight years later, Autshumato worked to create trade between the Gorinhaikonas and the Dutch.

On 6 April 1652, Jan van Riebeeck, a Dutchman employed by the Verenigde Oostindische Compagnie (V.O.C.), arrived at the Cape to take control of the burgeoning settlement that eventually became Cape Town.

In the year 1658, Jan van Riebeeck imprisoned Autshumato on Robben Island. Despite his escape with another prisoner, the Dutch settlers allowed him to resume his work as an interpreter for the rest of his lifetime.

He died in 1663.

== Family ==
Fellow interpreter and colonial liaison Krotoa, otherwise known as Eva van Meerhoff, was Autshumato's niece.

== Legacy ==
The South African Department of Arts and Culture and the Centre for Text Technology (CTexT®), at the North-West University (NWU) initiated a project named after Autshumato in 2007. The aims of the Autshumato project is to research, develop and support open-source translation software in order to promote multilingualism and access to information in South Africa. The project is still active and the following outputs have been developed and released:

- An Integrated Translation Environment (ITE); which is a derived work of the popular open-source OmegaT CAT tool.
- A Terminology Management System (TMS),
- Several machine translation (MT) systems for automatic translation in the government domain; developed language pairs include: English (EN-GB) into Afrikaans (AF-ZA), IsiZulu (ZU-ZA), Sepedi (NSO-ZA), Xitsonga (TS-ZA) and Setswana (TN-ZA).
- Machine translation web service; through this service anyone can gain access to the MT systems developed as part of the Autshumato project.

The systems and software of the Autshumato project is released on SourceForge.net.

In addition to this, the Autshumato Anti-Aircraft Regiment, a division of the South African Army, also shares the chief's name.

== See also ==
- History of Cape Town
