= Jan van Riebeeck =

Dutch colonial administrator (1619–1677)

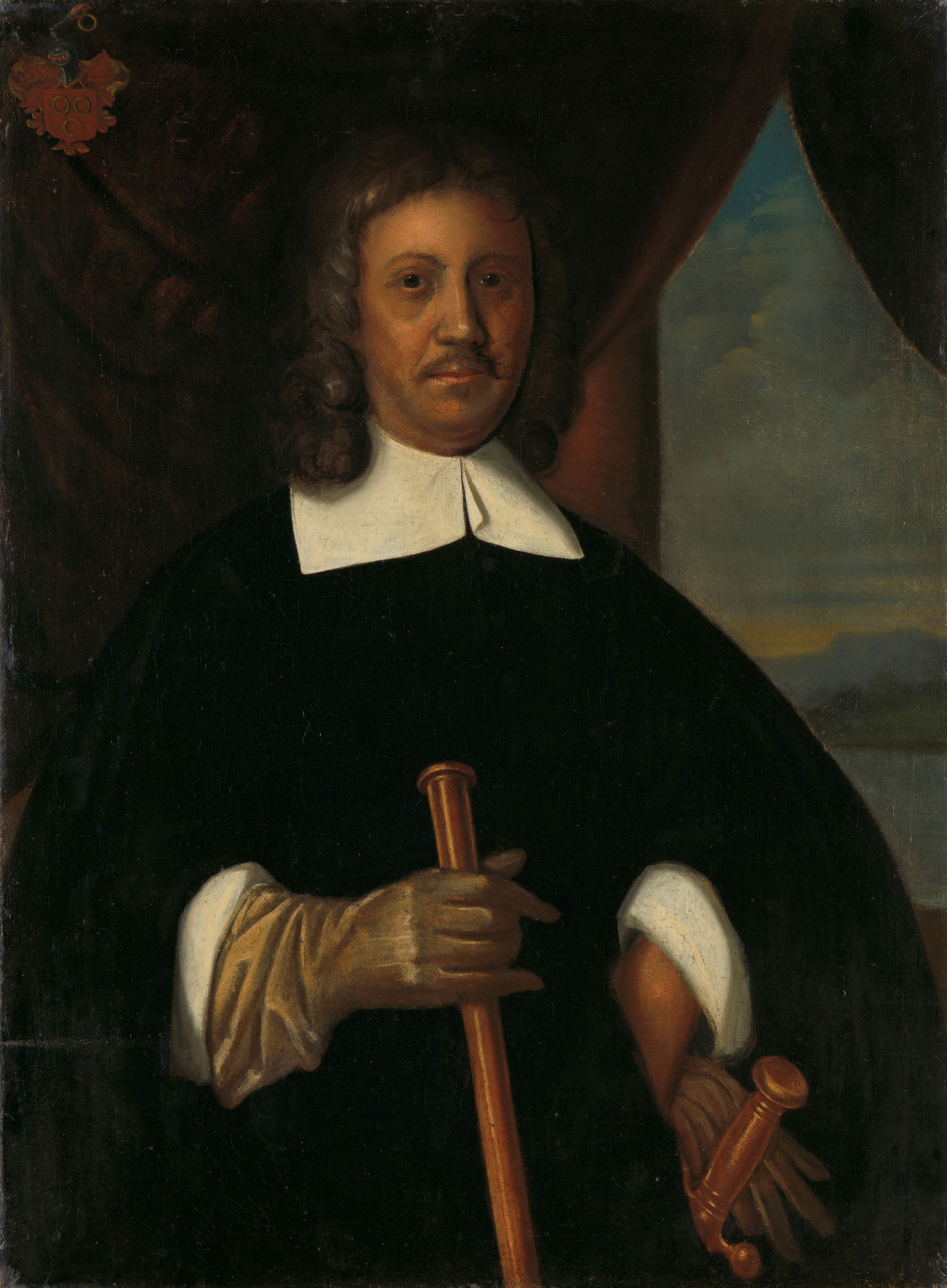
- c. 1660 portrait of Van Riebeeck

Commander of the Cape
- In office 7 April 1652 – 6 May 1662
- Succeeded by: Zacharias Wagenaer

Personal details
- Born: Jan Anthoniszoon van Riebeeck; 21 April 1619 Culemborg, County of Culemborg, Holy Roman Empire
- Died: 18 January 1677 (aged 57) Batavia, Dutch East Indies
- Resting place: Groote Kerk, Jakarta
- Spouses: Maria de la Queillerie (m. 1649; died 1664): Maria Isaacks Scipio
- Children: 7, including Abraham
- Occupation: Colonial administrator

Johan Anthoniszoon van Riebeeck (Note: Dutch pronunciation: [ˈjɑɱ vɑn ˈribeːk], Afrikaans pronunciation: [ˈjan fan ˈribiək].) (21 April 1619 – 18 January 1677) was a Dutch merchant and colonial administrator who served as the first Commander of the Cape from 1652 to 1662.

== Life ==
=== Early life ===
Jan van Riebeeck was born in Culemborg on 21 April 1619, the son of a surgeon. He grew up in Schiedam, where he married a 19-year-old Maria de la Queillerie on 28 March 1649. She died in Malacca, now part of Malaysia, on 2 November 1664, at the age of 35. The couple had eight or nine children, most of whom did not survive infancy. Their son Abraham van Riebeeck, born at the Cape, later became Governor-General of the Dutch East Indies.

=== Employment in the VOC ===
Joining the Vereenigde Oost-Indische Compagnie (VOC) (Dutch East India Company) in 1639, he served in several posts, including that of an assistant surgeon in the Batavia in the East Indies.

He was head of the VOC trading post in Tonkin, Indochina. After being dismissed from that position in 1645 due to conducting trade for his own personal account, he began to advocate for a refreshment station in the Cape of Good Hope after staying 18 days there during his return voyage. Two years later, support increased after a marooned VOC ship was able to survive in a temporary fortress. The Heeren XVII requested a report from Leendert Jansz and Mathys Proot, which recommended a Dutch presence.

In 1643, Van Riebeeck travelled with Jan van Elseracq to the VOC outpost at Dejima in Japan. Seven years later, in 1650, he proposed selling hides of South African wild animals to Japan.

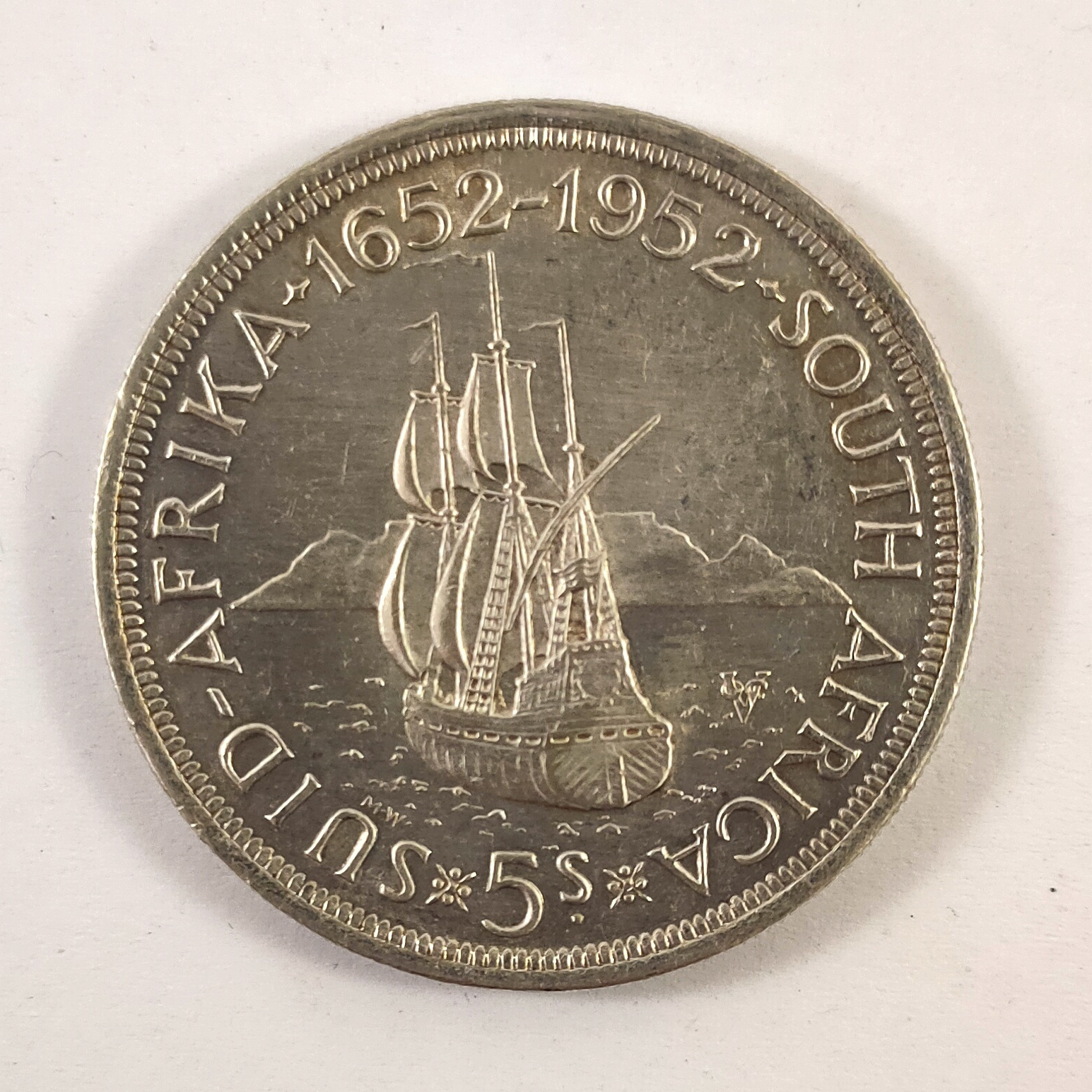
1952 5 shillings coin commemorating the 300th anniversary of the founding of Cape Town, and depicting Van Riebeeck's ship, the Drommedaris

Van Riebeeck was requested by the Dutch East India Company to take command of the initial Dutch settlement in what would become South Africa and departed from Texel on 24 December 1651. He landed two ships (The Drommedaris and Goede Hoope) in Table Bay, at the future Cape Town site on 6 April 1652, and a third ship, the Reijger, on 7 April 1652. He was accompanied by 82 men and 8 women, including his wife Maria. The fleet originally included five ships, but the Walvis and the Oliphant arrived late, having had 130 burials at sea.

Van Riebeeck immediately commenced fortifying a settlement as a way station for the VOC trade route between the Netherlands and the East Indies. The primary purpose of this way station was to provide fresh provisions for the VOC fleets sailing between the Dutch Republic and Batavia, as deaths en route were very high.

=== Commander of the Cape Colony ===
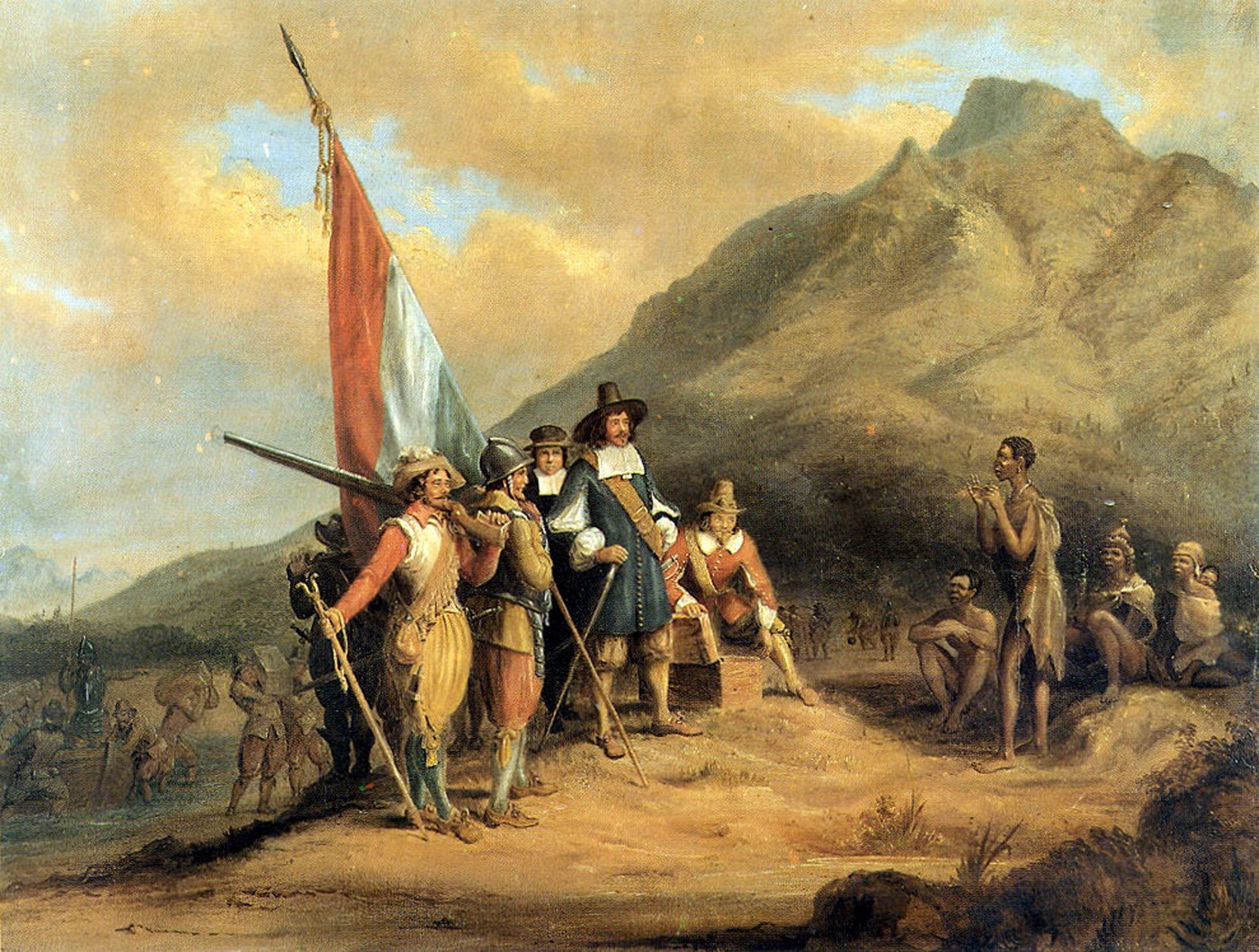
Jan van Riebeeck arrives in Table Bay in April 1652, painted by Charles Davidson Bell

Van Riebeeck was Commander of the Cape from 1652 to 1662; he was charged with building a fort, with improving the natural anchorage at Table Bay, planting cereals, fruit, and vegetables, and obtaining livestock from the indigenous Khoi people. In the Kirstenbosch National Botanical Garden in Cape Town, a few wild almond trees still survive. The initial fort, named Fort de Goede Hoop ('Fort of Good Hope'), was made of mud, clay, and timber, and had four corners or bastions. This fort was replaced by the Castle of Good Hope, built between 1666 and 1679 after Van Riebeeck had left the Cape.

Van Riebeeck was joined at the Cape by a fellow Culemborger Roelof de Man (1634–1663), who arrived in January 1654 on board the ship Naerden. Roelof came as the colony bookkeeper and was later promoted to second-in-charge.

Van Riebeeck reported the first comet discovered from South Africa, C/1652 Y1, which was spotted on 17 December 1652.

In his time at the Cape, Van Riebeeck oversaw a sustained, systematic effort to establish an impressive range of useful plants in the novel conditions on the Cape Peninsula – in the process changing the natural environment forever. Some of these, including grapes, cereals, ground nuts, potatoes, apples, and citrus, had an important and lasting influence on the societies and economies of the region. In 1659, he established a vineyard in the Colony to produce red wine to combat scurvy. Van Riebeeck owned the farm, Boschheuwel, which he advised the Company to buy on his departure in 1662 to grow fruit and vegetables while Rondebosch could be used as a nursery for young plants. The daily diary entries kept throughout his time at the Cape (VOC policy) provided the basis for future exploration of the natural environment and its natural resources. Careful reading of his diaries indicates that some of his knowledge was learned from the indigenous peoples inhabiting the region.

He died in Batavia (now renamed to Jakarta) on Java on 18 January 1677.

== Legacy in South Africa ==
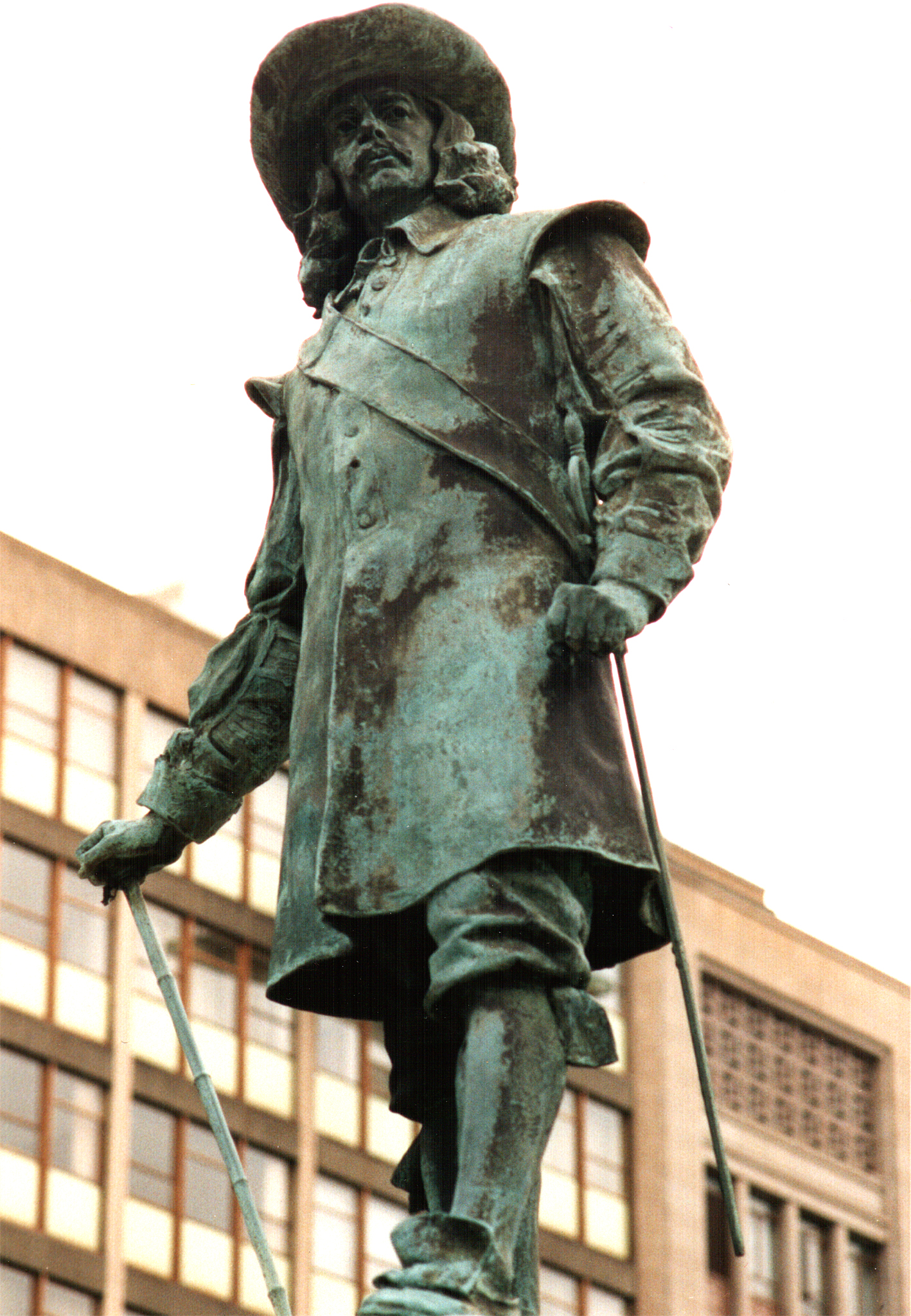
Statue of Jan van Riebeeck on Adderley Street in Cape Town. Sculpted by John Tweed, it was donated to the city by Cecil Rhodes in 1899.

Jan van Riebeeck is of immense cultural and historical significance to South Africa, as he was in particular during the Apartheid era. Many Afrikaners view him as the founding father of their nation. Consequently, his image appeared ubiquitously on postage stamps and banknotes issued until 1994. An image used on currency notes after South Africa became a republic in 1961 was thought to be that of Van Riebeeck, but was instead of Bartholomew Vermuyden.

Van Riebeeck's Day, also known as Founders' Day, was once celebrated on 6 April, but the holiday was cancelled by the African National Congress after the 1994 election. However, it is still celebrated in the Orania community in South Africa (an Afrikaner-only enclave). His image no longer appears on any official currency or stamps, but statues of him and his wife remain in Adderley Street, Cape Town. The coat of arms of the city of Cape Town is based on the Van Riebeeck family coat of arms.

Many South African towns and villages have streets named after him. Riebeek-Kasteel is one of the oldest towns in South Africa, situated 75 km from Cape Town in the Riebeek Valley together with its sister town Riebeek West.

Hoërskool Jan van Riebeeck is an Afrikaans high school in Cape Town.

Jan van Riebeeck's coat of arms, the basis of the coat of arms of Cape Town

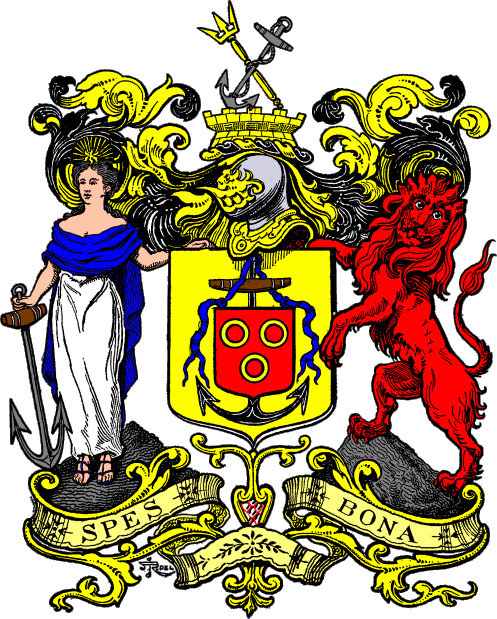
Coat of arms of Cape Town, with the arms of Jan van Riebeeck depicted in the shield

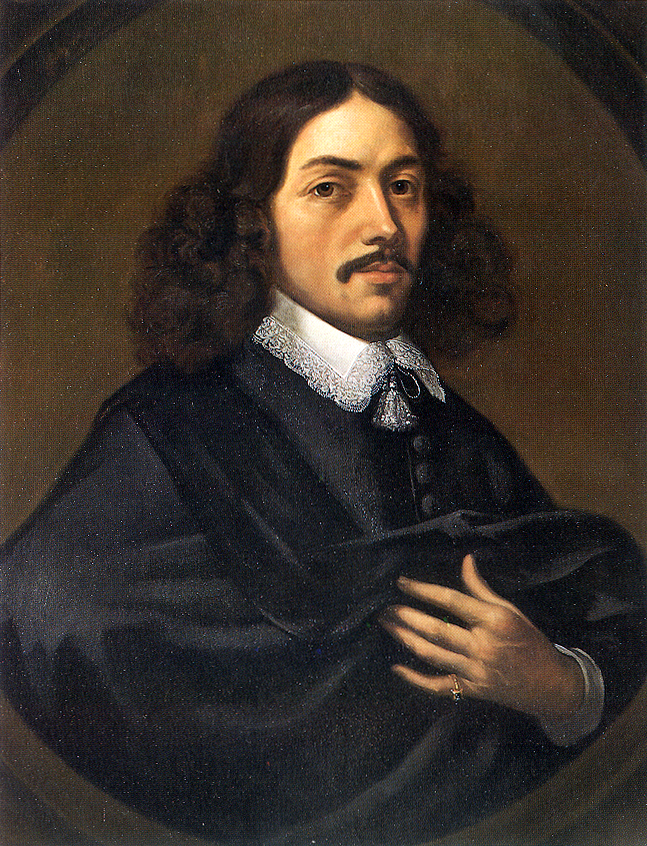
The painting of Bartholomew Vermuyden, thought to be of Van Riebeeck instead, which was used on banknotes and coins

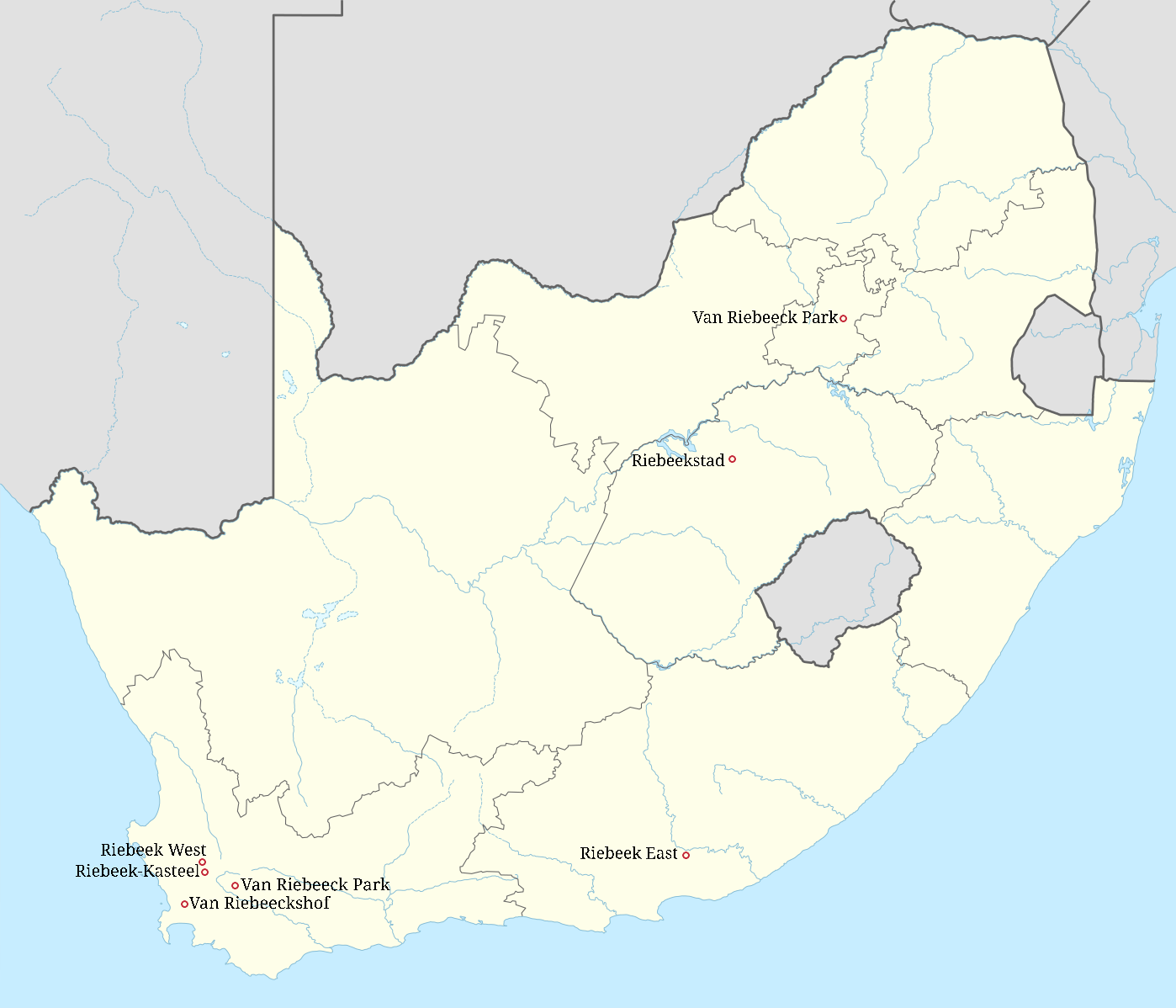
Towns and suburbs in South Africa named after Van Riebeeck. These include: Riebeek-Kasteel, Riebeek West, Riebeek East, Riebeeckstad and Van Riebeeck Park.

== See also ==
- Hoërskool Jan van Riebeeck
- Dutch East India Company
- Cape of Good Hope
- Dutch Cape Colony

== Sources ==
- Kirby, Robert. The secret letters of Jan van Riebeeck. London: Penguin Books 1992; ISBN 978-0-14-017765-7.
- Collins, Robert O. Central and South African history. Topics in world history. New York: M. Wiener Pub. 1990; ISBN 978-1-55876-017-2.
- Hunt, John, and Heather-Ann Campbell. Dutch South Africa: early settlers at the Cape, 1652–1708. Leicester, UK: Matador 2005; ISBN 978-1-904744-95-5.
