= List of heritage sites in Cape Town CBD and the Waterfront =

This is a list of the heritage sites in Cape Town's CBD, the Waterfront, and the Bo-Kaap as recognized by the South African Heritage Resources Agency.

For additional provincial heritage sites declared by Heritage Western Cape, the provincial heritage resources authority of the Western Cape Province of South Africa, please see the entries at the end of the list. These sites have been declared subsequent to the implementation of the new legislation on 1 April 2000 and unlike those in the SAHRA portion of the list are not former national monuments declared by the former National Monuments Council, the predecessor of both SAHRA and Heritage Western Cape. In the instance of these sites the "identifier" code used is that of Heritage Western Cape rather than SAHRA.

SAHRA identifier	Site name	Description	Town	District	NHRA status	Coordinates	Image
9/2/018/0003	SAHRA, 111 Harrington Street, Cape Town	The building formerly known as Granite Lodge and the extension (for the two structures to form the St. George's Orphanage for Girls), now used as the Head Office of the SAHRA. Granite Lodge, a predominantly Georgian granite-fronted house was built c. 1834 for Anthony Oliphant, the first Attorney-General of the Cape Colony. Otto Landsberg, the famous artist and tobacconist, lived here from 1845 to 1865. Current use: Offices.	Cape Town, Central	The Cape	Provincial Heritage Site	33°55′47″S 18°25′22″E	The building formerly known as Granite Lodge and the extension (for the two structures to form the St. George's Orphanage for Girls), now used as the Head Office of the SAHRA. Granite Lodge, a predominantly Georgian granite-fronted house was built c. 1834 for Anthony Oliphant, the first Attorney-General of the Cape Colony. Otto Landsberg, the famous artist and tobacconist, lived here from 1845 to 1865. Current use: Offices.
9/2/018/0003-001	Granite Lodge, 109 Harrington Street, Cape Town	Type of site: House. Current use: Offices.	Cape Town, Central	The Cape	Provincial Heritage Site	33°55′47″S 18°25′22″E	Type of site: House. Current use: Offices.
9/2/018/0003-002	Old St George's Orphanage, Roeland Street, Cape Town	Type of site: House Current use: Offices.	Cape Town, Central	The Cape	Provincial Heritage Site	33°55′47″S 18°25′22″E	Upload Photo
9/2/018/0004/001	Robben Island Embarkation Building, Victoria and Alfred Waterfront, Cape Town		Cape Town, Victoria and Alfred Waterfront	The Cape	Provincial Heritage Site	33°54′15″S 18°25′16″E	Media related to Robben Island Embarkation Building at Wikimedia Commons
9/2/018/0007	Tyne Building, 140, 142 and 148 Long Street, Cape Town	Current use: Commercial.	Cape Town, Central	The Cape	Provincial Heritage Site	33°55′27″S 18°25′01″E	Current use: Commercial.
9/2/018/0007-001	140 Long Street, Cape Town	Current use: Commercial.	Cape Town, Central	The Cape	Provincial Heritage Site	33°55′27″S 18°25′02″E	Current use: Commercial.
9/2/018/0007-002	142 Long Street, Cape Town	Current use: Commercial.	Cape Town, Central	The Cape	Provincial Heritage Site	33°55′27″S 18°25′01″E	Current use: Commercial.
9/2/018/0007-003	148 Long Street, Cape Town	Current use: Commercial.	Cape Town, Central	The Cape	Provincial Heritage Site	33°55′27″S 18°25′01″E	Current use: Commercial.
9/2/018/0009	C H Pearne Building, 25 Adderley Street, Cape Town	Architectural style: EDWARDIAN INFL. Type of site: Commercial.	Cape Town, Central	The Cape	Provisional Protection	33°55′27″S 18°25′16″E	Architectural style: EDWARDIAN INFL. Type of site: Commercial. Media related to The Adderley at Wikimedia Commons
9/2/018/0011	22 Kloof Street, Gardens, Cape Town					33°55′40″S 18°24′44″E	Upload Photo
9/2/018/0013	Two reservoirs in Belvedere Avenue and Camp Street, Gardens, Cape Town	Type of site: Reservoir.	Cape Town, Gardens	The Cape	Provincial Heritage Site	33°56′18″S 18°24′44″E	Type of site: Reservoir. Media related to Belvidere Avenue and Camp Street reservoirs at Wikimedia Commons
9/2/018/0014	Molteno Power Station, Molteno Road, Oranjezicht, Cape Town	Type of site: Power Station.	Cape Town, Oranjezicht	The Cape	Provincial Heritage Site	33°56′19″S 18°24′37″E	Type of site: Power Station. Media related to Molteno Power Station at Wikimedia Commons
9/2/018/0015	59 Shortmarket Street, Cape Town					33°55′17″S 18°25′07″E	Upload Photo
9/2/018/0016	61 Shortmarket Street, Cape Town					33°55′17″S 18°25′07″E	Upload Photo
9/2/018/0017	63 Shortmarket Street, Cape Town					33°55′17″S 18°25′07″E	Upload Photo
9/2/018/0018	65 Shortmarket Street, Cape Town					33°55′17″S 18°25′07″E	Upload Photo
9/2/018/0019	76 Strand Street, Cape Town	Architectural style: Cape Dutch elements. Current use: Commercial.	Cape Town, Central	The Cape	Provincial Heritage Site	33°55′11″S 18°25′14″E	Upload Photo
9/2/018/0020	78 Strand Street, Cape Town	Architectural style: Victorian elements. Current use: Commercial.	Cape Town, Central	The Cape	Provincial Heritage Site	33°55′11″S 18°25′13″E	Upload Photo
9/2/018/0021	Leinster Hall, 7 Weltevreden Street, Gardens, Cape Town	Leinster Hall was built in the 1850s by Sebastiaan Hofmeyr on a plot which previously formed part of the farm Weltevreden. The original part of the outbuildings was erected simultaneously. Type of site: House. Current use: Restaurant.	Cape Town, Gardens	The Cape	Provincial Heritage Site	33°55′59″S 18°24′41″E	Upload Photo
9/2/018/0023	115 Hope Street, Erf 95743, Cape Town					33°55′59″S 18°25′04″E	Upload Photo
9/2/018/0025	Old SA Leather Agency, 38 Buitenkant Street, Cape Town					33°55′42″S 18°25′21″E	Upload Photo
9/2/018/0026	St George's Grammar School, Queen Victoria Street, Cape Town	Architectural style: Cape Revival elements. Type of site: School – the building housed St. George's Grammar School before it moved to Mowbray.	Cape Town, Central	The Cape	Provincial Heritage Site	33°56′47″S 18°28′48″E	Architectural style: Cape Revival elements. Type of site: School – the building housed St. George's Grammar School before it moved to Mowbray. Media related to Old St. George's Grammar School, Cape Town at Wikimedia Commons
9/2/018/0027	Winchester House, 72-74 Long Street, Cape Town					33°55′19″S 18°25′10″E	Upload Photo
9/2/018/0029	81-83 Bree Street, Cape Town					33°55′14″S 18°25′09″E	
9/2/018/0030	Hatfield Street Terrace, 129-141 Hatfield Street, Lower Gardens, Cape					33°55′55″S 18°24′55″E	Upload Photo
9/2/018/0030/001	139 Hatfield Street, Lower Gardens, Cape Town		Cape Town, Gardens	The Cape	Provincial Heritage Site	33°55′56″S 18°24′55″E	Upload Photo
9/2/018/0030/2	129-131 Hatfield Street, Lower Gardens, Cape Town					33°55′55″S 18°24′55″E	Upload Photo
9/2/018/0030/3	133 Hatfield Street, Lower Gardens, Cape Town					33°55′55″S 18°24′55″E	Upload Photo
9/2/018/0030/4	135 Hatfield Street, Lower Gardens, Cape Town					33°55′56″S 18°24′55″E	Upload Photo
9/2/018/0030/5	137 Hatfield Street, Lower Gardens, Cape Town					33°55′56″S 18°24′55″E	Upload Photo
9/2/018/0030/6	141 Hatfield Street, Lower Gardens, Cape Town					33°55′56″S 18°24′55″E	Upload Photo
9/2/018/0031	Semi-detached houses, Hanover Road, Fresnaye, Cape Town			Cape Town			Upload Photo
9/2/018/0031/01	"Dotsville" Hanover Road, Fresnaye, Erf 301, Cape Town			Cape Town			Upload Photo
9/2/018/0031/02	Stanley Cottage, Hanover Road, Fresnaye, Erf 302, Cape Town			Cape Town			Upload Photo
9/2/018/0032	Welgemeend, 2 Welgemeend Street, Gardens, Cape Town	Several estates on the slopes of Table Mountain above the Company’s garden and Rust en Vreugd were granted to free burghers and officials during the seventeenth century, and in the century that followed fine mansions were built on these lands..	Cape Town, Gardens	The Cape	Provincial Heritage Site	33°56′04″S 18°24′32″E	Several estates on the slopes of Table Mountain above the Company’s garden and Rust en Vreugd were granted to free burghers and officials during the seventeenth century, and in the century that followed fine mansions were built on these lands..
9/2/018/0034	Victoria & Alfred Waterfront, Granger Bay, Cape Town					33°54′11″S 18°25′22″E	
9/2/018/0034/001/02	Clock Tower, Table Bay Harbour, Cape Town	This Victorian clocktower with its Gothic characteristics was erected as a signal tower in 1883. Type of site: Clock Tower.	Cape Town, Victoria & Alfred Waterfront	The Cape	Provincial Heritage Site	33°54′23″S 18°25′20″E	This Victorian clocktower with its Gothic characteristics was erected as a signal tower in 1883. Type of site: Clock Tower. Media related to V&A Waterfront clock tower at Wikimedia Commons
9/2/018/0034/002/03	The Moorings, off Portswood Road, Victoria and Alfred Waterfront, Cape Town		Cape Town, Victoria and Alfred Waterfront	The Cape	Provisional Protection	33°54′21″S 18°25′05″E	Upload Photo Media related to Breakwater Prison at Wikimedia Commons
9/2/018/0034/002/04	Treadmill, Erf 15, Portswood Road, Victoria and Alfred Waterfront, Cape Town	Type of site: Treadmill.	Cape Town, Victoria and Alfred Waterfront	The Cape	Provisional Protection	33°54′19″S 18°25′05″E	Type of site: Treadmill. Media related to Treadmill, Breakwater Prison at Wikimedia Commons
9/2/018/0034/002/05	Old Labourers' Hostel, Portswood Road, Victoria and Alfred Waterfront, Cape Town		Cape Town, Victoria and Alfred Waterfront	The Cape	Provisional Protection	33°54′25″S 18°25′21″E	Upload Photo
9/2/018/0034/002/07	Ulundi, 1 Portswood Road, Victoria and Alfred Waterfront, Cape Town		Cape Town, Victoria and Alfred Waterfront	The Cape	Provisional Protection	33°54′23″S 18°25′00″E	Media related to Ulundi, Portswood Ridge at Wikimedia Commons
9/2/018/0034/002/08	Dockhouse No. 1 and No. 2, off Portswood Road, Portswood Ridge, Victoria and Alfred Waterfront, Cape Town		Cape Town, Victoria and Alfred Waterfront	The Cape	Provisional Protection	33°54′20″S 18°25′08″E	Media related to Dock House, Portswood Ridge at Wikimedia Commons
9/2/018/0034/002/09	Old Production Control Office, off Portswood Road, Portswood Ridge, Victoria and Alfred Waterfront, Cape Town		Cape Town, Victoria and Alfred Waterfront	The Cape	Provisional Protection	33°54′19″S 18°25′05″E	Upload Photo
9/2/018/0034/002/10	Embankment and Tunnel, off Portswood Road, Portswood Ridge, Victoria and Alfred Waterfront, Cape Town	Type of site: Tunnel.	Cape Town, Victoria and Alfred Waterfront	The Cape	Provisional Protection	33°54′20″S 18°25′06″E	Type of site: Tunnel. Media related to Embankment and tunnel, Portswood Ridge at Wikimedia Commons
9/2/018/0034/002/11	The Moorings Gateway and Boundary Wall, Portswood Road, Victoria and Alfred Waterfront, Cape Town		Cape Town, Victoria and Alfred Waterfront	The Cape	Provisional Protection	33°54′20″S 18°25′06″E	Upload Photo
9/2/018/0034/002/12	The Moorings No. 10, Quarry Road, Victoria and Alfred Waterfront, Cape Town		Cape Town, Victoria and Alfred Waterfront	The Cape	Provisional Protection	33°54′20″S 18°25′06″E	Upload Photo
9/2/018/0034/002/13	The Moorings No. 5, Quarry Road, Victoria and Alfred Waterfront, Cape Town	THE MOORINGS No. 5 Dwelling inspected: September 1982 Part single-, part double-storey dwelling. Single-storey: bluestone wall, pediment, raking brick coping, hardwood casement and fanlight with quoined moulded plaster surrounds, plaster string course.	Cape Town, Victoria and Alfred Waterfront	The Cape	Provisional Protection	33°54′23″S 18°25′06″E	Upload Photo
9/2/018/0034/002/14	The Moorings No. 2 and No. 3, off Portswood Road, Victoria and Alfred Waterfront, Cape Town	THE MOORINGS No. 2 AND No. 3 Dwellings inspected: September 1982 Double-storey, 3-bay, SW façade: Ground: plastered stoep wall and piers, steel roof sheeting. Centrally divided glazed and lower flush panelled teak door, fanlight, ovolo moulded frame.	Cape Town, Victoria and Alfred Waterfront	The Cape	Provisional Protection	33°54′20″S 18°25′05″E	THE MOORINGS No. 2 AND No. 3 Dwellings inspected: September 1982 Double-storey, 3-bay, SW façade: Ground: plastered stoep wall and piers, steel roof sheeting. Centrally divided glazed and lower flush panelled teak door, fanlight, ovolo moulded frame.
9/2/018/0034/002/15	The Moorings No. 1, off Portswood Road, Victoria and Alfred Waterfront, Cape Town	THE MOORINGS No. 1 Dwelling inspected: September 1982 Double-storey, SW corner unit contains fabric of original Breakwater Convict Station. Plastered bluestone (shown unplastered in c1890 photograph), pitched corrugated iron roof. Type of site: House.	Cape Town, Victoria and Alfred Waterfront	The Cape	Provisional Protection	33°54′20″S 18°25′06″E	THE MOORINGS No. 1 Dwelling inspected: September 1982 Double-storey, SW corner unit contains fabric of original Breakwater Convict Station. Plastered bluestone (shown unplastered in c1890 photograph), pitched corrugated iron roof. Type of site: House.
9/2/018/0034/002/16	Garages, off Portswood Road, Victoria and Alfred Waterfront, Cape Town		Cape Town, Victoria and Alfred Waterfront	The Cape	Provisional Protection	33°54′25″S 18°25′21″E	Upload Photo
9/2/018/0034/002/18	Time Ball Tower, Portswood Ridge, Victoria and Alfred Waterfront, Cape Town	This tower, which was erected in 1883, was used as a repeater-station for harbour signals between the Observatory and Signal Hill. In 1895 the tower was raised from 17 feet to 34 feet. The ball, which was hand-operated at first, was electrified in 1903. Type of site: Time Ball Tower.	Cape Town, Victoria and Alfred Waterfront	The Cape	Provincial Heritage Site	33°54′21″S 18°25′09″E	This tower, which was erected in 1883, was used as a repeater-station for harbour signals between the Observatory and Signal Hill. In 1895 the tower was raised from 17 feet to 34 feet. The ball, which was hand-operated at first, was electrified in 1903. Type of site: Time Ball Tower. Media related to Time ball tower, V&A Waterfront at Wikimedia Commons
9/2/018/0034/01	Pierhead Precinct, Victoria and Alfred Waterfront, Granger Bay,					33°54′21″S 18°25′17″E	Upload Photo
9/2/018/0034/01/01	Ferryman's Tavern, Victoria and Alfred Waterfront, Granger Bay,				Provincial Heritage Site	33°54′18″S 18°25′10″E	
9/2/018/0034/01/03	Old Electric Power and lighting station, Pierhead Precinct, Victoria and Waterfront			Cape Town			Upload Photo
9/2/018/0034/02	Portswood Precinct, Victoria and Alfred Waterfront, Granger Bay, Cape Town			Cape Town			Upload Photo
9/2/018/0034/02/01	The Moorings, No 6, Erf 15, Off Portswood Road, Victoria and Alfred			Cape Town			Upload Photo
9/2/018/0034/02/02	Hostel Kitchen, Erf 15, Off Portswood Road, Victoria and Alfred			Cape Town			Upload Photo
9/2/018/0034/02/03	The Moorings, Erf 15, Off Portswood Road, Victoria and Alfred			Cape Town			Upload Photo
9/2/018/0034/02/04	Treadmill, Erf 15, Off Portswood Road, Victoria and Alfred			Cape Town			Upload Photo
9/2/018/0034/02/05	Labourer's Hostel, Erf 15, Portswood Road, Victoria and Alfred			Cape Town			Upload Photo
9/2/018/0034/02/07	Ulundi Dwelling, Erf 1, Portswood Road, Victoria and Alfred			Cape Town			Upload Photo
9/2/018/0034/02/08	Dockhouse, No1 and 2 Erf 1, The Ridge, Victoria and Alfred			Cape Town	prov decl 1991-1997		Upload Photo
9/2/018/0034/02/09	Production Control Office, Erf 1, The Ridge, Victoria and Alfred			Cape Town			Upload Photo
9/2/018/0034/02/10	Embankment & Tunnel, Erf 1, The Ridge, Victoria and Alfred Waterfront,			Cape Town			Upload Photo
9/2/018/0034/02/11	The Moorings, Gateway & Boundary Wall, Erf 16, Portswood Road,			Cape Town			Upload Photo
9/2/018/0034/02/12	Windermere, The Moorings No 10, Quarry Road, Victoria and Alfred			Cape Town			Upload Photo
9/2/018/0034/02/13	The Moorings No 5, Erf 1, Quarry Road, Victoria and Alfred			Cape Town			Upload Photo
9/2/018/0034/02/14	The Moorings No 2 & 3, Erven 1 & 16, Off Portswood Road, Victoria and			Cape Town			Upload Photo
9/2/018/0034/02/15	The Moorings No 1, Erven 1 & 16, Off Portswood Road, Victoria & Alfred			Cape Town			Upload Photo
9/2/018/0034/02/16	Garages, Erf 16, Off Portwood Road, Victoria and Alfred Waterfront,			Cape Town			Upload Photo
9/2/018/0034/02/17	Breakwater Prison, Erf 14, Cape Town			Cape Town			Upload Photo
9/2/018/0034/02/18	Time Ball Tower, Victoria and Alfred Waterfront, Cape Town			Cape Town			Upload Photo
9/2/018/0034/03	New Basin Precinct, Victoria & Alfred Waterfront, Granger Bay, Cape			Cape Town			Upload Photo
9/2/018/0034/03/1	Amsterdam Battery, 11 & 13 Port Road, Cape Town					33°54′44″S 18°25′13″E	Upload Photo
9/2/018/0034/04	Gateway Precinct, Victoria & Alfred Waterfront, Cape Town			Cape Town			Upload Photo
9/2/018/0034/05	South Arm, V&A Waterfront, Cape Town			Cape Town			Upload Photo
9/2/018/0034/06	Granger Bay, V & A Waterfront, Cape Town			Cape Town			Upload Photo
9/2/018/0034/07	Breakwater Precinct, Victoria and Alfred Waterfront, Cape Town			Cape Town			Upload Photo
9/2/018/0034/08	Clock Tower precinct, V & A (Chavonnes battery)					33°54′24″S 18°25′20″E	
9/2/018/0034/09	Upper Basin Precinct, V& A Waterfront/ Marina			Cape Town			Upload Photo
9/2/018/0036	Belvedere Building, cnr Bouquet and St John's Streets, Cape Town	Type of site: House Previous use: Hotel / offices. Current use: Commercial.	Cape Town, Central	The Cape	Provincial Heritage Site	33°55′42″S 18°25′08″E	Type of site: House Previous use: Hotel / offices. Current use: Commercial.
9/2/018/0038	Block bounded by Loop, Prestwich, Long and Riebeeck Streets, Cape Town			Cape Town			Upload Photo
9/2/018/0040	St George's Mall, St George's Street, Cape Town					33°55′20″S 18°25′19″E	Upload Photo
9/2/018/0041	86 Hout Street, Cape Town					33°55′14″S 18°25′09″E	Upload Photo
9/2/018/0042	St Stephen's Church, Riebeeck Square, Cape Town	The only building on Riebeeck Square is St. Stephen’s Church, but it was, in fact, the first theatre or, as the Coloured people called it, the first ""komediehuis"" in South Africa. Type of site: Church. Previous use: Theatre. Current use: Church : Dutch Reformed Mission. This building was opened as a theatre in 1800 and was taken into use as a church and school in 1839.	Cape Town, Central	The Cape	Provincial Heritage Site	33°55′16″S 18°25′04″E	The only building on Riebeeck Square is St. Stephen’s Church, but it was, in fact, the first theatre or, as the Coloured people called it, the first ""komediehuis"" in South Africa. Type of site: Church. Previous use: Theatre. Current use: Church : Dutch Reformed Mission. This building was opened as a theatre in 1800 and was taken into use as a church and school in 1839.
9/2/018/0042/1	Old organ, St Stephen's Church, Riebeeck Square Cape Town			Cape Town			Upload Photo
9/2/018/0043	CAPE TOWN MUNICIPAL AREA, GENERAL			Cape Town			Upload Photo
9/2/018/0045	Cape Heritage House, 67-73 Burg Street, Cape Town	Type of site: Commercial.	Cape Town, Central	The Cape	Provincial Heritage Site	33°55′25″S 18°25′10″E	Upload Photo
9/2/018/0046	8, 10, 12 and 12a Vredehoek Avenue, Oranjezicht, cape Town			Cape Town		33°56′12″S 18°25′06″E	Upload Photo
9/2/018/0046/01	8 Vredehoek Avenue, Oranjezicht, Cape Town			Cape Town		33°56′12″S 18°25′06″E	Upload Photo
9/2/018/0046/02	10 Vredehoek Avenue, Oranjezicht, Cape Town			Cape Town		33°56′12″S 18°25′06″E	Upload Photo
9/2/018/0046/03	12 Vredehoek Avenue, Oranjezicht, Cape Town			Cape Town		33°56′12″S 18°25′06″E	Upload Photo
9/2/018/0046/04	12a Vredehoek Avenue, Oranjezicht, Cape Town			Cape Town		33°56′12″S 18°25′06″E	Upload Photo
9/2/018/0047	79-81 Kloof Street, Gardens, Cape Town			Cape Town		33°55′50″S 18°24′38″E	Upload Photo
9/2/018/0047/001	79 Kloof Street, Gardens, Cape Town		Cape Town, Gardens	The Cape	Provincial Heritage Site	33°55′50″S 18°24′38″E	Upload Photo
9/2/018/0047/002	81 Kloof Street, Gardens, Cape Town		Cape Town, Gardens	The Cape	Provincial Heritage Site	33°55′50″S 18°24′38″E	Upload Photo
9/2/018/0050	3-5, 7 and 9 Breda Street, Earl's Court, Hiddingh Avenue, Model Villa, Hiddingh Avenue, Gardens, Cape Town		Cape Town, Gardens	The Cape	Provisional Protection	33°56′05″S 18°24′59″E	
9/2/018/0050/001	3-5 Breda Street, Gardens, Cape Town		Cape Town, Gardens	The Cape	Provisional Protection	33°56′04″S 18°24′59″E	Upload Photo
9/2/018/0050/002	7 Breda Street, Gardens, Cape Town	s/s Type of site: House.	Cape Town, Gardens	The Cape	Provisional Protection	33°56′05″S 18°24′59″E	s/s Type of site: House.
9/2/018/0050/003	9 Breda Street, Gardens, Cape Town		Cape Town, Gardens	The Cape	Provisional Protection	33°56′05″S 18°24′59″E	Upload Photo
9/2/018/0050/004	Earl's Court, 6 Hiddingh Avenue, Gardens, Cape Town		Cape Town, Gardens	The Cape	Provisional Protection	33°56′04″S 18°25′00″E	Upload Photo
9/2/018/0050/005	Model Villa, 4 Hiddingh Avenue, Gardens, Cape Town	Type of site: House	Cape Town, Gardens	The Cape	Provisional Protection	33°56′03″S 18°25′00″E	Upload Photo
9/2/018/0051	Valkenberg Hospital building complex, Observatory, Cape Town	Type of site: Hospital	Cape Town, Observatory	The Cape	Provincial Heritage Site	33°56′21″S 18°28′54″E	Upload Photo
9/2/018/0052	Victoria Court, 301-305 Long Street, Cape Town			Cape Town		33°55′38″S 18°24′52″E	Upload Photo
9/2/018/0054	Wolseley House, 22 Sophia Street, Oranjezicht, Cape Town		Cape Town, Oranjezicht	The Cape	Provincial Heritage Site	33°56′26″S 18°25′00″E	
9/2/018/0055	Carl Hermann Building, 5-7 Corporation Street, Cape Town	Type of site: Commercial.	Cape Town, Central	The Cape	Provincial Heritage Site	33°55′34″S 18°25′21″E	Type of site: Commercial. Media related to Carl Hermann Building at Wikimedia Commons
9/2/018/0056	The Castle of Good Hope, Cape Town	Main article: Castle of Good Hope On 8 April 1652, Jan van Riebeeck took possession of the "Cape Outpost" in the name of the United East India Company and their most Noble and High Mightinesses the States General of the United Netherlands. He built his "Fort of Good Hope". Type of site: Fort.	Cape Town, Central	The Cape	National Heritage Site	33°55′33″S 18°25′40″E	On 8 April 1652, Jan van Riebeeck took possession of the "Cape Outpost" in the name of the United East India Company and their most Noble and High Mightinesses the States General of the United Netherlands. He built his "Fort of Good Hope". Type of site: Fort. Media related to Castle of Good Hope at Wikimedia Commons
9/2/018/0056/01	The William Fehr Collection, Castle, Rust en Vreugd			Cape Town		33°55′34″S 18°25′41″E	Upload Photo
9/2/018/0058	Stuttafords Building, Adderley Street, Cape Town			Cape Town			Upload Photo
9/2/018/0059	Stone wall, Buitengracht, Cape Town	Type of site: Wall.	Cape Town, Central	The Cape	National Heritage Site	33°55′28″S 18°24′47″E	Type of site: Wall.
9/2/018/0059-001	VR Post Box, Buitengracht, Cape Town	Type of site: Post Box Current use: Post box.	Cape Town, Central	The Cape	Provincial Heritage Site	33°55′28″S 18°24′47″E	Type of site: Post Box Current use: Post box.
9/2/018/0060	6 Bellevue Street, Oranjezicht, Cape Town		Cape Town, Oranjezicht	The Cape	Provincial Heritage Site	33°56′12″S 18°24′16″E	
9/2/018/0061	Gardens Presbyterian Church, 151 Hatfield Street, Gardens, Cape Town	Type of site: Church Current use: Church : Presbyterian.	Cape Town, Gardens	The Cape	Provincial Heritage Site	33°55′59″S 18°24′51″E	Type of site: Church Current use: Church : Presbyterian.
9/2/018/0063	ICS Building, 10 Dock Road, Cape Town	Type of site: Commercial Current use: Offices / Shops.	Cape Town, Central	The Cape	Provincial Heritage Site	33°54′17″S 18°25′06″E	Upload Photo
9/2/018/0065	Van Rheede van Oudtshoorn Vault, Faure Street, Gardens, Cape Town	Type of site: Vault.	Cape Town, Gardens	The Cape	Provincial Heritage Site	33°55′51″S 18°24′41″E	Type of site: Vault. Media related to Van Reede van Oudtshoorn Vault at Wikimedia Commons
9/2/018/0066	Moravian Church and Parsonage, Moravian Hill, District Six, Cape Town	Type of site: Church and Parsonage Current use: Church : Moravian.	Cape Town, District Six	The Cape	Provincial Heritage Site	33°55′55″S 18°25′57″E	Type of site: Church and Parsonage Current use: Church : Moravian.
9/2/018/0068	Grand Parade, Cape Town	Main article: Grand Parade (Cape Town) The Parade is inseparably associated with the Castle of Good Hope. Most of the garrison at the Cape were billeted in the Castle and a parade ground was essential for their proper training. Consequently steps were taken even before the Castle was completed. The Grand Parade is one of Cape Town's historical squares and was the military parade ground during the eighteenth and nineteenth centuries.	Cape Town, Central	The Cape	Provincial Heritage Site	33°55′29″S 18°25′28″E	The Parade is inseparably associated with the Castle of Good Hope. Most of the garrison at the Cape were billeted in the Castle and a parade ground was essential for their proper training. Consequently steps were taken even before the Castle was completed. The Grand Parade is one of Cape Town's historical squares and was the military parade ground during the eighteenth and nineteenth centuries. Media related to Grand Parade, Cape Town at Wikimedia Commons
9/2/018/0069	Sunny Lodge, 3 Flower Street, Gardens, Cape Town			Cape Town		33°56′16″S 18°25′03″E	Upload Photo
9/2/018/0070	Dunkley Mews, 14 Wandel Street, 14-26 Dunkley Street, 31 Barnet			Cape Town		33°55′55″S 18°25′01″E	
9/2/018/0070/001	18 Dunkley Street, Gardens, Cape Town		Cape Town, Gardens	The Cape	Provincial Heritage Site	33°55′54″S 18°25′00″E	
9/2/018/0070/002	22 Dunkley Street, Gardens, Cape Town		Cape Town, Gardens	The Cape	Provincial Heritage Site	33°55′54″S 18°25′01″E	
9/2/018/0070/003	24 Dunkley Street, Gardens, Cape Town		Cape Town, Gardens	The Cape	Provincial Heritage Site	33°55′54″S 18°25′01″E	
9/2/018/0070/004	Maria's Greek Restaurant, 31 Barnet Street, Gardens, Cape Town	These five properties form an integral part of a row of nine double-storeyed Cape-Georgian terraced houses that were erected in 1886 by William James Hatfield. The corner shop units were added in 1901. Current use: Restaurant.	Cape Town, Gardens	The Cape	Provincial Heritage Site	33°55′53″S 18°25′00″E	Upload Photo
9/2/018/0070/005	14 Dunkley Street, Gardens, Cape Town	These five properties form an integral part of a row of nine double-storeyed Cape-Georgian terraced houses that were erected in 1886 by William James Hatfield. The corner shop units were added in 1901.	Cape Town, Gardens	The Cape	Provincial Heritage Site	33°55′54″S 18°25′00″E	These five properties form an integral part of a row of nine double-storeyed Cape-Georgian terraced houses that were erected in 1886 by William James Hatfield. The corner shop units were added in 1901.
9/2/018/0070/006	16 Dunkley Street, Gardens, Cape Town	These five properties form an integral part of a row of nine double-storeyed Cape-Georgian terraced houses that were erected in 1886 by William James Hatfield. The corner shop units were added in 1901.	Cape Town, Gardens	The Cape	Provincial Heritage Site	33°55′54″S 18°25′00″E	Upload Photo
9/2/018/0070/007	20 Dunkley Street, Gardens, Cape Town	These five properties form an integral part of a row of nine double-storeyed Cape-Georgian terraced houses that were erected in 1886 by William James Hatfield. The corner shop units were added in 1901.	Cape Town, Gardens	The Cape	Provincial Heritage Site	33°55′54″S 18°25′01″E	These five properties form an integral part of a row of nine double-storeyed Cape-Georgian terraced houses that were erected in 1886 by William James Hatfield. The corner shop units were added in 1901.
9/2/018/0070/009	Roxy, 14 Wandel Street, Gardens, Cape Town	Current use: Restaurant. These five properties form an integral part of a row of nine double-storeyed Cape-Georgian terraced houses that were erected in 1886 by William James Hatfield. The corner shop units were added in 1901.	Cape Town, Gardens	The Cape	Provincial Heritage Site	33°55′55″S 18°25′01″E	Current use: Restaurant. These five properties form an integral part of a row of nine double-storeyed Cape-Georgian terraced houses that were erected in 1886 by William James Hatfield. The corner shop units were added in 1901.
9/2/018/0070/8	26 Dunkley Street, Gardens, Cape Town			Cape Town		33°55′55″S 18°25′01″E	Upload Photo
9/2/018/0071	158 Buitengracht, Cape Town		Cape Town, Bo-Kaap	The Cape	Provincial Heritage Site	33°55′22″S 18°24′52″E	Upload Photo
9/2/018/0072	151, 159–161 Loop Street, Cape Town			Cape Town		33°55′26″S 18°24′59″E	Upload Photo
9/2/018/0073	SA Museum, Queen Victoria Street, Cape Town			Cape Town		33°55′43″S 18°24′54″E	
9/2/018/0074	2-12 Grove Road, Mowbray, Cape Town			Cape Town		33°56′45″S 18°28′22″E	
9/2/018/0074/3	6 Gove Road, Mowbray, Cape Town			Cape Town		33°56′45″S 18°28′22″E	Upload Photo
9/2/018/0078	65-69 Buitengracht Street, Cape Town			Cape Town		33°55′13″S 18°25′05″E	Upload Photo
9/2/018/0079	Lutheran Church, Strand Street, Cape Town	This unique group of eighteenth century buildings stands in Strand Street, higher up and across the street from Koopmans-de Wet House. It owes its attraction to the fact that these buildings were designed as an architectural entity. Type of site: Church.	Cape Town, Central	The Cape	Provincial Heritage Site	33°55′08″S 18°25′10″E	This unique group of eighteenth century buildings stands in Strand Street, higher up and across the street from Koopmans-de Wet House. It owes its attraction to the fact that these buildings were designed as an architectural entity. Type of site: Church. Media related to Lutheran Church, Strand Street at Wikimedia Commons
9/2/018/0080	see 9/2/111/0060			Cape Town			Upload Photo
9/2/018/0082	Methodist Publishing House, cnr Church & Burg Street, Cape Town			Cape Town		33°55′24″S 18°25′09″E	Upload Photo
9/2/018/0085	71 Roeland Street, Cape Town	Architectural style: EDWARDIAN. Type of site: Commercial. Current use: Commercial.	Cape Town, Central	The Cape	Provincial Heritage Site	33°55′45″S 18°25′18″E	Architectural style: EDWARDIAN. Type of site: Commercial. Current use: Commercial.
9/2/018/0086	Centre for the Book, Queen Victoria Street, Cape Town	Architectural style: Edwardian. Type of site: Government. Previous use: Archives. Current use: Library.	Cape Town, Central	The Cape	Provincial Heritage Site	33°55′37″S 18°24′57″E	Architectural style: Edwardian. Type of site: Government. Previous use: Archives. Current use: Library. Media related to Centre for the Book at Wikimedia Commons
9/2/018/0087	Silverknowles, 20 Brownlow Street, Tamboerskloof, Cape Town		Cape Town, Tamboerskloof	The Cape	Provincial Heritage Site	33°55′38″S 18°24′18″E	Upload Photo
9/2/018/0088	Oslo House, 1 Belvedere Avenue, Oranjezicht, Cape Town	Type of site: House.	Cape Town, Oranjezicht	The Cape	Provincial Heritage Site	33°56′23″S 18°24′54″E	Type of site: House.
9/2/018/0091	Table Bay Panorama Painting, by J L Pickering (1885), Cape Town			The Cape	Heritage Object	33°55′22″S 18°25′12″E	Upload Photo
9/2/018/0092	Greenmarket Square, Cape Town	Greenmarket Square – one of the squares around which Cape Town developed. In early times it was the site of the vegetable and fruit market. During the seventeenth century a number of streets came into existence above fashionable Sea Street (Strand Street) in which the Koopmans-de Wet House and the unique group of buildings of the Lutheran Church still survive today. Type of site: Square.	Cape Town, Central	The Cape	Provincial Heritage Site	33°55′22″S 18°25′12″E	Greenmarket Square – one of the squares around which Cape Town developed. In early times it was the site of the vegetable and fruit market. During the seventeenth century a number of streets came into existence above fashionable Sea Street (Strand Street) in which the Koopmans-de Wet House and the unique group of buildings of the Lutheran Church still survive today. Type of site: Square. Media related to Greenmarket Square at Wikimedia Commons
9/2/018/0093	Bellevue, St John's Hostel, Upper Kloof Street, Gardens, Cape Town		Cape Town, Higgovale	The Cape	Provincial Heritage Site	33°56′18″S 18°24′07″E	Upload Photo
9/2/018/0094	Mount Nelson Hotel, Oranje Street, Gardens			Cape Town		33°55′54″S 18°24′45″E	
9/2/018/0094/003	Outbuildings, Mount Nelson Hotel, Orange Street, Gardens, Cape Town	Type of site: Outbuilding.	Cape Town, Gardens	The Cape	Provincial Heritage Site	33°55′54″S 18°24′41″E	Type of site: Outbuilding.
9/2/018/0094/01	Taunton House & Taunton Cottage, 6 & 8 Hof Street, Gardens, Cape Town			Cape Town		33°55′55″S 18°24′46″E	Upload Photo
9/2/018/0094/02	10 Hof Street, Gardens, Cape Town			Cape Town		33°55′56″S 18°24′45″E	Upload Photo
9/2/018/0094/04	Buitenkommen Tuin (Helmsley Hotel) Hof Street, Gardens Cape Town			Cape Town			Upload Photo
9/2/018/0095	see 9/2/111/0020			Cape Town			Upload Photo
9/2/018/0096	Longkloof Complex, Kloof Street, Gardens, Cape Town			Cape Town			Upload Photo
9/2/018/0097	Ammunition Magazine, Tamboerskloof, Cape Town	Type of site: Magazine.	Cape Town, Tamboerskloof	The Cape	Provincial Heritage Site	33°55′30″S 18°24′29″E	Upload Photo
9/2/018/0098	Zorgvliet, Sir George Grey Street, Gardens, Cape Town	Zorgvliet is one of the oldest properties in the Cape and dates, according to Dr. Mary Cook, back to 1669, when a small freehold grant of 2 morgan was made to Matthuys Coeymans. In 1774 it was in the possession of Hendrik Oostewald Eksteen. Type of site: House. Current use: House. This house with its Cape Dutch and Victorian characteristics is situated on one of the oldest properties in the Cape Province. The property was granted to Matthys Coeymans as early as 1669. The Victorianisation dates from the 1850s when tall shuttered Victorian casements replaced the half sashes. Other woodwork was also altered in the interests of prestigious living and the doorways in the front facade were replaced with wide neo-gothic doors.	Cape Town, Gardens	The Cape	Provincial Heritage Site	33°56′18″S 18°24′57″E	Upload Photo
9/2/018/0100	Rust en Vreugd, Buitenkant Street, Cape Town	Rust en Vreugd is one of the few impressive and beautifully finished town houses that survived from the eighteenth century. It is situated on land that, according to old maps of Cape Town, had already been granted to a free burgher in the 17th century. Type of site: House. Previous use: House. Current use: Museum.	Cape Town, Central	The Cape	Provincial Heritage Site	33°55′49″S 18°25′14″E	Rust en Vreugd is one of the few impressive and beautifully finished town houses that survived from the eighteenth century. It is situated on land that, according to old maps of Cape Town, had already been granted to a free burgher in the 17th century. Type of site: House. Previous use: House. Current use: Museum. Media related to Rust en Vreugd at Wikimedia Commons
9/2/018/0101	Huguenot House, 66-66a Loop Street, Cape Town			Cape Town		33°55′15″S 18°25′10″E	Upload Photo
9/2/018/0102	Tafelberg Dutch Reformed Church, Buitenkant Street, Cape Town	This late Victorian church complex which dates from 1892 was given in trust to the Nieuwe Kerk by Susanna Maria Johanna Hertzog with the stipulation that when a self supporting congregation came into being in the area, it be transferred to them. The Church complex divides into three sections: the symmetrical fronted Church itself, the Cornelia Home on Cornelia Avenue, and the William Frederick School Building on Commercial Street. The Church building has a finely carved corner foundation stone. Type of site: Church. Current use: Church : Dutch Reformed.	Cape Town, Central	The Cape	Provincial Heritage Site	33°55′43″S 18°25′22″E	This late Victorian church complex which dates from 1892 was given in trust to the Nieuwe Kerk by Susanna Maria Johanna Hertzog with the stipulation that when a self supporting congregation came into being in the area, it be transferred to them. The Church complex divides into three sections: the symmetrical fronted Church itself, the Cornelia Home on Cornelia Avenue, and the William Frederick School Building on Commercial Street. The Church building has a finely carved corner foundation stone. Type of site: Church. Current use: Church : Dutch Reformed.
9/2/018/0103	Milestones, Main Road, Cape Town			Cape Town			Upload Photo
9/2/018/0104	Rolfes House, 6 Dorman Street, Cape Town			Cape Town		33°55′44″S 18°24′45″E	Upload Photo
9/2/018/0105	First National Bank, Adderley Street, Cape Town			Cape Town		33°55′24″S 18°25′17″E	
9/2/018/0106	Groote Kerk, Adderley Street, Cape Town	The first church on this land was built in 1678. It was replaced by the present building in 1841, but the original tower was retained. The pulpit is the work of Anton Anreith and the carpenter Jacob Graaff and was put into use in 1789. Type of site: Church. Current use: Church : Dutch Reformed.	Cape Town, Central	The Cape	Provincial Heritage Site	33°55′29″S 18°25′15″E	The first church on this land was built in 1678. It was replaced by the present building in 1841, but the original tower was retained. The pulpit is the work of Anton Anreith and the carpenter Jacob Graaff and was put into use in 1789. Type of site: Church. Current use: Church : Dutch Reformed. Media related to Groote Kerk, Cape Town at Wikimedia Commons
9/2/018/0107	Riebeeck Square (block bounded by Shortmarket, Bree, Church and Buitengracht Streets), Cape Town	Riebeeck Square – one of the squares round which Cape Town developed. It was first known as Boeren-plein, and later as Hottentot Square. Here the farmers outspanned their wagons and off-loaded their products. During the seventeenth century Cape Town expanded for the most part from the sea towards Table Mountain along the axis of the Heerengracht or Adderley Street. During the eighteenth century it expanded laterally also, and began to fill Table Valley. Type of site: Square.	Cape Town, Central	The Cape	Provincial Heritage Site	33°55′16″S 18°25′03″E	Riebeeck Square – one of the squares round which Cape Town developed. It was first known as Boeren-plein, and later as Hottentot Square. Here the farmers outspanned their wagons and off-loaded their products. During the seventeenth century Cape Town expanded for the most part from the sea towards Table Mountain along the axis of the Heerengracht or Adderley Street. During the eighteenth century it expanded laterally also, and began to fill Table Valley. Type of site: Square.
9/2/018/0110	Old YMCA, 60 Queen Victoria Street, Cape Town			Cape Town		33°55′38″S 18°24′58″E	Upload Photo
9/2/018/0111	St. Andrew's Presbyterian Church, Somerset Road, Cape Town			Cape Town			Upload Photo
9/2/018/0113	Old Drill Hall, Darling Street, Cape Town	Type of site: Drill Hall Previous use: Drill hall.	Cape Town, Central	The Cape	Provincial Heritage Site	33°55′33″S 18°25′28″E	Type of site: Drill Hall Previous use: Drill hall. Media related to Old Drill Hall, Darling Street at Wikimedia Commons
9/2/018/0114	50 Orange Street, Gardens, Cape Town	Type of site: House Previous use: House. Current use: Restaurant. Once threatened by decay and demolition, this fine Cape Georgian building, constructed for the Lieschings, one of the Cape's most prominent families, has been restored to form one of the finest remaining examples of its particular architectural period in	Cape Town, Gardens	The Cape	Register	33°55′44″S 18°24′47″E	Upload Photo
9/2/018/0115	City Hall, Darling Street, Cape Town	Type of site: City Hall Current use: City Hall. This City Hall which is predominantly in the Italian Renaissance style, was designed by the architects Harry Austin Reid and Frederick George Green of Johannesburg and erected by the builders Thomas Howard and John Gibson Scott. The corner-stone was laid	Cape Town, Central	The Cape	Provincial Heritage Site	33°55′31″S 18°25′27″E	Type of site: City Hall Current use: City Hall. This City Hall which is predominantly in the Italian Renaissance style, was designed by the architects Harry Austin Reid and Frederick George Green of Johannesburg and erected by the builders Thomas Howard and John Gibson Scott. The corner-stone was laid Media related to Cape Town City Hall at Wikimedia Commons
9/2/018/0116	Zonnebloem College Complex, Woodstock, Cape Town			Cape Town			Upload Photo
9/2/018/0117	2 Dorman Street, Gardens, Cape Town		Cape Town, Gardens	The Cape	Provisional Protection	33°55′44″S 18°24′46″E	Upload Photo
9/2/018/0118	City and Civil Service Club, Queen Victoria Street, Cape Town			Cape Town			Upload Photo
9/2/018/0119	4 Dorman Street, Gardens, Cape Town			Cape Town		33°55′44″S 18°24′46″E	Upload Photo
9/2/018/0120	Block bounded by Adderley, Longmarket & Parliament Streets, Cape Town			Cape Town			Upload Photo
9/2/018/0121	Old YMCA Building, 44 Long Street, Cape Town	Architectural style: VICTORIAN. Type of site: YMCA Current use: Commercial.	Cape Town, Central	The Cape	Provincial Heritage Site	33°55′17″S 18°25′13″E	Architectural style: VICTORIAN. Type of site: YMCA Current use: Commercial.
9/2/018/0122	Coowatool Islam Mosque, 214 Loop Street, Cape Town	Architectural style: CLASSICAL MIHRAB. Type of site: Mosque Current use: Mosque.	Cape Town, Central	The Cape	Provincial Heritage Site	33°55′35″S 18°24′49″E	Architectural style: CLASSICAL MIHRAB. Type of site: Mosque Current use: Mosque.
9/2/018/0123	"Klein Melkbosch", Melkboschstrand, Cape Town			Cape Town			Upload Photo
9/2/018/0124	Millners Dental Suppliers, 88 Long Street, Cape Town			Cape Town		33°55′20″S 18°25′09″E	Upload Photo
9/2/018/0125	Metropolitan Methodist Church, Greenmarket Square, Cape Town			Cape Town		33°55′22″S 18°25′11″E	Upload Photo
9/2/018/0126	"HMS Sceptre Memorial", Cape Town Harbour, Cape Town			Cape Town			Upload Photo
9/2/018/0127/001	Botuin, Leeuwenhof, Hof Street, Cape Town	Above Hof Street, just behind Leeuwenhof, the official residence of the Administrator of the Cape, there is an interesting little group of buildings known as Botuin. It consists of a gabled house, a long building at right angles to it and high garden wall Type of site: House Current use: Residential. "Botuin" was a portion of the historical old farm Leeuwenhof.	Cape Town, Oranjezicht	The Cape	Provincial Heritage Site	33°56′19″S 18°24′21″E	Above Hof Street, just behind Leeuwenhof, the official residence of the Administrator of the Cape, there is an interesting little group of buildings known as Botuin. It consists of a gabled house, a long building at right angles to it and high garden wall Type of site: House Current use: Residential. "Botuin" was a portion of the historical old farm Leeuwenhof.
9/2/018/0127/002	Leeuwenhof, Hof Street, Cape Town	This important old Cape house, at present the official residence of the Administrator of the Cape Province, was built circa 1782 by J. C. Bräsler. 1693 Simon van der Stel granted land to Guillaum Heems, a Burgher Councillor at the Cape. House probably bu Type of site: House. This important old Cape house, at present the official residence of the Administrator of the Cape Province, was built circa 1782 by J. C. Bräsler.	Cape Town, Oranjezicht	The Cape	Provincial Heritage Site	33°56′17″S 18°24′21″E	This important old Cape house, at present the official residence of the Administrator of the Cape Province, was built circa 1782 by J. C. Bräsler. 1693 Simon van der Stel granted land to Guillaum Heems, a Burgher Councillor at the Cape. House probably bu Type of site: House. This important old Cape house, at present the official residence of the Administrator of the Cape Province, was built circa 1782 by J. C. Bräsler.
9/2/018/0128	Block bounded by Bree, Shortmarket, Hout & Buitengracht Streets, Erven 2081			Cape Town		33°55′14″S 18°25′06″E	
9/2/018/0128-001	108 Shortmarket Street, Cape Town	Architectural style: CAPE DUTCH ELEMENTS. Current use: Commercial.	Cape Town, Central	The Cape	Provincial Heritage Site	33°55′14″S 18°25′04″E	Architectural style: CAPE DUTCH ELEMENTS. Current use: Commercial.
9/2/018/0131	Inn on the Square, Greenmarket Square, Cape Town		Cape Town, Central	The Cape	Provincial Heritage Site	33°55′21″S 18°25′11″E	
9/2/018/0132	Old Synagogue Jewish Museum, Gardens Avenue & Hatfield Street			Cape Town		33°55′52″S 18°24′58″E	Upload Photo
9/2/018/0133	Old Granary, Buitenkant Street, Cape Town			Cape Town			Media related to The Granary, Cape Town at Wikimedia Commons
9/2/018/0134	Old gracht walls, Castle Street, Cape Town			Cape Town		33°55′30″S 18°25′34″E	Upload Photo
9/2/018/0135	Platteklip and mill, Van Riebeeck Park, Oranjezicht, Cape Town			Cape Town		33°56′39″S 18°25′04″E	Upload Photo
9/2/018/0137	St. Philip's Chapel,. Chapel Street, Zonnebloem			Cape Town		33°55′45″S 18°26′09″E	Upload Photo
9/2/018/0138	St. Mark's Church, St. Mark's Street, Zonnebloem, Cape Town			Cape Town		33°55′52″S 18°25′52″E	Upload Photo
9/2/018/0139	De Waal Park, Gardens, Cape Town	This park was originally part of the Van Breda estate, Oranjezicht. For 170 years the estate belonged to this family and it extended from the Platteklip Gorge against the slope of Table Mountain to Molteno Road and Camp Street. Type of site: Park. The De Waal Park was laid out through the endeavours of David Christiaan de Waal, M.L.A., Mayor of Cape Town (1889-90) and opened in 1895 as a park for the use of the general public.	Cape Town, Gardens	The Cape	Provincial Heritage Site	33°56′12″S 18°24′45″E	This park was originally part of the Van Breda estate, Oranjezicht. For 170 years the estate belonged to this family and it extended from the Platteklip Gorge against the slope of Table Mountain to Molteno Road and Camp Street. Type of site: Park. The De Waal Park was laid out through the endeavours of David Christiaan de Waal, M.L.A., Mayor of Cape Town (1889-90) and opened in 1895 as a park for the use of the general public. Media related to De Waal Park at Wikimedia Commons
9/2/018/0140	Church Square, Cape Town	Church Square.- One of the squares round which Cape Town developed. It was the square used by churchgoers of the Groote Kerk. While he was still occupied with the building of his fort, Jan van Riebeeck started to lay out a garden between the fort and the Fresh River. As time went on, the garden was extended in the direction of the mountain. Type of site: Square.	Cape Town, Central	The Cape	Provincial Heritage Site	33°55′31″S 18°25′17″E	Church Square.- One of the squares round which Cape Town developed. It was the square used by churchgoers of the Groote Kerk. While he was still occupied with the building of his fort, Jan van Riebeeck started to lay out a garden between the fort and the Fresh River. As time went on, the garden was extended in the direction of the mountain. Type of site: Square. Media related to Church Square, Cape Town at Wikimedia Commons
9/2/018/0141	Old Town House, Greenmarket Square, Cape Town	This building stands as a proud example of eighteenth century architecture and symbolises the development of local government in Cape Town. When free colonists were created the Company granted them representation in the Council of Justice. Type of site: Town Hall.	Cape Town, Central	The Cape	Provincial Heritage Site	33°55′23″S 18°25′12″E	This building stands as a proud example of eighteenth century architecture and symbolises the development of local government in Cape Town. When free colonists were created the Company granted them representation in the Council of Justice. Type of site: Town Hall.
9/2/018/0142	Rheezicht, Gorge Road, Cape Town	Type of site: House Current use: Dwelling.	Cape Town, Oranjezicht	The Cape	Provincial Heritage Site	33°56′27″S 18°25′04″E	Upload Photo
9/2/018/0143	161 Long Street, Cape Town			Cape Town		33°55′28″S 18°25′02″E	Upload Photo
9/2/018/0144	Old Fire Station, Strand Street, Cape Town			Cape Town			Upload Photo
9/2/018/0145	25 Montrose Avenue, Oranjezicht, Cape Town			Cape Town		33°56′29″S 18°24′34″E	Upload Photo
9/2/018/0146	Gardens Commercial High School, Paddock Avenue, Gardens, Cape Town	Type of site: School Current use: School.	Cape Town, Gardens	The Cape	Provincial Heritage Site	33°55′48″S 18°24′59″E	Type of site: School Current use: School.
9/2/018/0149	Company Gardens, Cape Town	This garden is situated on the site where commander van Riebeeck originally laid out a garden supply visiting ships with fresh provisions The settlement at the Cape began with a fort and a garden. ""Choose . . . a place for the fort . . . Then choose good soil for the gardens . . . Also plant fruit trees.""These were some of Jan van Riebeeck’s instructions. So he built his Fort of Good Hope Type of site: Botanical Garden. "	Cape Town, Central	The Cape	Provincial Heritage Site	33°55′39″S 18°25′00″E	This garden is situated on the site where commander van Riebeeck originally laid out a garden supply visiting ships with fresh provisions The settlement at the Cape began with a fort and a garden. ""Choose . . . a place for the fort . . . Then choose good soil for the gardens . . . Also plant fruit trees.""These were some of Jan van Riebeeck’s instructions. So he built his Fort of Good Hope Type of site: Botanical Garden. " Media related to Company's Garden at Wikimedia Commons
9/2/018/0150	178-196 Long Street, Cape Town		Cape Town, Central	The Cape	Provisional Protection	33°55′32″S 18°24′57″E	
9/2/018/0151	5-7 Wandel Street, Gardens, Cape Town		Cape Town, Gardens	The Cape	Provincial Heritage Site	33°55′54″S 18°25′02″E	
9/2/018/0152	15 Belvedere Avenue, Oranjezicht, Cape Town	Type of site: House. This imposing dwelling with its late-Victorian features was erected at the turn of the century. It is one of the earliest dwellings to be erected in Belvedere Avenue, which is itself an architecturally important area in the suburb of Oranjezicht.	Cape Town, Oranjezicht	The Cape	Provincial Heritage Site	33°56′22″S 18°24′49″E	Type of site: House. This imposing dwelling with its late-Victorian features was erected at the turn of the century. It is one of the earliest dwellings to be erected in Belvedere Avenue, which is itself an architecturally important area in the suburb of Oranjezicht.
9/2/018/0154	DISTRICT SIX LOCAL AREA, GENERAL			Cape Town			Upload Photo
9/2/018/0158	15 Glynville Terrace, Gardens, Cape Town			Cape Town			Upload Photo
9/2/018/0159	3 Camp Street, Gardens, Cape Town			Cape Town		33°56′04″S 18°24′37″E	Upload Photo
9/2/018/0160	5 Camp Street, Gardens, Cape Town			Cape Town		33°56′04″S 18°24′37″E	Upload Photo
9/2/018/0161	1 Welgemeend Street, Gardens, Cape Town			Cape Town		33°56′04″S 18°24′36″E	Upload Photo
9/2/018/0162	98 Long Street, Cape Town			Cape Town		33°55′21″S 18°25′07″E	Upload Photo
9/2/018/0163	Queens Hotel, Dock Road, Cape Town			Cape Town		33°54′22″S 18°25′08″E	
9/2/018/0165	see 9/2/018/0067/4			Cape Town			Upload Photo
9/2/018/0168	Cape Gallery, 60 Church Street, Cape Town			Cape Town		33°55′20″S 18°25′04″E	Upload Photo
9/2/018/0170	Wagenaers Dam, Golden Acre, Adderley Street, Cape Town			Cape Town			
9/2/018/0175	Old National Mutual Building, 17 Church Square, Cape Town	Architectural style: CAPE REVIVAL. Type of site: Commercial Current use: Office.	Cape Town, Central	The Cape	Provincial Heritage Site	33°55′30″S 18°25′18″E	Architectural style: CAPE REVIVAL. Type of site: Commercial Current use: Office. Media related to Old National Mutual Building, Cape Town at Wikimedia Commons
9/2/018/0176/1	Old Stables, Salibury Street, Cape Town			Cape Town			Upload Photo
9/2/018/0177	Old Slave Lodge, Adderley Street, Cape Town	The Old Supreme Court at the top of the former Heerengracht (now Adderley Street) and adjoining Church Square is a remarkable building. Its history, its architectural merits and its symbolic significance make it unique in South Africa. The proper housing Previous use: Supreme Court, Slave Lodge. Current use: Museum. This building was originally completed in 1680 as the Dutch East India Company's Slave Lodge. It was converted for use as government offices in the 19th century by Thibault (Inspector of Government Buildings), Anreith (sculptor) and Schutte (contractor).	Cape Town, Central	The Cape	Provincial Heritage Site	33°55′30″S 18°25′13″E	The Old Supreme Court at the top of the former Heerengracht (now Adderley Street) and adjoining Church Square is a remarkable building. Its history, its architectural merits and its symbolic significance make it unique in South Africa. The proper housing Previous use: Supreme Court, Slave Lodge. Current use: Museum. This building was originally completed in 1680 as the Dutch East India Company's Slave Lodge. It was converted for use as government offices in the 19th century by Thibault (Inspector of Government Buildings), Anreith (sculptor) and Schutte (contractor). Media related to Old Slave Lodge, Cape Town at Wikimedia Commons
9/2/018/0178	Molteno Reservoir, Gardens, Cape Town			Cape Town		33°56′19″S 18°24′44″E	Upload Photo
9/2/018/0179	Hiddigh Campus, Orange Street, Cape Town			Cape Town		33°55′47″S 18°24′47″E	
9/2/018/0179/001	Egyptian building, Orange Street, Cape Town	Just above Bertram House, also to the right of the Avenue, the so-called "Egyptian Building" of the University of Cape Town is situated. It lies concealed behind the old white wall of the Company’s park for beasts of prey and a beautiful gateway gives acc. This building was completed in 1841 for the South African College, later the University of Cape Town. It is the first building erected for higher education in South Africa and today still serves the same purpose.	Cape Town, Central	The Cape	Provincial Heritage Site	33°55′49″S 18°24′50″E	Just above Bertram House, also to the right of the Avenue, the so-called "Egyptian Building" of the University of Cape Town is situated. It lies concealed behind the old white wall of the Company’s park for beasts of prey and a beautiful gateway gives acc. This building was completed in 1841 for the South African College, later the University of Cape Town. It is the first building erected for higher education in South Africa and today still serves the same purpose. Media related to Egyptian Building (Cape Town) at Wikimedia Commons
9/2/018/0180	IDASA, 6 Spin Street, Cape Town	This predominantly Edwardian building was erected in about 1902 and its design is attributed to Sir Herbert Baker. The building also forms an integral part of Church Square, which is bounded on all four sides by historical buildings. Current use: Commercial.	Cape Town, Central	The Cape	Provincial Heritage Site	33°55′32″S 18°25′17″E	This predominantly Edwardian building was erected in about 1902 and its design is attributed to Sir Herbert Baker. The building also forms an integral part of Church Square, which is bounded on all four sides by historical buildings. Current use: Commercial. Media related to 6 Spin Street, Cape Town at Wikimedia Commons
9/2/018/0181	134-136 Long Street, Cape Town	Architectural style: ART NOUVEAU ELEMENTS. Current use: Commercial.	Cape Town, Central	The Cape	Provincial Heritage Site	33°55′25″S 18°25′03″E	Architectural style: ART NOUVEAU ELEMENTS. Current use: Commercial.
9/2/018/0182	King's blockhouse, Cape Town	After the First British occupation of the Cape in 1795, General J. H. Craig extended the French Line by building three more blockhouses further up Devil’s Peak. They were the Queen’s Blockhouse on the Zonnebloem estate, the Prince of Wales at a height of Type of site: Blockhouse Previous use: Fortification.	Cape Town	The Cape	Provincial Heritage Site	33°57′02″S 18°27′01″E	After the First British occupation of the Cape in 1795, General J. H. Craig extended the French Line by building three more blockhouses further up Devil’s Peak. They were the Queen’s Blockhouse on the Zonnebloem estate, the Prince of Wales at a height of Type of site: Blockhouse Previous use: Fortification. Media related to King's Blockhouse at Wikimedia Commons
9/2/018/0183	Locomotive, Cape Town Station, Cape Town	Here in the midst of Cape Town in the modern railway station building stands a monument which calls our attention for a moment from the romantic past, epitomised in the Castle and Parade, to the realities of the age of the machine : an old railway engine. Type of site: Locomotive.	Cape Town, Central	The Cape	Heritage Object	33°55′20″S 18°25′30″E	Here in the midst of Cape Town in the modern railway station building stands a monument which calls our attention for a moment from the romantic past, epitomised in the Castle and Parade, to the realities of the age of the machine : an old railway engine. Type of site: Locomotive. Media related to CGR ex CTR&D 0-4-2WT at Wikimedia Commons
9/2/018/0184	Good Hope Lodge, Cape Town	De Mist himself described the Lodge as the most beautiful in the world. The strong and bold façade of the building was, and still is, very striking. The interior was indeed impressive. From the entrance hall steps led up to the Temple—a huge hall with a f These buildings were erected in 1804, and are one of the most important examples of the collaboration of Anreith, Thibault and Schutte, the architect, the sculptor and the builder respectively, who exercised a great influence on architecture at the Cape a	Cape Town, Central	The Cape	Provincial Heritage Site	33°55′43″S 18°25′05″E	Upload Photo
9/2/018/0186	South African National Library, Cape Town	The old building of the South African Library was designed by W. H. Kohler in the neo-classical style. The foundation stone was laid by Sir George Grey in 1858 and the building was officially opened by Prince Alfred in 1860. The library was established Type of site: Library.	Cape Town, Central	The Cape	Provincial Heritage Site	33°55′32″S 18°25′07″E	The old building of the South African Library was designed by W. H. Kohler in the neo-classical style. The foundation stone was laid by Sir George Grey in 1858 and the building was officially opened by Prince Alfred in 1860. The library was established Type of site: Library. Media related to National Library of South Africa at Wikimedia Commons
9/2/018/0187	122 Bree Street, Cape Town	This house is one of the few remaining Georgian double-storeyed houses in Cape Town, and is therefore an inalienable part of the city's architectural heritage.	Cape Town, Central	The Cape	Provincial Heritage Site	33°55′20″S 18°25′00″E	This house is one of the few remaining Georgian double-storeyed houses in Cape Town, and is therefore an inalienable part of the city's architectural heritage.
9/2/018/0188	173 Bree Street, Cape Town	Type of site: Commercial Current use: Shop. In its present form this Victorian double-storeyed shop building with its cast-iron balcony dates from the end of the nineteenth century.	Cape Town, Central	The Cape	Provincial Heritage Site	33°55′26″S 18°24′55″E	Type of site: Commercial Current use: Shop. In its present form this Victorian double-storeyed shop building with its cast-iron balcony dates from the end of the nineteenth century.
9/2/018/0189	Jan de Waal House, 93 Bree Street, Cape Town	Jan de Waal House is a double-storey five-bay town house with a shallow rusticated plaster front and finely detailed Georgian teak joinery (c. 1830). It also has an eight panelled entrance door with fanlight, as well as sashes, louvered shutters and a cem This double-storeyed house with its predominantly Georgian characteristics was presumably erected by Jan de Waal shortly after the property was granted to him in 1752 by the Governor Ryk Tulbagh. The present Georgian windows and door replaced those in the Architectural style: GEORGIAN ELEMENTS. Type of site: House Current use: Commercial. The erf of which this Georgian double-storeyed house stands, was granted to Jan de Waal in 1752. The house, which was presumably erected shortly afterwards, received its Georgian character early in the nineteenth century.	Cape Town, Central	The Cape	Provincial Heritage Site	33°55′16″S 18°25′07″E	Jan de Waal House is a double-storey five-bay town house with a shallow rusticated plaster front and finely detailed Georgian teak joinery (c. 1830). It also has an eight panelled entrance door with fanlight, as well as sashes, louvered shutters and a cem This double-storeyed house with its predominantly Georgian characteristics was presumably erected by Jan de Waal shortly after the property was granted to him in 1752 by the Governor Ryk Tulbagh. The present Georgian windows and door replaced those in the Architectural style: GEORGIAN ELEMENTS. Type of site: House Current use: Commercial. The erf of which this Georgian double-storeyed house stands, was granted to Jan de Waal in 1752. The house, which was presumably erected shortly afterwards, received its Georgian character early in the nineteenth century.
9/2/018/0190	Bertram House, Government Avenue, Cape Town	This house clearly expresses the more important features of Georgian architecture. The exterior is undistinguished—a cube-shaped double-storeyed building in which the natural colour of its unplastered and un coloured brick walls is emphasised. It has sash Bertram House, which occupies an important place in the history of South African architecture, is one of several buildings erected within the original confines of the Dutch East India Company’s garden. It is partly hidden by a high wall near the top of th Type of site: House Previous use: Residential. Current use: Museum. Bertram House is probably the only surviving example of the brick houses of the English Georgian style. It was built during the first quarter of the nineteenth century.	Cape Town, Central	The Cape	Provincial Heritage Site	33°55′50″S 18°24′49″E	This house clearly expresses the more important features of Georgian architecture. The exterior is undistinguished—a cube-shaped double-storeyed building in which the natural colour of its unplastered and un coloured brick walls is emphasised. It has sash Bertram House, which occupies an important place in the history of South African architecture, is one of several buildings erected within the original confines of the Dutch East India Company’s garden. It is partly hidden by a high wall near the top of th Type of site: House Previous use: Residential. Current use: Museum. Bertram House is probably the only surviving example of the brick houses of the English Georgian style. It was built during the first quarter of the nineteenth century.
9/2/018/0191	WALMER ESTATE LOCAL AREA, GENERAL			Cape Town			Upload Photo
9/2/018/0192	14 Keerom Street, Cape Town	This typical Cape eighteenth-century town house is situated on land which was originally granted to Hermanus Smuts in 1751 and is an important link with Cape Town's past.	Cape Town, Central	The Cape	Provincial Heritage Site	33°55′28″S 18°25′03″E	Upload Photo
9/2/018/0193	Blue Lodge, 206-208 Long Street, Cape Town	The Blue Lodge Hotel consists of a treble-storeyed building with two balconies and a steep roof with dormer windows, pinnacled gables and a corner turret of exuberant late-victorian design, just before 1900. The balconies have intricate moulded MacFarlane This impressive late Victorian building, which was erected at the turn of the century, forms an integral part of the architectural character of Long Street, a part of Cape Town where a uniformity of character has to a large extent remained. Architectural style: VICTORIAN. Type of site: Commercial. This impressive late Victorian building, which was erected at the turn of the century, forms an integral part of the architectural character of Long Street, a part of Cape Town where a uniformity of character has to a large extent remained.	Cape Town, Central	The Cape	Provincial Heritage Site	33°55′30″S 18°24′59″E	The Blue Lodge Hotel consists of a treble-storeyed building with two balconies and a steep roof with dormer windows, pinnacled gables and a corner turret of exuberant late-victorian design, just before 1900. The balconies have intricate moulded MacFarlane This impressive late Victorian building, which was erected at the turn of the century, forms an integral part of the architectural character of Long Street, a part of Cape Town where a uniformity of character has to a large extent remained. Architectural style: VICTORIAN. Type of site: Commercial. This impressive late Victorian building, which was erected at the turn of the century, forms an integral part of the architectural character of Long Street, a part of Cape Town where a uniformity of character has to a large extent remained.
9/2/018/0194	SA Mission Foundation Museum, 40 Long Street, Cape Town	The Sendinggestig, which is the oldest indigenous mission church in the country, was erected shortly after the establishment of the South African Mission Society in 1799. The building was completed early in 1804 and consecrated on 15 March 1804 by the Rev Type of site: Church Current use: Museum.	Cape Town, Central	The Cape	Provincial Heritage Site	33°55′16″S 18°25′13″E	The Sendinggestig, which is the oldest indigenous mission church in the country, was erected shortly after the establishment of the South African Mission Society in 1799. The building was completed early in 1804 and consecrated on 15 March 1804 by the Rev Type of site: Church Current use: Museum. Media related to Sendinggestig Museum at Wikimedia Commons
9/2/018/0195	Old YWCA Building, 78 Long Street, Cape Town	The YWCA is a triple-storeyed Victorian building with a double-level cast-iron verandah. The main entrance doors are twin four-panelled teak doors. The ground floor has a grey granite surround with chrome trim around large windows. The facade of the build This Victorian building, which was rebuilt in 1903 by J. Parker of the firm Forsyth and Parker and dedicated to the memory of Minnie and Maria, daughters of J. A. Bam who died in Germany, forms an integral part of the architectural character of Long Street Architectural style: VICTORIAN. Type of site: YWCA Current use: Commercial.	Cape Town, Central	The Cape	Provincial Heritage Site	33°55′20″S 18°25′10″E	The YWCA is a triple-storeyed Victorian building with a double-level cast-iron verandah. The main entrance doors are twin four-panelled teak doors. The ground floor has a grey granite surround with chrome trim around large windows. The facade of the build This Victorian building, which was rebuilt in 1903 by J. Parker of the firm Forsyth and Parker and dedicated to the memory of Minnie and Maria, daughters of J. A. Bam who died in Germany, forms an integral part of the architectural character of Long Street Architectural style: VICTORIAN. Type of site: YWCA Current use: Commercial. Media related to Old YWCA Building, Cape Town at Wikimedia Commons
9/2/018/0196	Huguenot Memorial Building, 48 Queen Victoria Street, Cape Town	This predominantly Edwardian building was erected by the Synod of the Dutch Reformed Church to commemorate the arrival of the French Huguenots (1688). The foundation stone was laid on 24 August 1899 and the building was officially opened on 15 October 190 Type of site: Memorial Current use: Institutional.	Cape Town, Central	The Cape	Provincial Heritage Site	33°55′35″S 18°25′01″E	This predominantly Edwardian building was erected by the Synod of the Dutch Reformed Church to commemorate the arrival of the French Huguenots (1688). The foundation stone was laid on 24 August 1899 and the building was officially opened on 15 October 190 Type of site: Memorial Current use: Institutional. Media related to Huguenot Memorial Building, Cape Town at Wikimedia Commons
9/2/018/0197	Martin Melck House, Strand Street, Cape Town	When he built the "warehouse", Martin Melck kept the eventual need for a parsonage in mind and took care to have possession of the land to the east of the church. At a later stage he transferred it to the church and after his death a parsonage was built o	Cape Town, Central	The Cape	Provincial Heritage Site	33°55′09″S 18°25′11″E	When he built the "warehouse", Martin Melck kept the eventual need for a parsonage in mind and took care to have possession of the land to the east of the church. At a later stage he transferred it to the church and after his death a parsonage was built o Media related to Martin Melck House at Wikimedia Commons
9/2/018/0198	Koopmans-de Wet House, 35 Strand Street, Cape Town	Main article: Koopmans-de Wet House The first street in Cape Town was Sea Street, directly opposite Van Riebeeck’s Fort of Good Hope, along the beach to the west of the Heerengracht. This street today is far from the sea. Type of site: House Previous use: House. Current use: Museum.	Cape Town, Central	The Cape	Provincial Heritage Site	33°55′15″S 18°25′17″E	The first street in Cape Town was Sea Street, directly opposite Van Riebeeck’s Fort of Good Hope, along the beach to the west of the Heerengracht. This street today is far from the sea. Type of site: House Previous use: House. Current use: Museum. Media related to Koopmans-de Wet House at Wikimedia Commons
9/2/018/0199	Sexton's House, Strand Street, Cape Town	This building at the corner of Strand and Buitengracht Streets was probably built at the same time as the Parsonage, that is between 1779 and 1783. It was originally separated from the Church by another house which the Church Council let out to tenants, b	Cape Town, Central	The Cape	Provincial Heritage Site	33°55′08″S 18°25′10″E	This building at the corner of Strand and Buitengracht Streets was probably built at the same time as the Parsonage, that is between 1779 and 1783. It was originally separated from the Church by another house which the Church Council let out to tenants, b Media related to Sexton's House, Strand Street at Wikimedia Commons
9/2/018/0200	Zorgwyk, 36 Breda Street, Gardens, Cape Town	This house, which was built predominantly in the Georgian style, was originally the homestead of the loan farm Zorgwyk. The house, which is indicated on a map of 1820, is one of but a few of the homesteads of the early loan farms in the Upper Table Valley Type of site: House Current use: House.	Cape Town, Gardens	The Cape	Provincial Heritage Site	33°56′16″S 18°24′58″E	Upload Photo
9/2/018/0201	3 Faure Street, Gardens, Cape Town	This house, which was erected in the late nineteenth century, consists of a single-storeyed building with bay window and finely decorated cast-iron verandah. The entrance has a single teak door with side and fanlights. The windows are all large-paned sash. This house with its impressive Cast-iron verandah dates from the late nineteenth century. It is an excellent example of late Victorian architecture.	Cape Town, Gardens	The Cape	Provincial Heritage Site	33°55′47″S 18°24′43″E	Upload Photo
9/2/018/0202	7 Glynville Terrace, Gardens, Cape Town	Type of site: Terraced House.	Cape Town, Gardens	The Cape	Provincial Heritage Site	33°55′55″S 18°25′00″E	Type of site: Terraced House.
9/2/018/0203	Ravenswood, Hatfield Street, Gardens, Cape Town	Ravenswood House is the only known example in Cape Town of the late classical Georgian architectural style of the beginning of the 19th century. This double-storeyed building was probably erected between 1817 and 1835 by M. A. de Kock as one of a series o Type of site: House.	Cape Town, Gardens	The Cape	Provincial Heritage Site	33°55′55″S 18°24′55″E	Ravenswood House is the only known example in Cape Town of the late classical Georgian architectural style of the beginning of the 19th century. This double-storeyed building was probably erected between 1817 and 1835 by M. A. de Kock as one of a series o Type of site: House. Media related to Ravenswood House at Wikimedia Commons
9/2/018/0204	Waterhof, 56 Hof Street, Gardens, Cape Town	"Waterhof" was originally a part of Leeuwenhof, but became a separate property in 1782. The house was probably built in 1785 or 1786 and is one of the historic 18th-century houses on the slopes of Table Mountain. Just below Leeuwenhof, on the opposite s Type of site: House. "Waterhof" was originally a part of Leeuwenhof, but became a separate property in 1782. The house was probably built in 1785 or 1786 and is one of the historic 18th-century houses on the slopes of Table Mountain.	Cape Town, Gardens	The Cape	Provincial Heritage Site	33°56′14″S 18°24′28″E	Upload Photo
9/2/018/0205	Anrieth pediment, Glaston House, 127-139 Bree Street, Cape Town	As the town developed in the direction of Signal Hill at the end of the eighteenth century, the smart residential area of the rich merchants began to expand from Sea Street (Strand Street) towards Bree Street. Only a few stately eighteenth century double- . In the cornice and pediment there is a sculpture designed by well-known Cape architect Anton Anreith. It is the only example left of such embossment on a building in Cape Town, of which there were formerly at least twenty.	Cape Town, Central	The Cape	Heritage Object	33°55′11″S 18°24′38″E	As the town developed in the direction of Signal Hill at the end of the eighteenth century, the smart residential area of the rich merchants began to expand from Sea Street (Strand Street) towards Bree Street. Only a few stately eighteenth century double- . In the cornice and pediment there is a sculpture designed by well-known Cape architect Anton Anreith. It is the only example left of such embossment on a building in Cape Town, of which there were formerly at least twenty.
9/2/018/0207	7 Union Street, Gardens, Cape Town	This is an impressive late nineteenth-century house surrounded by a low masonry wall, with cast-iron infill. There are two bay windows on a projecting bay and the other a corner bay beneath the turret. There is a verandah running two lengths of the building. This impressive house, with its unusual hexagonal turret that surmounts the front verandah, was presumably erected in 1895. Its magnificent marble fireplaces are an exceptional feature.	Cape Town, Gardens	The Cape	Provincial Heritage Site	33°56′00″S 18°24′38″E	This is an impressive late nineteenth-century house surrounded by a low masonry wall, with cast-iron infill. There are two bay windows on a projecting bay and the other a corner bay beneath the turret. There is a verandah running two lengths of the building. This impressive house, with its unusual hexagonal turret that surmounts the front verandah, was presumably erected in 1895. Its magnificent marble fireplaces are an exceptional feature.
9/2/018/0208	5 Upper Union Street, Gardens, Cape Town	Type of site: House Previous use: Residential. Current use: Commercial.	Cape Town, Gardens	The Cape	Provincial Heritage Site	33°55′55″S 18°24′30″E	Upload Photo
9/2/018/0209	Somerset Hospital, Green Point, Cape Town	East wing added in 1891. Verandahs added 1897 Queen's Jubilee The "New Somerset Hospital" was opened in 1862. It was the first hospital where doctors were trained in South Africa and played an important part in the history of Hospitals. Type of site: Hospital.	Cape Town, Green Point	The Cape	Provincial Heritage Site	33°54′16″S 18°25′01″E	East wing added in 1891. Verandahs added 1897 Queen's Jubilee The "New Somerset Hospital" was opened in 1862. It was the first hospital where doctors were trained in South Africa and played an important part in the history of Hospitals. Type of site: Hospital. Media related to Somerset Hospital, Cape Town at Wikimedia Commons
9/2/018/0210	De Goede Verwachting, 17 Cavalcade Road, Green Point, Cape Town	De Goede Verwachting, which bears the date 1815 on its moulded front, is a building in the Georgian neo classical style. It stands in Cavalcade Road, Green Point, which is reached from York Road which turns sharply off the main road in a southerly direction. A fine example of an early nineteenth-century house at the Cape. It bears the date 1815 and is an example of a Georgian house in the neo-classicistic style of building.	Cape Town, Green Point	The Cape	Provincial Heritage Site	33°54′35″S 18°24′33″E	Upload Photo
9/2/018/0214	San Remo, Camp Street, Gardens, Cape Town			Cape Town			Upload Photo
9/2/018/0215	105 Hatfield Street, Gardens, Cape Town			Cape Town		33°55′52″S 18°24′58″E	Upload Photo
9/2/018/0216	Chimney, 9 Bree Street, Cape Town			Cape Town		33°55′04″S 18°25′20″E	Upload Photo
9/2/018/0217	Van Breda memorial and graves, 8 Montrose Avenue, Oranjezicht, Cape		Cape Town, Oranjezicht	Cape Town		33°56′28″S 18°24′47″E	Upload Photo
9/2/018/0219	Hurling Pump, Prince Street, Cape Town	The old pump-house at the corner of Prince and Sir George Grey Streets is a completely different kind of structure from the stately houses at the foot of Table Mountain. From the seventeenth century onwards water for domestic purposes was carried by slave Type of site: Pump.	Cape Town, Oranjezicht	The Cape	Provincial Heritage Site	33°56′17″S 18°24′56″E	The old pump-house at the corner of Prince and Sir George Grey Streets is a completely different kind of structure from the stately houses at the foot of Table Mountain. From the seventeenth century onwards water for domestic purposes was carried by slave Type of site: Pump. Media related to The Hurling pump at Wikimedia Commons
9/2/018/0220	7 Belvedere Avenue, Oranjezicht, Cape Town		Cape Town, Oranjezicht	The Cape	Provincial Heritage Site	33°56′23″S 18°24′53″E	
9/2/018/0222	21 Belvedere Avenue, Oranjezicht, Cape Town	Type of site: House. This impressive double-storeyed manor-house, which was erected shortly after the turn of the century, is an excellent example of Edwardian architecture, and has neo classical and Victorian features.	Cape Town, Oranjezicht	The Cape	Provincial Heritage Site	33°56′22″S 18°24′46″E	Type of site: House. This impressive double-storeyed manor-house, which was erected shortly after the turn of the century, is an excellent example of Edwardian architecture, and has neo classical and Victorian features.
9/2/018/0223	23 Belvedere Avenue, Oranjezicht, Cape Town		Cape Town, Oranjezicht	The Cape	Provincial Heritage Site	33°56′22″S 18°24′45″E	
9/2/018/0224	Villa Catharina, 1 Rosebank Place, Oranjezicht, Cape Town	This double-storey Victorian house is at the end of a row of attached town houses. It has an asbestos cement slate roof with a tall chimney and double-storey triangular bay window. The gable extends out over the barge decoration the cast-iron vent. The do Type of site: House. This beautiful Victorian row house, which dates from the late nineteenth century, is an excellent and well-preserved example of its kind. The front facade is particularly good, with excellent detailing. The decorative barge ornamentation and orpate cast i	Cape Town, Oranjezicht	The Cape	Provincial Heritage Site	33°56′14″S 18°24′52″E	This double-storey Victorian house is at the end of a row of attached town houses. It has an asbestos cement slate roof with a tall chimney and double-storey triangular bay window. The gable extends out over the barge decoration the cast-iron vent. The do Type of site: House. This beautiful Victorian row house, which dates from the late nineteenth century, is an excellent and well-preserved example of its kind. The front facade is particularly good, with excellent detailing. The decorative barge ornamentation and orpate cast i
9/2/018/0225	Muritai, 22 Rosemount Avenue, Oranjezicht, Cape Town	Type of site: House.	Cape Town, Oranjezicht	The Cape	Provincial Heritage Site	33°56′25″S 18°24′54″E	Type of site: House.
9/2/018/0231	St Cyprians School, Belmonth Avenue, Oranjezicht, Cape Town			Cape Town		33°56′32″S 18°25′02″E	Media related to St Cyprian's School at Wikimedia Commons
9/2/018/0231/001	Gateway and walls, St Cyprian's School, Belmont Avenue, Oranjezicht, Cape Town	This gateway and these walls date from the end of the 18th century and are situated on a portion of the historic Nooitgedacht property. Because of the impressive architectural style of the gateway and walls it is often stated that they were designed by Lo Type of site: Gateway.	Cape Town, Oranjezicht	The Cape	Provincial Heritage Site	33°56′27″S 18°25′01″E	This gateway and these walls date from the end of the 18th century and are situated on a portion of the historic Nooitgedacht property. Because of the impressive architectural style of the gateway and walls it is often stated that they were designed by Lo Type of site: Gateway. Media related to St Cyprian's School at Wikimedia Commons
9/2/018/0234	Houses of Parliament, Parliament Street, Cape Town	Main article: Houses of Parliament, Cape Town The Garden and Avenue are of such an age that even buildings that must be regarded as encroaching on them have achieved historical importance. The Houses of Parliament at the lower end of the Avenue were completed in 1885. The building was to serve for tw Architectural style: NEO CLASSICAL ELEMENTS. Type of site: Government Current use: Parliament.	Cape Town, Central	The Cape	National Heritage Site	33°55′32″S 18°25′10″E	The Garden and Avenue are of such an age that even buildings that must be regarded as encroaching on them have achieved historical importance. The Houses of Parliament at the lower end of the Avenue were completed in 1885. The building was to serve for tw Architectural style: NEO CLASSICAL ELEMENTS. Type of site: Government Current use: Parliament. Media related to Houses of Parliament, Cape Town at Wikimedia Commons
9/2/018/0235	Tuynhuys, Stalplein, Cape Town	Architectural style: CAPE DUTCH. Type of site: Government House Current use: Residential.	Cape Town, Central	The Cape	Provincial Heritage Site	33°55′38″S 18°25′07″E	Architectural style: CAPE DUTCH. Type of site: Government House Current use: Residential. Media related to Tuynhuys at Wikimedia Commons
9/2/018/0236	St. Mary's Cathedral, Roeland Street, Cape Town			Cape Town		33°55′42″S 18°25′10″E	
9/2/018/0237	46-56 Barnet Street, Gardens, Cape Town			Cape Town		33°55′52″S 18°25′00″E	Upload Photo
9/2/018/0237/001	46 Barnet Street, Gardens, Cape Town	These three double-storeyed houses form an integral part of a row of six similar late-nineteenth-century terraced houses with Georgian and Victorian features. These three double-storeyed houses form an integral part of a row of six similar late-nineteenth-century terraced houses with Georgian and Victorian features.	Cape Town, Gardens	The Cape	Provincial Heritage Site	33°55′52″S 18°25′00″E	Upload Photo
9/2/018/0237/002	48 Barnet Street, Gardens, Cape Town	These three double-storeyed houses form an integral part of a row of six similar late-nineteenth-century terraced houses with Georgian and Victorian features. These three double-storeyed houses form an integral part of a row of six similar late-nineteenth-century terraced houses with Georgian and Victorian features.	Cape Town, Gardens	The Cape	Provincial Heritage Site	33°55′52″S 18°25′00″E	Upload Photo
9/2/018/0237/006	56 Barnet Street, Gardens, Cape Town	These three double-storeyed houses form an integral part of a row of six similar late-nineteenth-century terraced houses with Georgian and Victorian features.	Cape Town, Gardens	The Cape	Provincial Heritage Site	33°55′53″S 18°25′00″E	Upload Photo
9/2/018/0237/3	50 Barnet Street, Gardens, Cape Town			Cape Town		33°55′52″S 18°25′00″E	Upload Photo
9/2/018/0237/4	52 Barnet Street, Gardens, Cape Town			Cape Town		33°55′53″S 18°25′00″E	Upload Photo
9/2/018/0237/5	54 Barnet Street, Gardens, Cape Town			Cape Town		33°55′53″S 18°25′00″E	Upload Photo
9/2/018/0239	Old Mutual Building, Darling Street, Cape Town			Cape Town		33°55′27″S 18°25′21″E	Upload Photo
9/2/018/0240	ORANJEZICHT, GENERAL			Cape Town			Upload Photo
9/2/018/0242	Government Avenue, Cape Town	The Government Avenue which even today gives its own particular character to the Gardens and, indeed, to Cape Town, was mentioned as early as 1685 by Chavalier de Chaumont : "The main walk, which is fourteen hundred and fifty paces (about I 305 metres) lo Type of site: Avenue.	Cape Town, Central	The Cape	Provincial Heritage Site	33°55′37″S 18°25′05″E	The Government Avenue which even today gives its own particular character to the Gardens and, indeed, to Cape Town, was mentioned as early as 1685 by Chavalier de Chaumont : "The main walk, which is fourteen hundred and fifty paces (about I 305 metres) lo Type of site: Avenue.
9/2/018/0242/001	Western Gateway (Lioness gate), Government Avenue, Cape Town	The walls and gates are part of the improvements made in the avenue by the well-known architect Thibault in 1803-1804 at the instance of Governor Janssens. The lionesses at the western gate is the work of Anreith. This gate is therefore an example of the co-operation between these famous artists. The lionesses on the western gateway (Signal Hill side) are still the original sculptures of Anreith. In the course of years the lionesses on the western gateway were damaged, but they were restored at the request of the Commission. Type of site: Gateway.	Cape Town, Central	The Cape	Provincial Heritage Site	33°55′49″S 18°24′51″E	The walls and gates are part of the improvements made in the avenue by the well-known architect Thibault in 1803-1804 at the instance of Governor Janssens. The lionesses at the western gate is the work of Anreith. This gate is therefore an example of the co-operation between these famous artists. The lionesses on the western gateway (Signal Hill side) are still the original sculptures of Anreith. In the course of years the lionesses on the western gateway were damaged, but they were restored at the request of the Commission. Type of site: Gateway.
9/2/018/0242/002	Eastern Gateway (Lion gate), Government Avenue, Cape Town	The walls and gates are part of the improvements made in the avenue by the well-known architect Thibault in 1803-1804 at the instance of Governor Janssens. The original lions on this gate, the work of Anreith, were removed in the 19th century, and replaced in the 1950s with the modern lion sculptures of Ivan Mitford-Barberton. Type of site: Gateway.	Cape Town, Central	The Cape	Provincial Heritage Site	33°55′49″S 18°24′52″E	The walls and gates are part of the improvements made in the avenue by the well-known architect Thibault in 1803-1804 at the instance of Governor Janssens. The original lions on this gate, the work of Anreith, were removed in the 19th century, and replaced in the 1950s with the modern lion sculptures of Ivan Mitford-Barberton. Type of site: Gateway.
9/2/018/0243	Conservation areas, Cape Town			Cape Town			Upload Photo
9/2/018/0243/1	Conservation areas, Central Cape Town			Cape Town			Upload Photo
9/2/018/0244	Old Gaol, Roeland Street, Cape Town	Type of site: Gaol Previous use: Prison. Current use: Archives.	Cape Town, Central	The Cape	Provincial Heritage Site	33°55′54″S 18°25′26″E	Type of site: Gaol Previous use: Prison. Current use: Archives. Media related to Western Cape Archives and Records Service at Wikimedia Commons
9/2/018/0246	Preserverance Tavern, 83 Buitenkant Street, Cape Town			Cape Town		33°55′50″S 18°25′15″E	
9/2/018/0247	Stemmets Building, 48 Corporation Street, Cape Town			Cape Town		33°55′33″S 18°25′21″E	Upload Photo
9/2/018/0248	see 9/2/018/0022			Cape Town			Upload Photo
9/2/018/0249	Admiralty Oar, SA Cultural History Museum, Cape Town	The symbolic Vice-Admiralty oar of the Cape of Good Hope is a rare George III oar, with cylindrical shaft, two moulded knobs, larger detachable terminal button and flat blade. It is engraved with the Royal Arms, the eagle and thunderbolt of Zeus, the foul	Cape Town, Central	The Cape	Heritage Object	33°55′21″S 18°25′21″E	The symbolic Vice-Admiralty oar of the Cape of Good Hope is a rare George III oar, with cylindrical shaft, two moulded knobs, larger detachable terminal button and flat blade. It is engraved with the Royal Arms, the eagle and thunderbolt of Zeus, the foul
9/2/018/0250	Old Vredehoek Synagogue, 16 Vredehoek Avenue, Vredehoek, Cape Town			Cape Town		33°56′13″S 18°25′09″E	
9/2/018/0253	256 Buitengracht Street, Cape Town			Cape Town		33°55′38″S 18°24′39″E	Upload Photo
9/2/018/0258	T Gibson Building, 34 Long Street, Cape Town	The T Gibson building in Long street, Cape Town is a two-storey building with a unique terracotta hard burnt clay finish. Designed by architect Anthony M de Witt, this building was originally occupied by Sellers Gents Outfitters, and later it became an art gallery. Current use: Commercial.	Cape Town, Central	The Cape	Provisional Protection	33°55′15″S 18°25′15″E	The T Gibson building in Long street, Cape Town is a two-storey building with a unique terracotta hard burnt clay finish. Designed by architect Anthony M de Witt, this building was originally occupied by Sellers Gents Outfitters, and later it became an art gallery. Current use: Commercial. Media related to T Gibson Building at Wikimedia Commons
9/2/018/0262	Block bounded by Ebenezer, Prestwitch, Liddle & Somerset Roads			Cape Town			Upload Photo
9/2/018/0263	Miniature Ship Models, S A Maritime Museum, V & A Waterfront, Cape			Cape Town		33°54′25″S 18°25′21″E	Upload Photo
9/2/018/0268	47 De Villiers Street, Cape Town			Cape Town			Upload Photo
9/2/018/0271	The Town Fountains and remains of Oranjezicht Estate, Oranjezicht, Cape Town		Cape Town, Oranjezicht	The Cape	Provincial Heritage Site	33°56′31″S 18°24′52″E	
9/2/018/0274	Hanover Street, District Six, Cape Town			Cape Town		33°55′41″S 18°25′41″E	Upload Photo
9/2/018/0275	Terrace Houses, Osborne and Francis Streets, District Six, Cape Town	Type of site: Terrace.	Cape Town, District Six	The Cape	Provincial Heritage Site	33°55′42″S 18°26′22″E	Upload Photo
9/2/018/0282	Block Bounded By Darling, Plein, Castle and Parliament Streets, CAPE TOWN,			Cape Town			Upload Photo
9/2/018/0285	Lion Battery, Military Road, Cape Town			Cape Town			
9/2/018/0289	GARDENS LOCAL AREA, GENERAL			Cape Town			Upload Photo
9/2/018/0291	FRESNAYE LOCAL			Cape Town			Upload Photo
9/2/018/0293	Standard Bank Building, Adderley Street			Cape Town		33°55′24″S 18°25′19″E	Media related to Category:Old Standard Bank Building, Adderley Street at Wikimedia Commons
9/2/018/0297	Culembourg Site, Cape Town			Cape Town			Upload Photo
9/2/018/0301	"Rosmead", 29 Rosmead Avenue, Oranjezicht			Cape Town		33°56′24″S 18°24′28″E	Upload Photo
9/2/018/0302	Congregational Church, Harrington Street, Cape Town			Cape Town		33°55′45″S 18°25′22″E	Upload Photo
9/2/018/0303	FORESHORE LOCAL AREA, GENERAL			Cape Town			Upload Photo
9/2/018/0317	Van Plettenberg Beacon, SA Cultural History Museum, Cape Town	The beacon is two metres high and consists of two fiat, blue slate slabs, about 30 centimetres wide, 13 cm thick and bolted with lead. On 6 November 1778, Governor Joachim Baron van Plettenberg and his party, after an extensive journey which took them as far as the present Colesberg, arrived at this bay at which the Keurbooms and Piesangs Rivers flow into the sea and now renamed it, o Type of site: Beacon.	Cape Town	The Cape	Heritage Object		The beacon is two metres high and consists of two fiat, blue slate slabs, about 30 centimetres wide, 13 cm thick and bolted with lead. On 6 November 1778, Governor Joachim Baron van Plettenberg and his party, after an extensive journey which took them as far as the present Colesberg, arrived at this bay at which the Keurbooms and Piesangs Rivers flow into the sea and now renamed it, o Type of site: Beacon.
HM\CAPE TOWN METRO\CAPE TOWN CBD \ST GEORGE'S CATHEDRAL	St George's Cathedral	Main article: St. George's Cathedral, Cape Town	Cape Town, Central	The Cape	Provincial Heritage Site		Media related to St. George's Cathedral, Cape Town at Wikimedia Commons
HM\CAPE TOWN METRO\DISTRICT SIX \HAROLD CRESSY HIGH SCHOOL	Harold Cressy High School	Main article: Harold Cressy High School	Cape Town, District Six	The Cape	National Heritage Site		Media related to Harold Cressy High School at Wikimedia Commons
