= Standard Bank Building (Cape Town) =

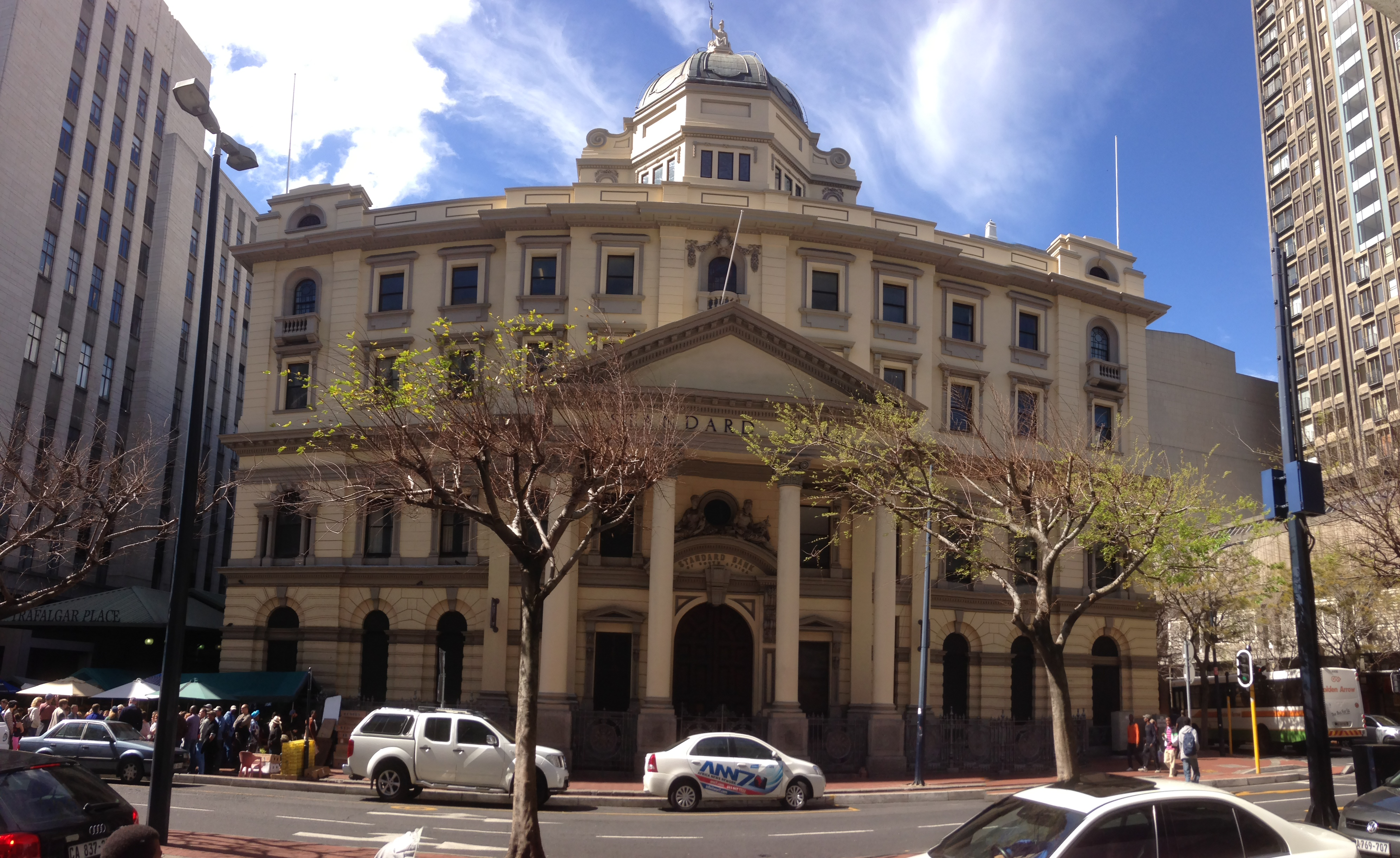
- The Standard Bank Building in 2013
- Click on the map for a fullscreen view

General information
- Location: Adderley Street, Cape Town, South Africa
- Coordinates: 33°55′24.2″S 18°25′19.89″E

The Standard Bank Building is a commercial building located in Cape Town, South Africa.

== History ==
The building, designed by architect Charles Freeman, was constructed to later become the headquarters of the Standard Bank of South Africa. The plot on which it stands was granted to the bank on a 99-year lease at an annual rent of £150 by the city in 1874. The plans were completed in 1881, and construction work, entrusted to T. J. C. Ingelsby at a cost of £27,800, were completed with its official inauguration on March 19, 1893. Originally, the building had only two floors, but in 1922, two additional floors were added and the roof and dome rebuilt.

== Description ==
The building, in neoclassical style, features a colonnaded entrance and a dome topped by a statue of Britannia, while the sculpted heads above the entrance depict Ceres, goddess of agriculture, and Neptune, god of the sea and commerce.

== See also ==
- List of heritage sites in Cape Town CBD and the Waterfront
