= C. H. Pearne Building =

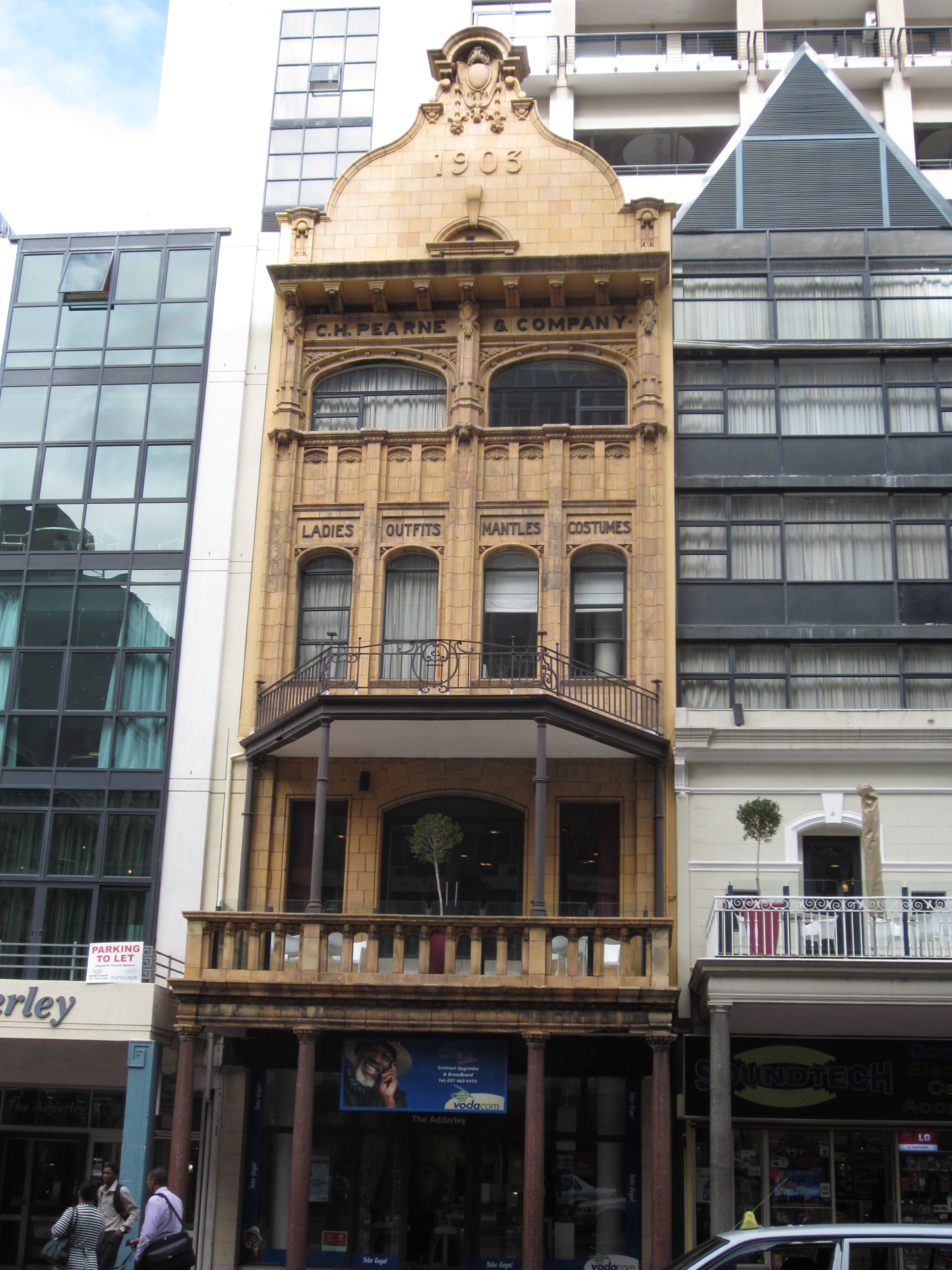
- C. H. Pearne Building in Cape Town
- Click on the map for a fullscreen view

General information
- Location: Cape Town, South Africa
- Coordinates: 33°55′27.05″S 18°25′16.33″E

The C. H. Pearne Building is a commercial building situated in Cape Town, South Africa.

== History ==
The building, built in 1903, was designed by architects D. MacGilliveray e W. H. Grant.

== Description ==
The building is located at 25 Adderley Street in Cape Town's City Bowl. It currently forms part, together with the nearby buildings, of a single mixed-use complex, The Adderley.

== See also ==
- List of heritage sites in Cape Town CBD and the Waterfront
