= Bertram House =

Building in South Africa

Coordinates: 33°55′50″S 18°24′49″E

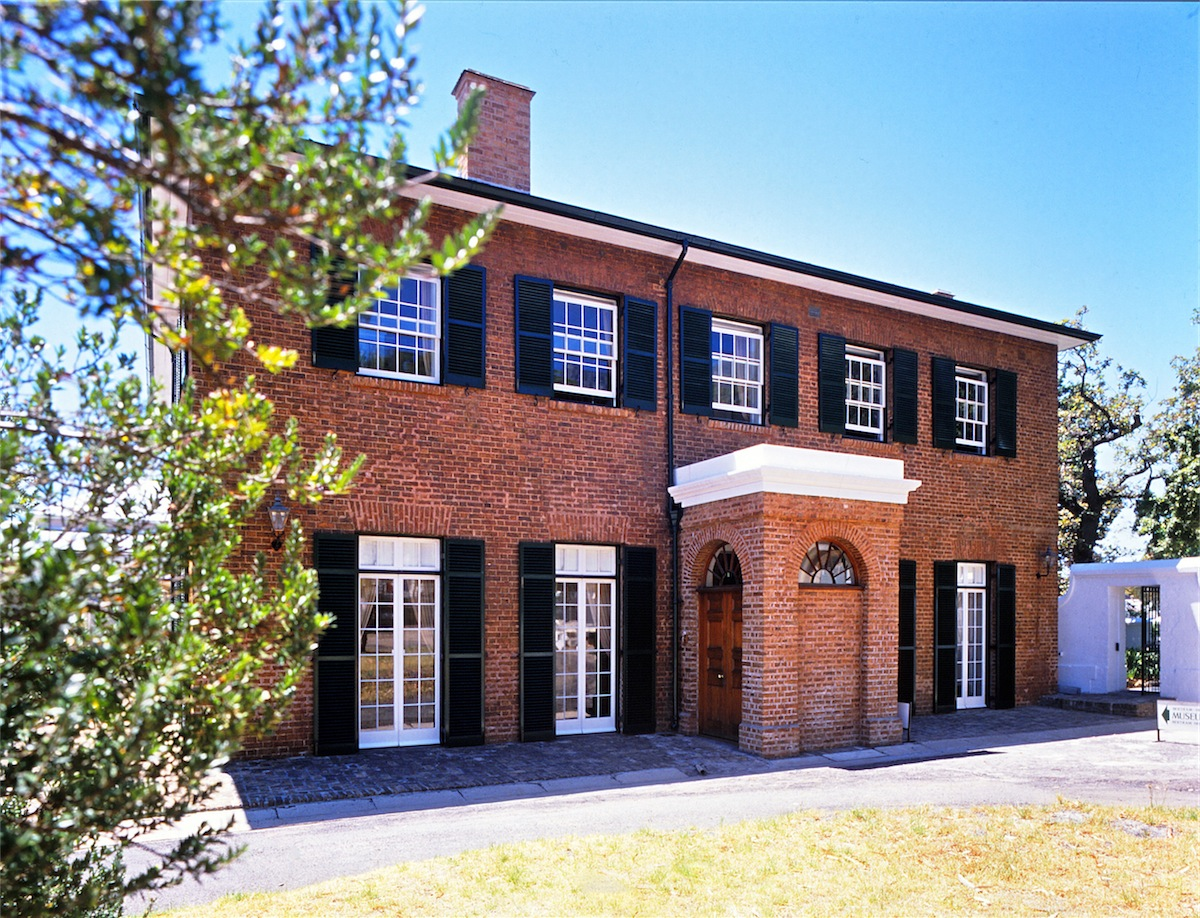
The Bertram House.

The Bertram House (Afrikaans: Bertram Huis), located on Hiddingh Campus, of the University of Cape Town on Government Avenue, in Gardens, is the only surviving unpainted red brick two-story house left from early Georgian architecture in the city. The house has a special place in the history of the South African architecture. In 1962, it was declared a national monument, and today remains a provincial heritage site in accordance with the National Heritage Resources Act (25/1999).

In 1839, John Barker, an attorney who had emigrated from Yorkshire to Cape Colony in 1823, purchased the land. He built his family home there from 1839 to 1854 and named it after his wife, Ann Bertram Findlay, who had died in 1838. After the house passed through several families, the University of Cape Town used it for offices from 1903 onward. In 1930, the building became state property, and in 1976, it was placed at the disposal of the South African Cultural History Museum.

In 1983 and 1984, the building was thoroughly restored. Ornamental bricks were introduced and slate was imported from Wales to bring the facade to its original glory. At the same time, the interior was repainted in the original dark green and ocher. The lobby is decorated in the Regency style. Since then, it has operated as a museum.

The museum is the home of the Anne Lidderdale Collection, which includes Georgian furniture and English and Chinese porcelain donated by some of the leading English families of the early 19th-century Cape.

Nowadays, beadwork and postage stamps are exhibited, and the building is known for book launches and music concerts.

== Sources ==
- Oberholster, J.J.. Die historiese monumente van Suid-Afrika. Cape Town: Die Kultuurstigting Rembrandt van Rijn vir Die Raad vir Nasionale Gedenkwaardighede, 1972. ISBN 0-620-00191-7.
