= Duiker Island =

Small island seal colony off Hout Bay, South Africa

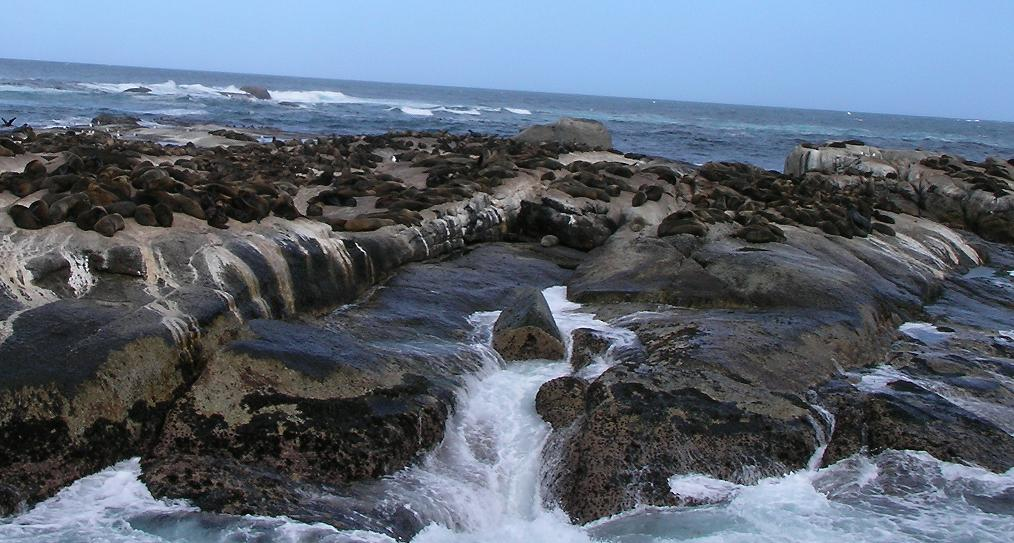
- Fur seals on Duiker Island

- Location within Western Cape

Geography
- Coordinates: chart 34°03′31″S 18°19′37″E
- Area: 0.4 ha (0.99 acres)
- Length: 77 m (253 ft)
- Width: 95 m (312 ft)

Administration
- South Africa
- Province: Western Cape
- Municipality: City of Cape Town

Duiker Island or Duikereiland (Afrikaans), also known as Seal Island (not to be confused with the nearby Seal Island), is an island off Hout Bay near Cape Town South Africa. It is 77 by 95 metres in size, with an area of about 0.4 hectare.

The island is renowned for its marine wildlife, including the Cape fur seals and marine bird species such as the common cormorants and kelp gulls. It is visited regularly by tourists and photographers by boat via Mariner's Wharf in Hout Bay harbour.

On 13 October 2012, a small vessel carrying tourists to Duiker Island capsized. The incident resulted in the deaths of two men while three women survived by finding air pockets beneath the up-turned vessel.

== Gallery ==
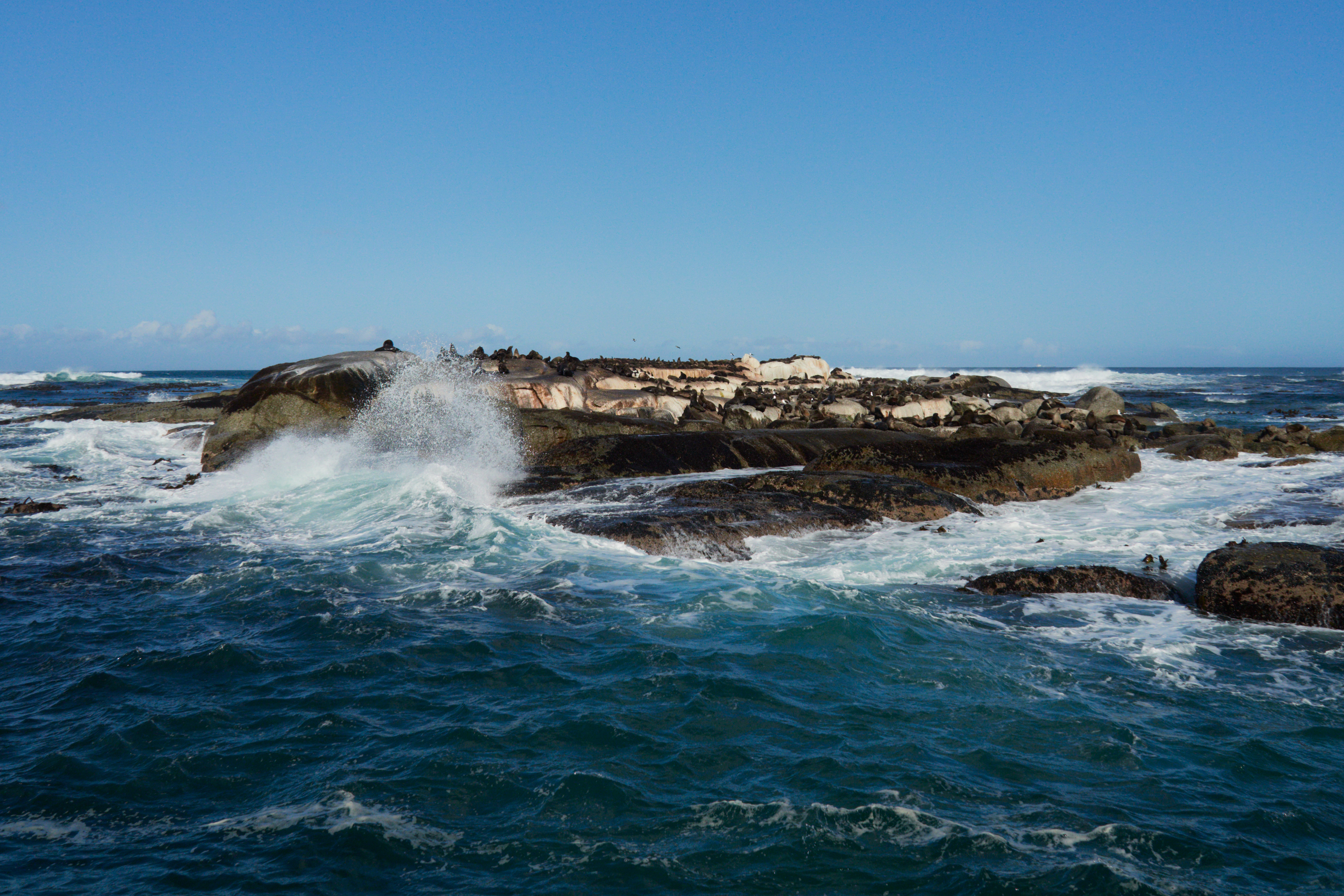
Duiker Island, surrounded by breaking surf.

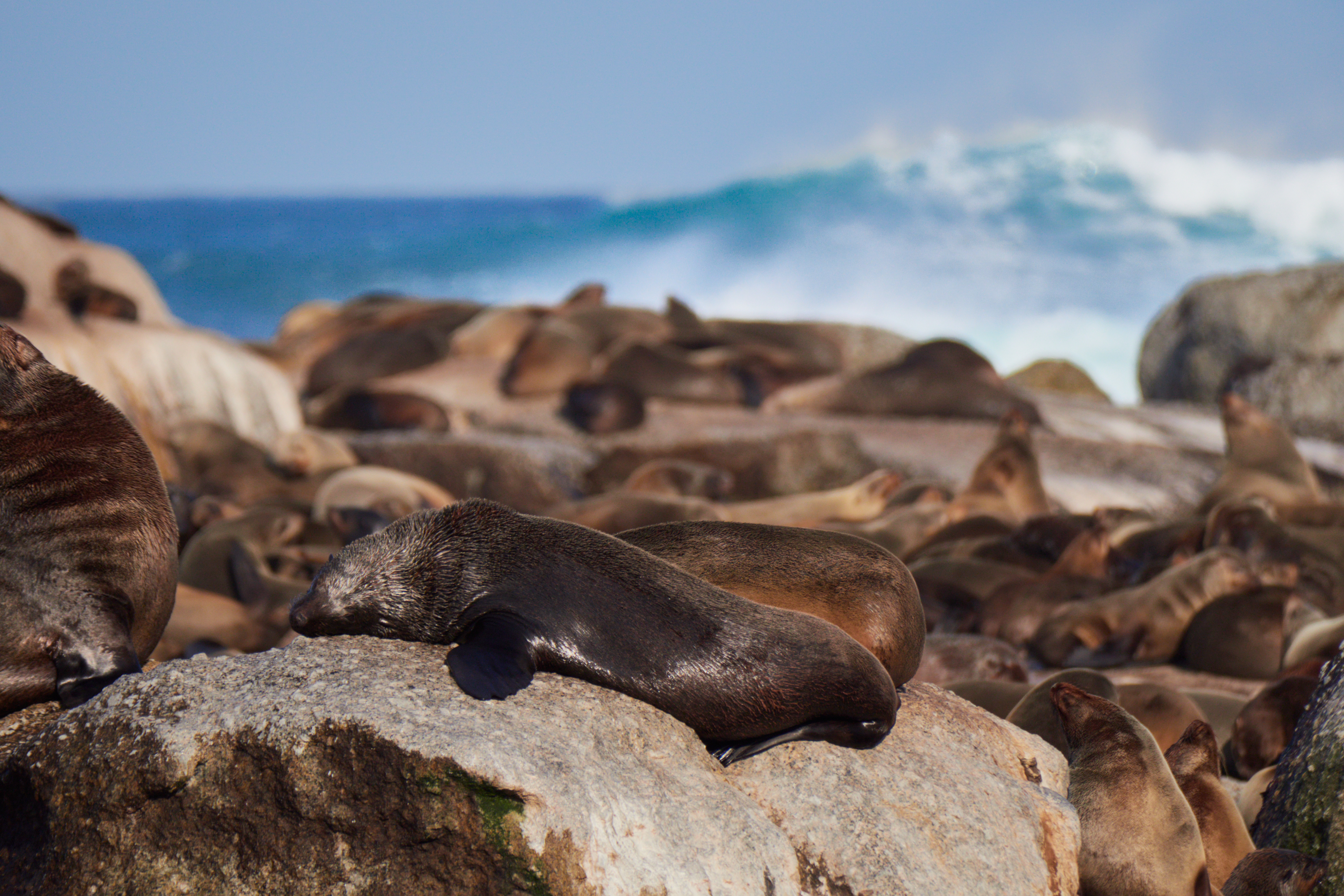
A colony of Cape fur seals (Arctocephalus pusillus) resting on rocks at Duiker Island, with ocean waves in the background.

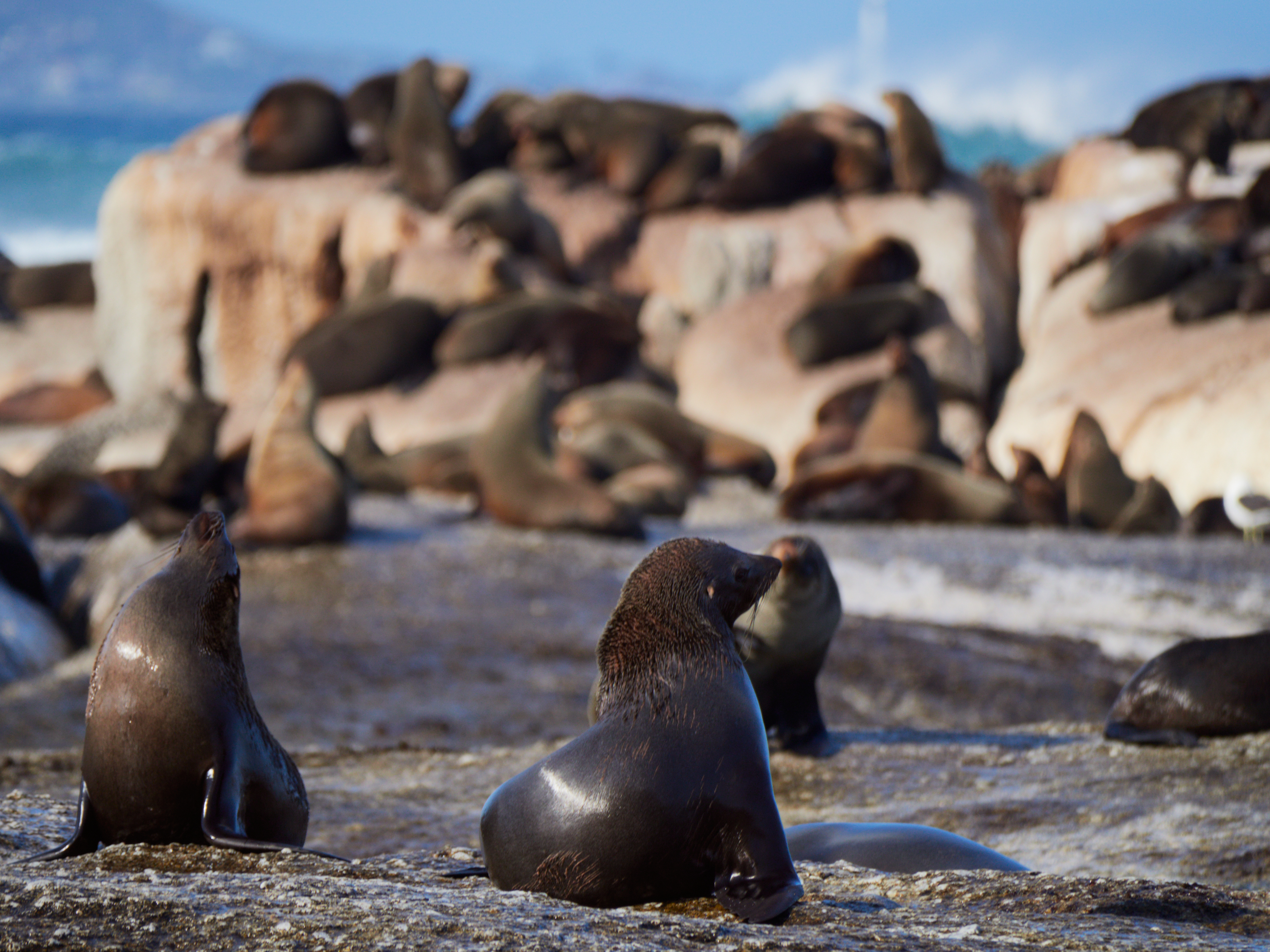
A colony of Cape fur seals (Arctocephalus pusillus) hauled out on the rocks of Duiker Island.

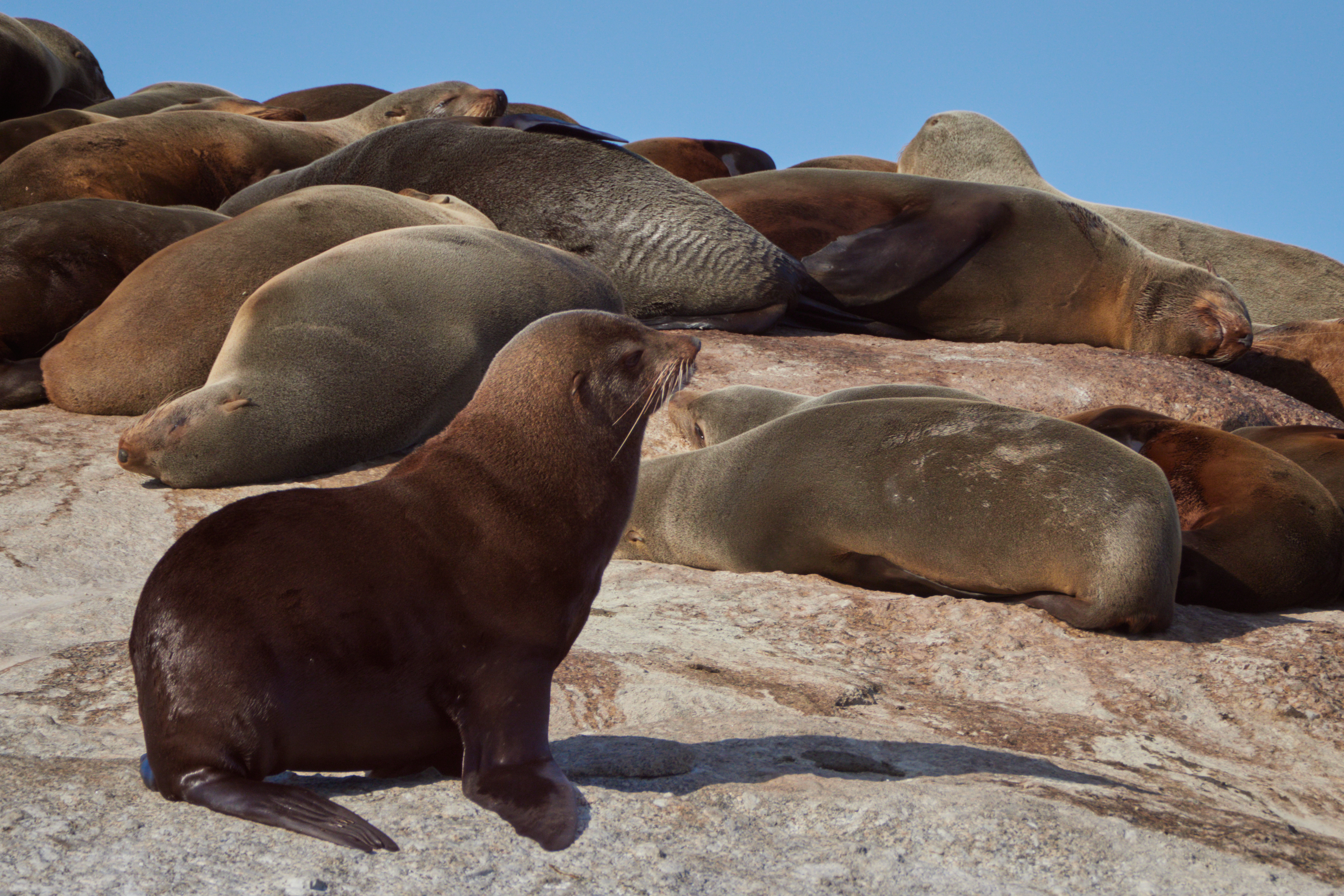
Duiker Island, with one younger Cape fur seal in the foreground.
