= Mariner's Wharf =

Building in the harbour of Hout Bay, Cape Town, South Africa

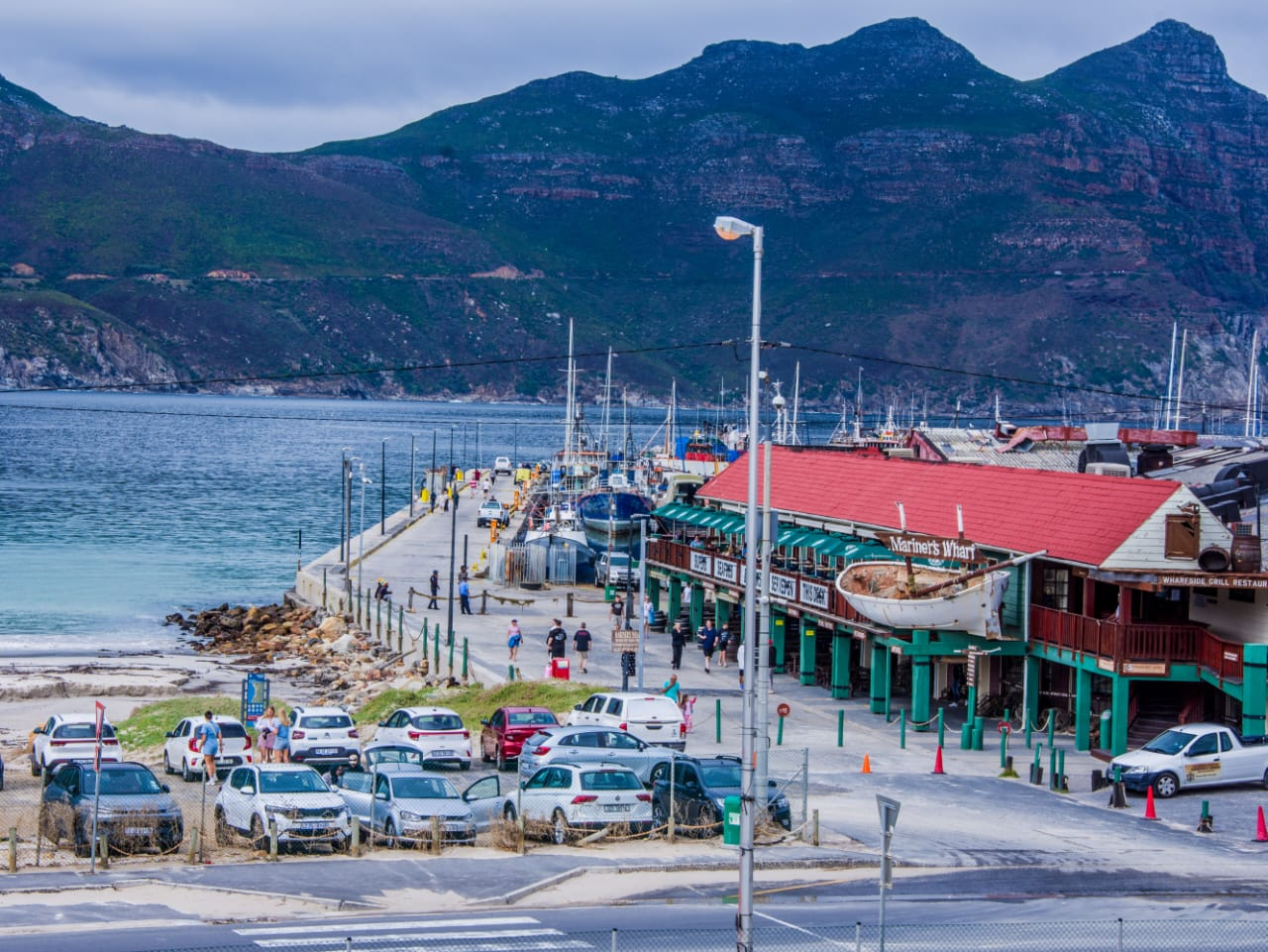
Mariner's Wharf Harbourfront Emporium

Mariner's Wharf is a prominent landmark and attraction in Hout Bay, South Africa. Situated between the beach and harbour entrance, it was built in 1979 by Stanley Dorman, its Managing Director, for his fishing operations. Following a serious decline in the fishing industry during the 1980s he decided to repurpose the building, converting it into Africa’s first harbourfront emporium. Initially comprising a fresh fish market, take-away bistro, sea-shanty restaurant and small shop specialising in seashells and souvenirs.

== History ==
=== Chapman’s Peak Fisheries ===
Stanley Dorman was born and grew up in Hout Bay, starting his career in 1963 with four fishing boats inherited from his uncle Alfred. Prior thereto his forefathers had immigrated to the Cape during the 1890s, farming in and fishing out of Hout Bay until the 1950s. In 1963 Stanley took over what had deteriorated into a moribund business called Chapman’s Peak Fisheries – developing it and other projects into what was to become the Cape Coast Group of Companies.

Besides property acquisitions and building shopping centres, after overcoming financial restraints and officialdom’s red tape, during the ensuing 40 years, Stanley expanded his interests into owning and operating a large fleet of trawlers and lobster catchers, a seafood factory, smokeries, workshops, cold storages and national distribution depots. Contingent thereto, Stanley frequently traveled the world, including several visits to the U.S.A. inter alia being inspired by Fisherman’s Wharf in San Francisco - which encouraged him to create something similar in Hout Bay, evolving into the precursor of Mariner’s Wharf.

=== Mariner’s Wharf harbour front emporium ===
Mariner’s Wharf and its fishmarket (built around the hull of the historic trawler, Kingfisher) was officially opened on 22 November 1984 by South Africa’s Minister of Tourism and Fisheries, becoming Africa’s first harbourfront emporium.

Showcasing fish (fresh and frozen) plus a vast array of products such as smoked snoek, tuna, lobsters, oysters and mussels, the sale of seaside gifts and maritime-related antiques and souvenirs complemented Mariner’s Wharf’s operations. In 1991 Stanley added the magnificent upstairs 350 seater Wharfside Grill restaurant, which besides its authentic ambience and décor, boasts several nautical-themed private dining cabins, Crayclub cocktail bar and long deck overlooking the adjacent beach and harbour.

The revamp also featured an imposing lifeboat (hoisted alongside its upper deck) salvaged from a tanker shipwrecked near Hout Bay, a bakery, sushi bar and boutique wine and liquor store. Simultaneously the ground floor, already popular for its fish and chips bistro, was remodeled together with separate antique, jewellery, gift and seashell shops, evolving into Mariner’s Wharf becoming the unique attraction it is today.

Then came the dreaded COVID-19 world pandemic, compelling Mariner’s Wharf (as did most businesses worldwide) to close. When lockdown levels were lowered during May 2020 it slowly reopened, one department at a time.

Mariner’s Wharf continues to thrive under the watchful eyes of Stanley and the Dorman family, having not only become a local icon, but also a "must" for visitors from near and afar to experience.

== Literature ==
Fick, David S.: Entrepreneurship in Africa - A Study of Success. Praeger (March 30, 2002), ISBN 978-1567205367

Embracing Hout Bay book about the Dorman family and its developments

Stuttaford, Michael.: South African Fishing Industry Handbooks 1968-2000

Bulpin, T.V.: Discovering South Africa

Athiros, Gabriel and Louise.: Around the Cape in 80 Days

Westby-Nunn, Tony.: Hout Bay - an Illustrated Profile

== Media Articles ==
- Toohey, Terry.: Sea Breezes magazine article August 2025 about Mariner’s Wharf and Stanley Dorman Article
