= 1690s in South Africa =

- 1670s 1680s « 1690s » 1700s 1710s
- List of years in South Africa

The following lists events that happened during the 1690s in South Africa.

== Events ==
=== 1690 ===
- Settlers started moving beyond the Cape Colony driving off the Khoikhoi from the land
- Slaves in Stellenbosch attempt unsuccessfully to revolt
- 16 January - Wreck of the Galiot Noord, 24 km west of Cape St. Francis after a survey voyage to Delagoa Bay and Natal
- The Trek Boers settle beyond the Cape borders, clashing with the Khoikhoi and San. They raid their livestock, burn settlements, and seize land, whilst the Khoikhoi and San retaliate by attacking Trek Boer farms.
- The Kaapsche Vlek, or Cape hamlet, now has a few hundred houses and around 1,000 Europeans.

=== 1691 ===
- 1 June - Simon van der Stel is elevated to the rank of Governor of the Cape Colony
- Dutch Reformed Churches are founded in Drakenstein and Paarl

=== 1693 ===
- The road to Hout Bay via Constantia Nek in the Cape Colony is completed

=== 1695 ===
- 2 November - A total of 3,000 oak trees are planted in Wynberg following an order by Simon van der Stel

=== 1696 ===
- 30 March - Simon van der Stel appointed a new chief of the Khoikhoi, naming him Hasdrubal and giving him a brass headed stick bearing the arms of the Dutch East India Company

=== 1698 ===
- 27 May - Many are killed following the grounding of the ship Gravenstein at Roodestrand near Camps Bay

=== 1699 ===
- 11 February- Willem Adriaan van der Stel, son of Simon van del Stel, is appointed Governor of the Cape Colony.
- The Dutch East India Company galleon, the Wesel is dispatched to find the Prince Edward Islands but could not find them
- Sheikh Yusuf dies in Zandvliet at the age of 73. His widows and daughters are allowed to return to Batavia, whilst others remain in the Cape.
- Pierre Simond rewrites Psalms during his time in the Berg River Valley.
- The Cape Colony opposes further French refugee arrivals, and the Lords XVII rules to send only Lutheran colonists.
- Dirk Coetsee is granted Uiterwyk in Bottelary as an estate.
- Daentie Rycken returns to the Cape with her son, Cornelis Jansz Uys.
- The oldest church in South Africa, a Dutch Reformed one, finishes construction.

== Bibliography ==
See Years in South Africa for further sources.
