= Anna de Coningh =

Early South African slave and progenitrix

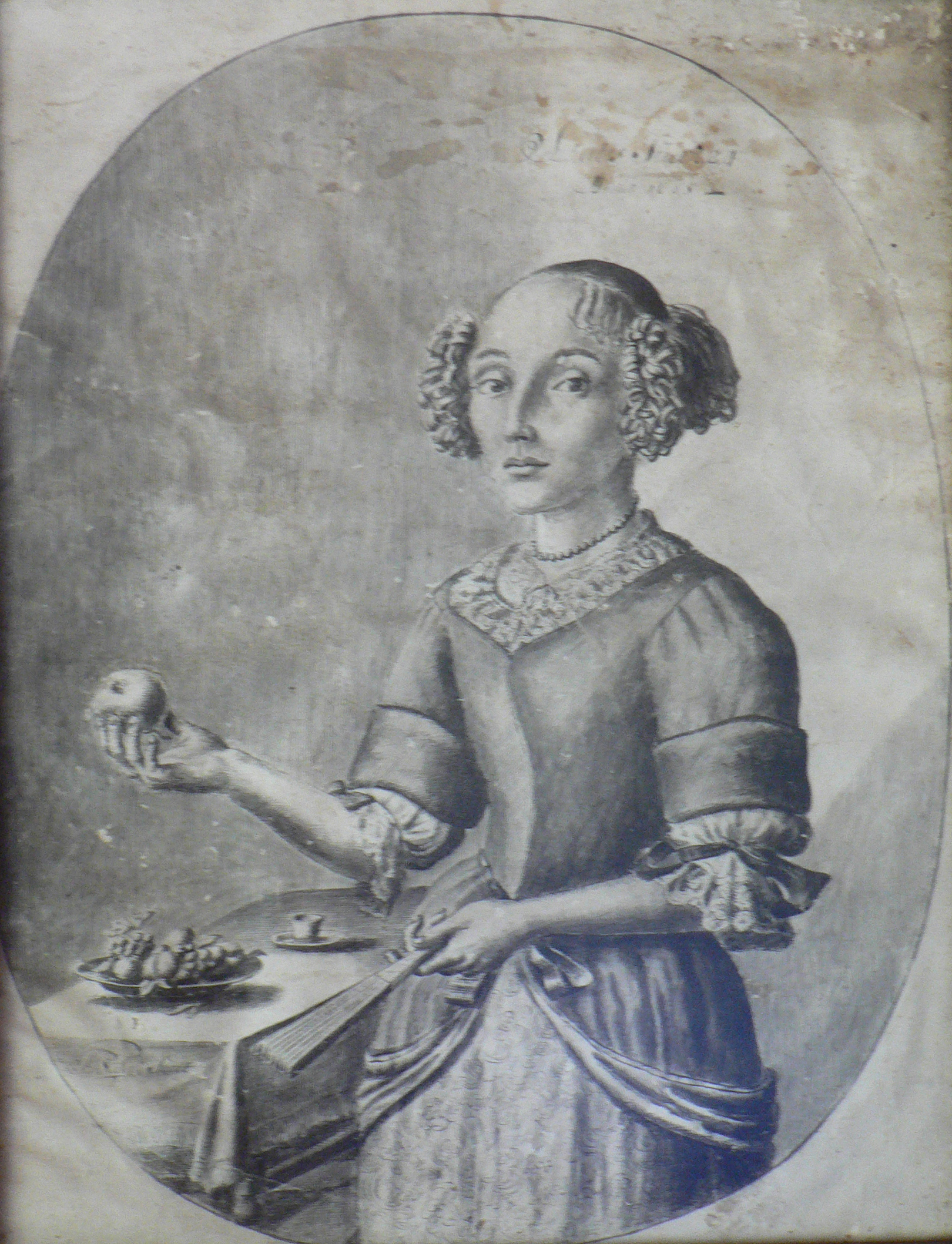
- Portrait of Anna de Coningh in 1685
- Born: 1661; Cape Town, Cape Colony
- Died: 1733; Constantia, Cape Colony
- Spouse: Olof Bergh
- Parents: François de Coninck (unconfirmed) (father); Angela van Bengale (mother)

Anna de Coningh was the wife of early Swedish explorer Olof Bergh and the daughter of an enslaved woman, Angela van Bengale and a white father.

Having started life amongst some of the poorest inhabitants of the Cape, Anna died one of the wealthiest members of Cape society. She was the third owner of the well-known South African wine estate Groot Constantia, having inherited it from her husband after his death, as well as several other estates around the Colony.

== Life ==
Not much is known for certain about Anna's early life, as meticulous records were not kept on individual slaves. It is known that her mother was Angela van Bengale, who had been brought to the Cape as one of the earliest known slaves, presumably from the Ganges Delta (as indicated by her name). Anna is presumed to have been born at the Cape around 1661 to a white father. It is not known for certain who her father was, but a man named François de Koninck from Ghent (in modern-day Belgium) was at the Cape around this time, and Anna's last name would suggest it might have been him.

Anna may have been baptised at the Cape in 1661, as was common for both Christian children as well as slaves or others seeking manumission or acceptance into free Cape society. In 1666, when her mother's owner, Abraham Gabbema, was transferred to Batavia, he manumitted her along with three of her children. Anna was presumably one of these and so would also have been freed in that year. Following her emancipation, Anna's mother Angela, had a further 7 children following her post manumission marriage to Arnoldus Willemsz from Wesel (later known as Arnoldus Willemsz Basson).

On 10 September 1678, Anna married a Swedish explorer and VOC official Olof Bergh at the Cape starting an unprecedented rise in her social status as a former slave. Anna had 11 children with Bergh. As was the case for many women at that time, not much was written about Anna specifically, apart from that which was noted about her husband, although her fortunes being closely bound to those of her husband, she became an increasingly prominent figure in Cape society as his own status increased.

Despite her very poor upbringing, following her husband's death in 1724, as a result of her inheriting her husband's large estate, Anna became one of the wealthiest women in the Colony (if not one of the wealthiest members of society in totality) until her own death in 1733. She owned several homes in and around Cape Town, a number of farms that were both close to the town as well as near present-day Kuils Rivier, Saxenburg and Durbanville. She became the third owner of Governor Simon van der Stel's wine estate, Groot Constantia, South Africa's oldest wine estate, where several of her belongings as well as her portrait are still on display today.

== Legacy ==
As a result of her life as both a one-time half-slave and the wealthiest woman (and by many accounts, one of the wealthiest members of Cape society of either gender), Anna has been noted as the beneficiary of one of the unlikeliest strokes of good fortune. Her life from poverty to wealth has been novelised, along with that of her husband, in the novel "Kites of Good Fortune - The story of Anna de Coningh".

During the difficult Governorship of Willem Adriaan Van Der Stel, it was famously reported in the diary of Adam Tas that Anna prevented the Governor's wife Maria from committing suicide by trying to drown herself on Christmas Eve, December 1705.

"Thursday the 24th. Fair morning. Our labourers were busy carting the corn to the homestead, and cutting what corn was still standing. They tell me this day that the Governor's wife had, in a fit of despondency, tried to drown herself by jumping into the fountain behind the house at the Cape; however, Mrs. Berg was on the spot, and ran to help her, pulling her out of the water, to whom the Governor's wife lamented bitterly that her life had become one of terror for her on account of the many scandalous acts she must daily hear and witness. A singular affair, which gives reason for not a little thought ... ".

— Adam Tas, Dagboek (1705-1706)

Anna is also remembered through the epononymous wine "Anna de Koning", which is produced at one of her husband's former estates.

As part of a double portrait (painted circa 1685) with her husband Olof, Anna is the only early former enslaved person at the Cape of whom a portrait is known.

At the time of her death, Anna owned around 27 slaves herself. As is the case for her own mother, Anna is now considered to be one of the stammoeders ("founding mothers") of South African society, from whom many South Africans of both European and non-European descent (such as all members of the Bergh family), can trace their heritage directly.
