= 1684 in South Africa =

- Decades
- See also: List of years in South Africa

The following lists events that happened during 1684 in South Africa.

== Incumbents ==
- Governor of the Cape Colony - Simon van der Stel

== Events ==
- The VOC imposes price controls on hides, skins, ivory, and ostrich eggs. This change causes indigenous groups to increase illicit trade.
- The Castle of Good Hope's bell tower finishes construction.
- Changamire Dombo I expands the Rozwi empire into parts of North-East South Africa and modern-day Limpopo.
- The Francis, and English ship, sails to Durban to trade ivory.
- Hans Jurgen Grimp and Hendrik Elberts retire from the heemraden, and are replaced by Jan Mostert and Harmen Smit.
- The VOC stoppes interior cattle trading, handing it to Captain Klaas who begins to acquire large herds.
- New outposts are established at Kuilen, Diep River, Visser's Hok, and Rietvlei.
- The first grain export leaves South Africa, and tithes are suspended for two years to boost production.
- Hendrik Adriaan van Rheede is appointed high commissioner to reform administration in Hindostan and Ceylon.
- Hottentots feast on dead whales that wash ashore in South Africa.
- Several voyages come to Port Natal in search of slaves.
