= 1706 in South Africa =

- Decades
- See also: List of years in South Africa

The following lists events that happened during 1706 in South Africa.

== Incumbents ==
- Governor of the Cape Colony - Willem Adriaan van der Stel

== Events ==
- Adam Tas drafts a memorandum of complaint to the VOC Directorate in Batavia on behalf of farming burghers.
- Adam Tas' memorandum accuses Willem Adriaan van der Stel and officials of illicit farming, trading, illegal landholding, and monopolies on wine, wheat, and meat.
- Willem Adriaan van der Stel orders the arrest of Adam Tas and 60 signatories, causing the VOC to remove the Governor, Lieutenant Governor, Chaplain, and Landdrost from their positions at the Cape.
- The VOC officials are forced to relinquish their land, and monopolies are revoked, as the VOC reaffirms its policy prohibiting officials from farming and trading, restricting them to administrative duties.
