= 1710s in South Africa =

- 1690s 1700s « 1710s » 1720s 1730s
- List of years in South Africa

The following lists events that happened during the 1710s in South Africa.

== Events ==
=== 1711 ===
- 28 December - Willem Helot is appointed acting Governor of the Cape Colony

=== 1713 ===
- Governor of the Cape Colony - Louis van Assenberg
- 16 March - A smallpox epidemic broke out at the Cape Colony. A smallpox outbreak kills 25% of the White Cape population and devastates the Cape Khoikhoi. The Khoikhoi, due to a lack of immunity, have their population nearly wiped. 90% of the Khoikhoi population ends up being killed in the smallpox epidemic.
- Cape slaves flee but are captured and punished. Thomas van Bengalen is hanged, and the leader Tromp van Madagascar is sentenced to impalement but commits suicide. Other Cape captives have their Achilles tendons severed or feet broken on the wheel.
- A Cape labour shortage follows, land becomes "ownerless" and is taken by colonial cattle farmers.

=== 1714 ===
- 28 March - Maurits Pasques de Chavonnes is appointed Governor of the Cape
- New leasing conditions introduced by the Dutch East India Company in Cape Town. Among the new conditions were rights to cultivate cereals subject to a tithe and transfer rights through sale and inheritance.

=== 1715 ===
- The Trek Boers raid Khoikhoi cattle near Saldanha Bay.
- A list of all the free men at the Dutch Cape Colony is compiled for 1715. It is divided into three districts; the Cape of Good Hope, Stellenbosch and the Drakenstein.
- Khoisan in Land van Waveren attack the European farmers, stealing 200 cattle and several thousand sheep.
- The Constantia estate is sold after the Dutch government orders the confiscation of the Van der Stel lands.
- Abraham de Villiers acquires the Boschendal farm estate.
- The Lady of Good Hope is introduced to the coat of arms of the Cape Colony.
- The Isle de France in the Indian Ocean becomes a French colony.

=== 1717 ===
- The system of freehold title to land in the Cape ends

== Deaths ==
- 27 December 1711 - Louis van Assenburgh, Governor of the Cape, dies
- 24 June 1712 - Simon van der Stel, Governor of the Cape, died at his estate in Constantia, Cape Colony
