= 1682 in South Africa =

- Decades
- See also: List of years in South Africa

The following lists events that happened during 1682 in South Africa.

== Incumbents ==
- Governor of the Cape Colony - Simon van der Stel

== Events ==
- General Rijckloff van Goens orders Governor Simon van der Stel to oppose racial mixing at the Cape Colony.
- The Johanna, a British East Indiaman ship, departs Kent in England for Surat in India, under Captain Robert Brown.
- The Johanna wrecks off South Africa's coast at Outside Reef, near Quoin Point. The survivors of the wreck reach Cape Town with help from the locals.
- Simon van der Stel orders Olaf Bergh to recover the lost cargo. The VOC ends up retrieving 2,400 sterling pounds in coins, brandy, wine, and beer.
- The entrance to the Castle of Good Hope begins construction.
- The wine estate Coetsenburg is established.
