= 1720s in South Africa =

- 1700s 1710s « 1720s » 1730s 1740s
- List of years in South Africa

The following lists events that happened during the 1720s in South Africa.

== Events ==
=== 1722 ===
- Groot Constantia was built
- 17 January - Sampson and Amstelveer, richly laden, are wrecked on the southern coast, beginning a disastrous year for Dutch ships in South Africa
- 17 June - A gale lasting several days drives away ten ships lying at anchor in Table Bay harbour. All the ships sank, and 660 people lost their lives

=== 1724 ===
- 14 February - An expedition leaves Cape Town to establish ports along the east coast. The members reach Delagoa Bay and build a fort, but are later raided by English pirates
- 8 September - Jan de la Fontaine provisionally becomes Governor of the Cape Colony

=== 1727 ===
- 25 February - Pieter Gysbert Noodt becomes Governor of the Cape

=== 1728 ===
- 28 April - Jan de la Fontaine is again appointed provisional Governor of the Cape
- 3 July - The ship Middenmark is driven on the rocks in Table Bay by a strong wind and 75 people are drowned
- A conflict escalates between the Trek Boers and the Khoikhoi, and Khoikhoi are forcibly displaced with their land and livestock taken. The skirmish results in 12 Khoikhoi killed by gunfire.

== Deaths ==
- 21 May 1721 - Johan Cornelis d'Ableing, acting Governor of the Cape, dies
- 1724 - Olof Bergh, Swedish explorer to Namaqualand, dies in Cape Town, aged 81
- 8 September 1724 - Maurits Pasques de Chavonnes, Governor of the Cape, dies
- 23 April 1729 - Pieter Gysbert Noodt, Governor of the Cape, dies of a sudden heart attack at the age of 48 during the hanging of four soldiers who had deserted
