= 1700s in South Africa =

- 1680s 1690s « 1700s » 1710s 1720s
- List of years in South Africa

The following lists events that happened during the 1700s in South Africa. As the century begins, Willem Adriaan van der Stel continues as the Governor of the Cape Colony.

== Events ==
=== 1700 ===
- A new Dutch ordinance restricts the importation of Asian slaves.
- The Dlamini chiefdoms migrate south, forming the core of the Swazi nation.
- The free burghers are allowed to trade with the Khoikhoi, causing economic decline for the latter.
- The Dutch lift inland trek restrictions, enabling colonial expansion to Winterberg, Witzenberg, and Roodezand.
- Portuguese mineral interests in Africa shift to ivory as gold resources dwindle.

=== 1701 ===
- A Khoikhoi-San raid ends up with over 40+ cattle being stolen from Dutch farmers at the Cape.
- The Ashante of Ghana conquer the Denkyira, and another potential avenue of coastal trade for the VOC is opened.
- The Koopmans de Wet House is built by Reijnier Smedinga, a silversmith and jeweler, after Willem Adriaan van der Stel granted plots 7 and 8 on Strand Street.
- The Dutch East India Company enforces Dutch-only education and strict assembly laws, leading to Huguenots losing their distinct identity.

=== 1702 ===
- 3 April—The Merenstejin, a Dutch merchant ship, sinks off Jutten Island on the west coast of the Cape Colony

=== 1703 ===
- Licenses are issued to stock farmers, to graze cattle beyond colonial boundaries, on the Khoikhoi land.

=== 1704 ===
- The Free Trade embargo against the Khoikhoi is lifted.
- Adam Tas writes his diary of 1704, later becoming a personification of the free burghers' struggle against colonialism, and being responsible for the future creation of Historical Publications Southern Africa.
- Daentie Rycken, Uys family progenitor, settles on the By Den Weg farm in Stellenbosch Kloof.

=== 1706 ===
- 28 February—Adam Tas, a community leader in the Cape Colony, is jailed for drafting a petition accusing local VOC officials of corruption and money laundering

=== 1707 ===
- 17 January—Rev. E.F. Le Bourg, a parson of whom Batavia was glad to be rid, arrives in Cape Town. He enters politics and stirs up trouble
- 3 June—Johan Cornelis d'Ableing is appointed acting Governor of the Cape Colony
- Ravelins are added around this time on the on either side of the gateway's defense by the 1703 order of Harman de Wilde at the Castle of Good Hope.

=== 1708 ===
- 17 January—The Cape Council of Policy resolves to deport Rev. E.F. Le Bourg
- 1 February—Louis van Assenburgh is appointed Governor of the Cape

== Births ==
- 1700—Hendrik Swellengrebel, later governor of the Dutch Cape Colony, is born in Cape Town on 20 September
