= 1721 in South Africa =

- Decades
- See also: List of years in South Africa

The following lists events that happened during 1721 in South Africa.

== Incumbents ==
- Governor of the Cape Colony - Maurits Pasques de Chavonnes

== Events ==
- The VOC sends soldiers aboard the Gouda and Zeelandia to occupy Rio de Lagoa, or Delagoa Bay. At this time, the Tembe chiefdom controlled trade.
- Johan Cornelis d'Ableing, former acting Governor of the Cape, dies.
- Maurits Pasques de Chavonnes is promoted from Cape Colony Governor to Justice of India.
- Nicolaus Laubscher, founder of Oranjezicht, dies.
- A slave trading operation is established in Rio de Lagoa, where the VOC trade about 25 slaves annually.
- Elephant herds disappeared from the Delagoa region, affecting the VOC ivory trade.
- Drought severely affects South East African gardening efforts, with temperatures too high and no consistent rainy season.
- The first barrel of blue beads arrives at Delagoa Bay for trade.
- Ivory is withheld until Dutch ships are prepared to leave, as the locals are suspecting a secret bead stash.
- There is a high mortality rate at the VOC post in Delagoa, as two-thirds of the 620 men die in six weeks.
