= Historical Publications Southern Africa =

Historical society and publisher

Historical Publications Southern Africa (HiPSA) is a South African text publication society which publishes or republishes primary sources relating to southern African history. It was founded in 1918 as the Van Riebeeck Society for the Publication of Southern African Historical Documents, usually abbreviated as the Van Riebeeck Society (VRS). It changed to its present name in 2017, with the first volume published under the new name appearing in 2019. Since the society's foundation, with rare exceptions, a new volume has been published annually. Fees from subscribing members finance the publications. The society sets out to make historical sources available to the average reader, but it also maintain a high academic standard and has produced valuable Africana.

== Origins ==
Since its inception the society has had close links with the National Library of South Africa (South African Library) in Cape Town. Two men who were instrumental in the Society's founding were A. C. G. Lloyd, librarian of the South African Public Library, and John X. Merriman, at one time prime minister of the Cape Colony and a trustee of the library.

The discovery by Lloyd in November 1911 of a large fragment of Adam Tas's diary of 1704 was to a large extent responsible for the society's creation. As leader of the free burghers opposed to the Dutch East India Company and governor of the Cape, Willem Adriaan van der Stel, Tas personified the struggle against colonialism. The trustees of the library raised the funds needed to publish the diary in 1914.

With surplus money from the publication fund, it was decided to publish Baron van Pallandt's General Remarks on the Cape of Good Hope, an 1803 pamphlet originally written in French, printed clandestinely and suppressed by Uitenhage De Mist, and consequently a rare work. This was published in 1917 and met with the disapproval of General J. B. M. Hertzog, the then prime minister, who was upset by passages describing the poor treatment meted out to the Khoikhoi by the settlers. Hertzog's denunciation of the work led to enormously increased sales.

Bolstered by this success, the trustees decided to publish certain reports on the Cape by Governor Maurits Pasques de Chavonnes, and by the commissioner at the Cape, Baron Gustaaf Willem van Imhoff. However, the library's mandate did not include publishing archival documents so that a decision was taken to found a private society to deal with the management of the project. This led on 29 August 1918 to the first meeting of the society. The initial membership was 54, many being members of parliament, and the de Chavonnes reports made up the first publication.
