= Abraham Bogaert =

Dutch author and pharmacist

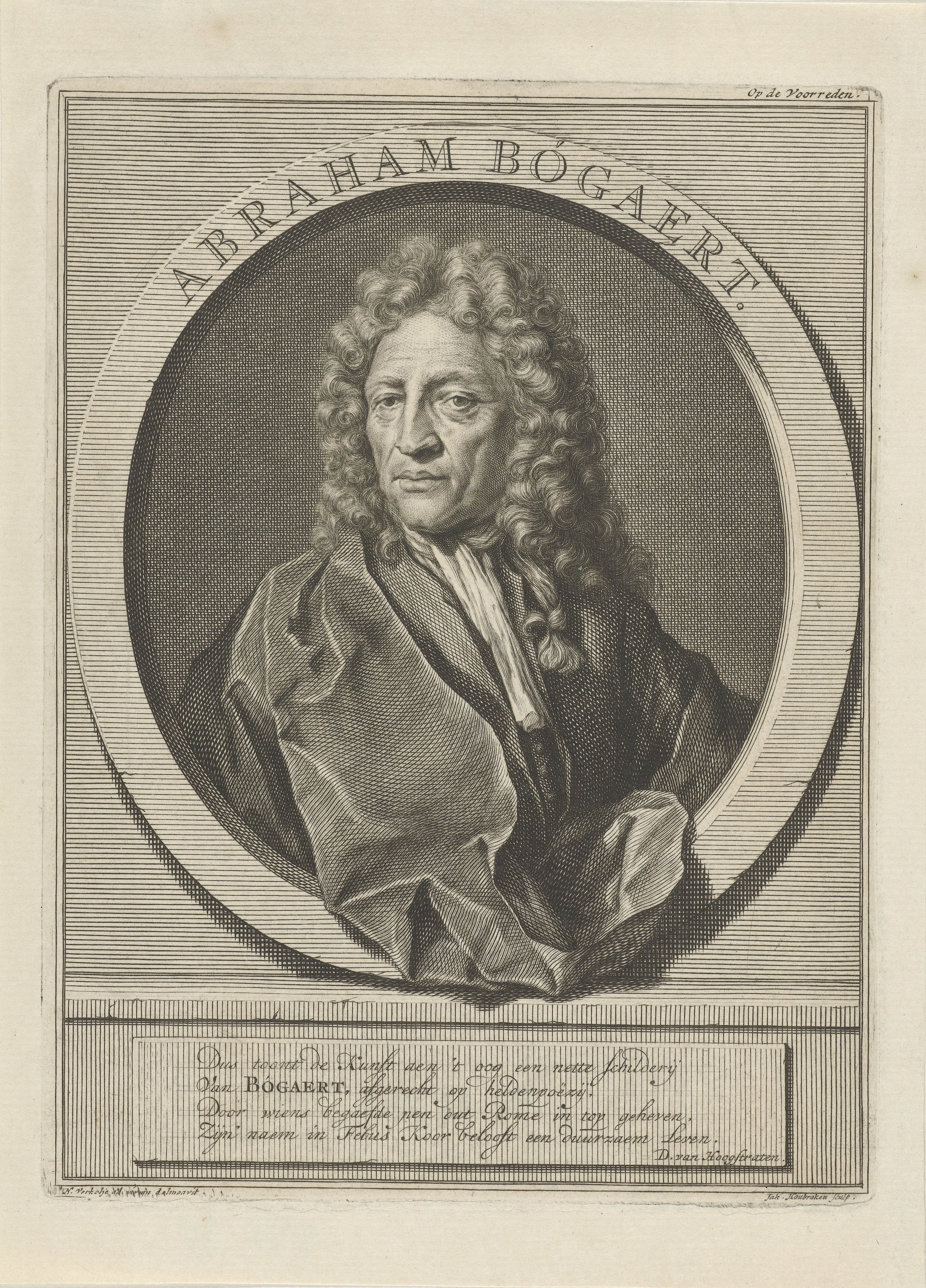
Abraham Bogaert

Abraham Bogaert (October 7, 1663, Amsterdam - December 1, 1727, Amsterdam) was a pharmacist, writer and poet who played a major role in the rebellion of the Free Burghers against the government of Governor Willem Adriaan van der Stel, while also writing poems about this uprising and life at the Cape.

Joris Van Eijnatten said Bogaert was "The Dutch translator of the Turkish spy (was) Abraham Bogaert (1663-1727), an apothecary and man of letters who travelled widely in the service of the East India Company, and later published an account of his travels along the Asian coast."

In 1683 he married and thereafter he served as a ship's doctor in the service of the East India Company. He visited Siam in 1690. In 1701 he was already undertaking his third voyage to the East in his post as chief physician, where he made his way to the Cape in July 1702. From there he went to Batavia where he was the chief physician and later became a merchant. As a merchant, he traveled through Bengal, Ceylon and India. On his return to Holland he re-entered the Cape in 1706 and took the famous petition of Adam Tas, against the government of Willem Adriaan van der Stel, on April 4, 1706, to Holland. As an artist he drew various Cape scenes during his stay.

== Personal life ==
Abraham Bogaert was baptized on 7 October 1663 in Amsterdam. In 1683, he married Catharina Scholten, daughter of Philip Scholten and Catharina Wechters. Together the couple had two children, Hendrik (b. 1686), and Philip (b.1687).

He died on December 1, 1727, in Amsterdam.

== Writings ==
In 1711, at the appearance of the Contra-accusation in which Adam Tas and Jakob van der Heiden refuted all the accusations of Governor Willem Adriaan van der Stel, he wrote eighteenth century fashion an introductory verse for their book, Op de Contradeductie der Kaapsche Voort, edited by Jakob van der Heiden, and Adam Tas. This poem is recorded in a thousand and a few poems in Gerrit Komrij's anthology of the Afrikaans Poetry.

Later he also wrote in favor of the farmers in the two parts of Historical Travels through the eastern parts of Asia and in his De Gedichten. 'T Curious Aege is a farce performed at the Amsterdam Theater. The Myrrha tragedy is based on Ovid's Metamorphoses and has the mythological Myrrha as a protagonist. She is a young woman who is desperately in love with her father Cinyras. This drama is remarkable in that at the end of the drama, seven main characters have died, either through murder, accident or suicide. These deaths can be seen as comments on the selfishness and immorality of each of these characters and their death is then a way of restoring the moral order. Rhadamist and Zenobia and Phocion are both mourning games.

| Year | Publication |
|---|---|
| 1679 | ’T Nieuwsgierige Aegje |
| 1688 | Myrrha of de gestrafte bloedschande |
| 1693 | Satyra VIII of Achtste Berispdicht |
| 1695 | S Schijnvoets Muntkabinet der Roomsche keizers en keizerinnen invaarzen beschreven |
| 1697 | Keurstoffen van Aloude Griekse en Romeinse Grootmoedigheden in Bijschriften en Puntdichten |
| 1711 | De gewaande Droes |
| | Historische Reizen door d’oostersche deelen van Asia (deel I) |
| 1713 | Rhadamistus en Zenobia |
| 1719 | Historie van de grondlegging der Nederlandse vrijheid |
| 1723 | De gedichten. Met printverbeeldingen |
| 1724 | Geuzevelt, of De lustplaats van den heere Antony Klok |
| 1730 | Historische Reizen door d’oostersche deelen van Asia 1711 (deel II) |
| 1733 | Phocion |
