= 1717 in South Africa =

- Decades
- See also: List of years in South Africa

The following lists events that happened during 1717 in South Africa.

== Incumbents ==
- Governor of the Cape Colony - Maurits Pasques de Chavonnes

== Events ==
- Future land grants become loan farms instead of freehold, requiring farmers to pay rent to the VOC. The 400 freehold farms already granted remain unaffected.
- The total Cape Colony population is estimated at 744 officials, 2000 burghers, and 2700 slaves.
- The ban on free trade with the Khoikhoi is reinstated, after previously being suspended in 1704.
- The VOC establishes an administrative post at Ziekenhuys to control the Cape Colony's eastern borders.
- The VOC restricts European settlement to address burgher unrest, frontier conflicts, and agricultural overproduction.
- Assisted European immigration is halted, and future development is to rely solely on slave labor.
