= Hendrik Claudius =

German painter and apothecary

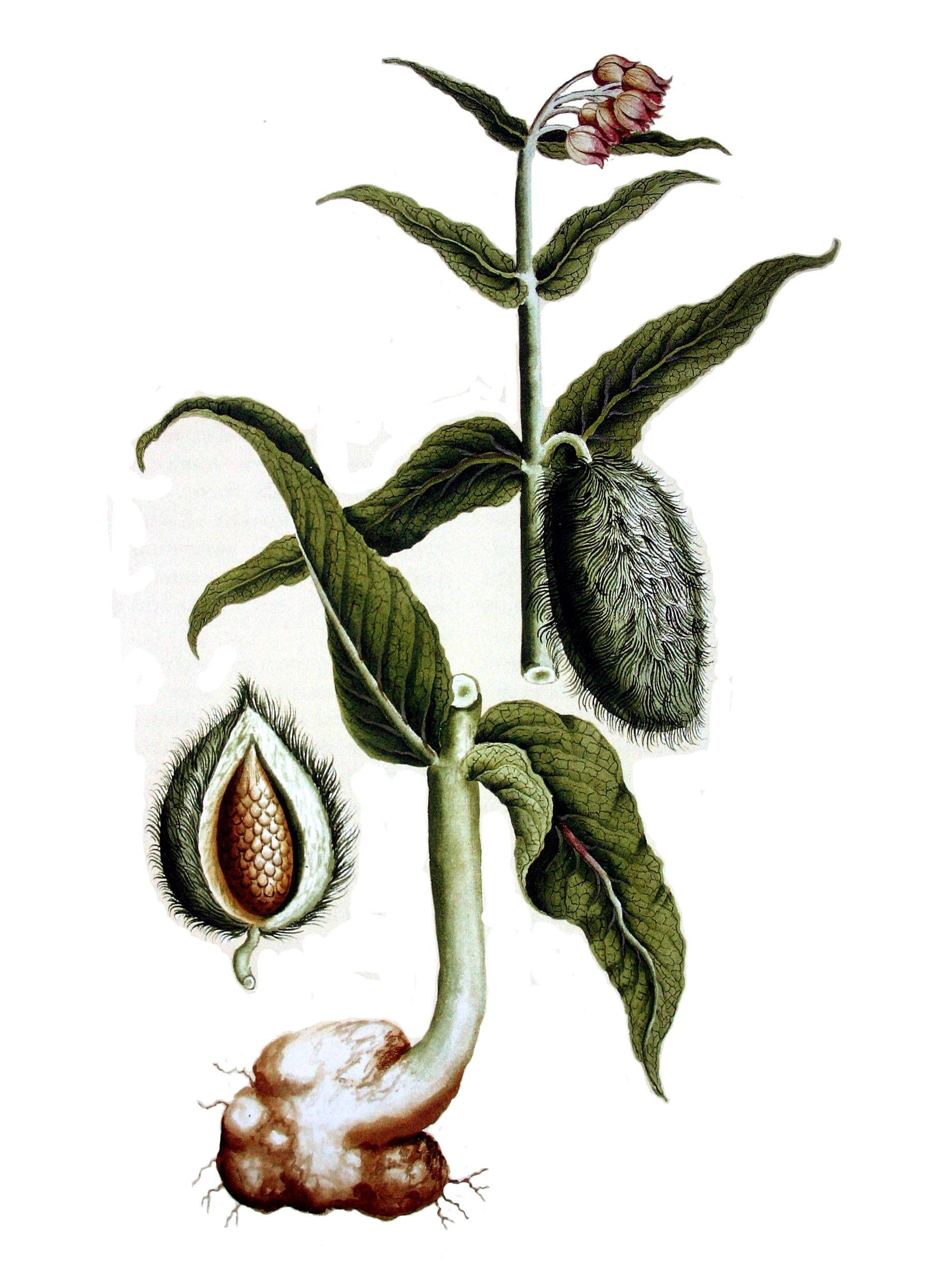
Gomphocarpus cancellatus Simon van der Stel's journey to Namaqualand 1685

Hendrik Claudius aka Heinrich Claudius (c. 1655 Breslau — after 1697 Holland) was a German painter and apothecary or physician, noted for his 17th-century watercolours of South African plants and animals.

Claudius arrived in the Cape Colony from Batavia in 1682 to paint plants of medicinal interest. He joined Ensign Olof Bergh's second expedition in 1683 to Namaqualand in a quest to locate the source of rich copper ore. It is thought that two years later he also joined Governor Simon van der Stel who had the same goal, and that he was responsible for the illustrations in an account of the expedition. He is also regarded as one of the artists contributing to Jacob Breyne's Exoticarum aliarumque minus cognitarum plantarum centuria prima. In all, the Africana Museum in Johannesburg acquired some 433 original watercolours ascribed to him. His work is also held by the South African Library in Cape Town, the British Museum, the library of Trinity College in Dublin and the University library of Marburg in Hesse. Many of the Claudius paintings were copied at the Cape in 1692 for Nicolaes Witsen, Mayor of Amsterdam, who included the copies in his Codex Witsenii.

Most of what is known about Claudius stems from his 1685 meeting with the visiting French Jesuit missionary, Father Guy Tachard. After seeing two large volumes of his works, Tachard ventured that Claudius was a competent painter of plants and animals, and that if the books had been for sale he would have purchased them for Louis XIV of France. Some of his further and rather indiscreet revelations in Voyage de Siam led to Claudius' deportation to Mauritius and Batavia by Simon van der Stel. Tachard wrote: "It is from him that we obtained all our knowledge of the country. He gave us a little map made by his own hand." This, during a period when the Dutch occupiers of the Cape were extremely suspicious of the French and their designs on the southern tip of Africa.
