= Willem Helot =

Acting Governor of the Cape Colony

Acting Governor of the Dutch Cape Colony
- In office 27 December 1711 – 28 March 1714
- Preceded by: Louis van Assenburgh
- Succeeded by: Maurits Pasques de Chavonnes

Personal details
- Born: 27 October 1675 Amsterdam
- Died: 7 November 1749 (aged 74) Amsterdam
- Spouse(s): Christina de Beer; Maria Engelbrecht

Willem Helot (27 October 1675 – 7 November 1749), was secunde and Acting Governor of the Cape Colony.

== Career ==
Helot arrived at the Cape as a soldier in 1694 and Simon van der Stel employed him provisionally as an assistant and he was later permanently appointed to serve as assistant and chief clerk. In 1706 he was secretary of the Council of Policy and on 9 June 1707 he was promoted to assistant merchant. In April 1710 he was given the post of chief merchant, becoming secunde (second-in-command) at the Cape.

After the death of Governor Louis van Assenburgh in 1711, Helot acted as Governor until the arrival of Maurits Pasques de Chavonnes on 28 March 1714. He subsequently again served as secunde or chief administrator, but in May 1714 he was accused of dishonesty and dereliction of duty and after a suspension, he was dismissed from the service of the VOC. In 1715 he left with his wife and children for the Netherlands.

== Personal life ==
Helot was married twice. His first marriage took place in 1704, to Christina de Beer, the daughter of the Cape free burgher Jan Dirksz de Beer and his wife, Anna van Veldhuisen. Their three daughters, Wilhelmina, Anna Christina and Louisa Adriana, were baptised in 1705, 1707 and 1709 respectively. After Christina's death in 1709, he married Maria Engelbrecht on 27 July 1710.

== See also ==
- 1710s in South Africa
