= Angela van Bengale =

South African progenitrix

- Born: circa 1641; Bengal, India
- Died: 1720; Cape Town, Cape Colony
- Other names: Maai Angela, Anseijla, Engela
- Occupation: Slave
- Spouse: Arnoldus Willemsz Basson
- Partners: François de Coninck; Jan van Assen
- Children: Anna de Coningh; Johannes van As; Jacobus van As; Pieter van As; Gerrit Basson; Elsie van der Sande (Basson); Michiel Basson; Maria Basson; Catharina Basson; Albertus Basson; Johannes Willemsz Basson
- Parents: Unknown (father); Unknown (mother)

Angela van Bengale was one of the earliest known slaves taken to the Cape Colony and the mother of former slave and later wealthy socialite Anna de Coningh.

== Early life ==
Not much is known about Angela's life prior to her arrival at the Cape of Good Hope, apart from the fact that she was most likely captured in the Ganges Delta, in present-day West Bengal, India and Bangladesh. Following her capture, she was likely taken to a slave trading station in Ceylon or Myanmar. From there, she was transported to the Batavia (present day Jakarta) before being despatched to the Cape.

== Arrival at the Cape and manumission ==
She was brought to the Cape on the VOC ship Prins Willem by the Freeburgher Pieter Kemp, who after his arrival at the Cape, sold her to Jan Van Riebeeck, making her one of the first slaves brought to South Africa. When Van Riebeeck left the Cape in 1662, Angela was sold to another burgher, Abraham Gabbema, who finally freed Angela (and her three children, Anna de Coningh, Jacobus and Johannes van As) on 13 April 1666 just before his own departure for Jakarta.

As was required for manumission, Gabbema arranged for Angela to be baptized, which she was on 29 April 1668, as well as to complete a short apprenticeship as a baker with his friend Thomas Christoffel Muller. In being baptized, Angela became the first adult former slave to be baptized at the Cape. Following her emancipation, Angela petitioned the then VOC commander Cornelis van Quaelbergen for a small tract of land which she acquired near Heerestraat (present day Strand Street) in Cape Town on 25 February 1667.

In attaining her freedom, Angela is reported to have been the first slave woman freed without being legally bound to be married to a man, the third female, and the fourth slave overall freed at the Cape.

== Relationships and children ==
Prior to or shortly after her arrival at the Cape, Angela was reported to have had a relationship with VOC company official Francois de Koninck from Ghent, with whom she bore her first child, a daughter named Anna (later known as Anna de Coningh). After Francois, Angela had another relationship with a Company employee, Jan van Assen. He was originally from Brussels and would have two sons with her; Johannes and Jacobus, and a third Pieter, who did not survive.

Following her emancipation and baptism, Angela married burgher Arnoldus Willemsz Basson, with whom she went on to have a further seven children.

Through her early arrival at the Cape, as well as parentage of several children, Angela is considered to be a "founding mother" ("stammoeder") of many present day South Africans, including the Basson family in South Africa.

Angela died of natural causes in 1720, leaving at least two properties as well as a reported 15 000 guilders in her estate. This made her a woman of considerable wealth.
