= Van der Stel =

Van der Stel is a Dutch surname. Notable people with the surname include:

- Adriaan van der Stel (died 1646), Dutch governor of Mauritius
- Arie van der Stel (1894–1986), Dutch cyclist
- Simon van der Stel (1639–1712), Dutch colonial governor
- Willem Adriaan van der Stel (1664–1733), Dutch colonial governor
