= 1680s in South Africa =

- 1660s 1670s « 1680s » 1690s 1700s
- List of years in South Africa

The following events happened in South Africa during the 1680s.

== Events ==
=== 1680 ===
- Land is given to Dutch farmers along the Eerste River in the Cape Colony

=== 1681 ===
- March - Deported Islamic religious leaders arrive from Batavia, later to become the Cape Malay community

=== 1682 ===
- 8 June - The Johanna, a British East Indiaman sailing from Kent to Surat, India under the command of Captain Robert Brown is shipwrecked off Cape Agulhas

=== 1683 ===
- Cape Colonists petition for a school in Stellenbosch for the 30 families that are there.
- Sybrand Mankadan is appointed as a teacher in Stellenbosch, alongside being a preacher and sick-visitor.
- Sheikh Yusuf is captured and exiled by the Dutch to Ceylon, eventually arriving at the Cape of Good Hope 11 years later.
- Olof Bergh leads another expedition to the Nama people. Olof Bergh's expedition attempts to reach the Tropic of Capricorn, but is halted by drought and rough terrain near the Doornbosch River. The travel diaries of Olof Bergh contribute to the evolution of Dutch into Afrikaans
- The first use of "bosjesmans" (bushmen) for indigenous people and "Afrijkaenders" for Dutch settlers is recorded.
- The VOC establishes a cattle stock-farm at Klapmuts.
- Hawthornden House in Wynberg has its original construction.

=== 1684 ===
- The Dutch East India Company unilaterally establishes price controls over hides, skins, ivory and ostrich eggs in the Cape Colony
- An English ship arrives off the eastern coast of KwaZulu-Natal to trade for ivory

=== 1685 ===
- 17 May - The English ketch Good Hope is shipwrecked off Bay of Natal
- The Cape Colonists send a commissioner to Europe to attract more settlers
- Copper is discovered by the settlers in Namaqualand
- Simon van der Stel, the Governor of the Cape Colony, is granted a 900-morgen property and is named Groot Constantia
- Simon van der Stel visits Namaqualand
- The VOC Commissioner Hendrik van Rheede decrees male slaves to be freed at 25 and females at 22, with targeted work training provided, but this is never enacted upon.
- A slave school is established in the Slave Lodge for VOC slave children.
- Marriages between Dutchmen and female slaves are prohibited, unless the slave has a Dutch father.
- After decades of exploration, an expedition involving Simon van der Stel and other Dutch settlers discovers copper deposits in Namaqualand.
- Simon van der Stel makes the oldest visible engravings of the Heerenlogement cave.
- The Amersfoort anchors at the Cape with a 174-slaves cargo.
- A Constantia farm is granted by the VOC to Simon van der Stel.
- The revocation of the Edict of Nantes leads to the persecution of Huguenots in France. The VOC encourages Huguenot immigration to the Cape for agriculture.

=== 1686 ===
- 16 February - A Dutch East India Company ship Stavemisse is shipwrecked about 112 km south of Port of Natal
- 25 December - An English ketch Bona Ventura is shipwrecked at St Lucia Bay
- A Dutch Reformed Church is founded in Stellenbosch, Cape Colony

=== 1687 ===
- Free burghers in the Cape Colony petition the Dutch East India Company to extend the slave trade to private enterprise
- The Paarl settlement is established in the Cape Colony

=== 1688 ===
- 6 January - A Dutch ship, Rosenberg sets sail from the Netherlands carrying fleeing French Huguenots after the revocation of the Edict of Nantes
- April - The Honselaarsdijk, a first of nine VOC ships carrying around 200 Huguenots, arrives in Table Bay.
- Simon van der Stel sets aside land for Huguenot settlements in Franschhoek and Drakenstein.
- The Huguenot refugees from France begin to mainly settle in Franschhoek.
- Flemish merchant Jacques De Savoye founds the Vrede en Lust winefarm after fleeing Europe due to religious persecution.

=== 1689 ===
- 4 January - The Dutch East India Company ship, the Noord became the first ship to sail into the Bay of Natal to search for survivors of the Stavenisse shipwreck of 1686
- 26 April - The French ship Normandie is captured by the Dutch in Table Bay
- Serious friction develops between the Huguenots and the Dutch settlers

== Deaths ==
- 1689 - IJsbrand Goske, Governor of the Cape Colony, dies

== See also ==
- Years in South Africa
