= Olof Bergh =

Early South African Cape Dutch explorer and VOC official

Olof Martini Bergh
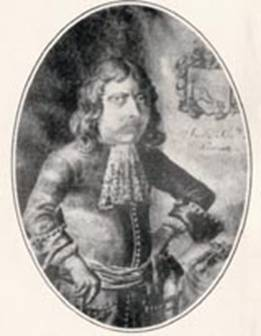
- Portrait of Ensign Olof Bergh in 1685

Captain of the Garrison
- In office circa 1695 – unknown
- Governor: Simon Van Der Stel

Personal details
- Born: 16 April 1643 Gothenburg, Sweden
- Died: 19 July 1725 (aged 81–82) Constantia, Cape Colony
- Spouse: Anna de Coningh
- Children: Twelve
- Parents: Tollev Olsen Bjørge (unconfirmed) (father); Marit Bjørge (unconfirmed) (mother)
- Employer: Dutch East India Company

Olof Bergh (sometimes spelled Olaf or Oloff Bergh) was an early Swedish-South African explorer and Cape Colony official as well as the progenitor of the well-known Bergh family in South Africa. He is also a former owner of South Africa's first wine estate "Groot Constantia" after Simon van der Stel. His accounts of his travels to the interior of the Cape Colony are among some of the first Dutch writings to originate on South African soil.

== Life and work ==
=== Birth and arrival in the Cape ===
Olof Martini Bergh was born on 16 April 1643. in Gothenburg in Sweden to Norwegian parents. Little is known about his pre-South African background; however, he appears to have been the youngest son from an aristocratic family of Swedish-Norwegian origin. At the age of 22, he entered the service of the Dutch East India Company in 1665. Bergh left Texel, Netherlands in the Netherlands on the ship Constantia on 8 October 1665, stopping briefly at the Cape on 26 February 1666 before travelling to Batavia (present day Jakarta), where he arrived on 25 May of the same year. He served in Batavia before moving to the Cape in 1676 where he continued his service with the Company. He married Anna de Coningh on 10 September 1678 in Cape Town, who herself had arrived in the Cape with her mother in 1657. When Simon van der Stel became governor in 1679 he was an ensign at the Cape.

Not much is known for certain about Anna's early life, as meticulous records were not kept on individual slaves. It is known that her mother was Angela van Bengale, who had been brought to the Cape as one of the earliest known slaves, presumably from the Ganges Delta (as indicated by her name). Anna is presumed to have been born at the Cape around 1661 to a white father.[1] It is not known for certain who her father was, but a man named François de Koninck from Ghent (in modern day Belgium) was at the Cape around this time, and Anna's last name would suggest it might have been him

=== Expeditions and travel accounts ===
==== Early expeditions ====
Some of Bergh's earliest work at the Cape included leading bartering trips to the neighboring as well as to the more remote kraals such as those of the Hessequas, a Khoi tribe, in search of livestock and in particular cattle. In addition to these, one of the earliest accounts of Bergh's expeditions included leading a small party of colonists assembled to recapture and return to the Colony three men, who had escaped a few days earlier, which he did.

==== Later notable expeditions ====
In 1682, shortly before his scheduled trip to Vigiti Magna, Bergh was despatched instructed to investigate and retrieve any surviving treasures from the stranded English ship Johanna, which had was wrecked near Cape Agulhas on 8 June 1682. This ship had sunk beyond present day town of Hermanus, in the neighborhood of Gansbaai. After three months, Bergh returned with more than 28,000 guilders worth of treasure and a great deal of experience in conducting local expeditions. The details of this story named the "Landtocht na de Cape das Agulhas in den jare 1682" were recorded in the Company Day Register.

Six weeks later, on 30 October 1682, Bergh embarked on one of his most well-known expeditions, in which he was despatched by the then Governor of the Cape in search of the Nama and fabled "Copper Mountains" which had garnered significant attention of both the Cape officials and the VOC itself. He turned north and the details of this trip were again recorded, this time in "Die Journael van de landtocht gedaen by d'E Vaendrich Olof Bergh". During this expedition, Bergh and two other members of his group inscribed their names on the face of a rock near the site of a spring (later to become known as "Berghfontein", and designated as a former South African National Monument) as well as discovered and spent the night in a large cave (later to become known as "Heerenlogement", and which was used subsequently by numerous later explorers, including Van Der Stel himself).

He returned to the Kasteel at the Cape on 19 December 1682 without any tangible results, although one success of his trip was an initial detailed mapping of this region of the Cape. Despite the failure of his own expedition, it has been noted that both Bergh's expedition as well as that of a previous explorer (Jonas de la Guerre, who set out in 1663), were instrumental in paving the way for the later successful trip of Governor Simon van der Stel's expedition in 1685, in which he successfully sampled copper-containing ore near the present day town of Springbok. As a result of his experience in 1682, van der Stel again chose Bergh to lead another expedition in 1683 to the Nama people, the people from the North who came to trade copper ore at the Castle. This journey is documented in "Rapport van den Vaendrich Olof Bergh op hare reyse na de Cralie van de Namaquas" (1683).

According to the Daily Register, in a journal kept by Hendrik Claudius ("Dagregister van de landtocht van de Caap de Goede Hoop, waren gedistineert naar de Tropikus Caprikornij"), Bergh also undertook a trip to North in search of the Tropic of Capricorn. On this journey, however, he did not progress much further than the Doornbosch River (now Green River) due to the great drought and the difficulty of the terrain he encountered.

=== Imprisonment and exile to Ceylon ===
In 1686, Bergh, who was now a high ranking member of Cape society and a close friend of Governor van der Stel, was named a member of the Political Council. In July 1686 Bergh was once again despatched in the direction of Cape Agulhas to search for the wreck of the Portuguese ship, Nostra Signora de los Milagnos, which had run aground and been abandoned and which Company officers had subsequently purchased. In addition to a group of Jesuit priests, onboard the ship had been three envoys from the King of Siam with gifts intended for Pedro, King of Portugal, Louis XIV of France, and Charles II of England. However, despite these valuables being on the ship at the time of departure, they were not accounted for at the wreck nor among the items returned at the conclusion of the expedition. Later, when Bergh was supervising the construction of the Council House in Stellenbosch in 1687, rumors began to circulate that items had been stolen from the Portuguese wreck during the previous expedition. Bergh was subsequently arrested and imprisoned at the Castle. After a month in custody, he pleaded guilty on 5 May 1687 and the valuables, including two golden pears and a flask of musk, were found buried in his garden. Bergh was subsequently banished to Robben Island, the place of great terror for both black and white criminals during Company times. The following month, when a fleet of enemy French vessels sailed into Table Mountain, he was briefly returned to the mainland, but was returned to the island after the fleet's departure a short time later. Sometime later, in September 1690 he was released into the supervision of the Council of Seventeen (Here Sewentien).

Upon his release, because of his previous notable service to the Company, Bergh was given the option to retain his rank and leave the Cape immediately and take up duties at the Company station in Dutch Ceylon (currently Sri Lanka), or be remain at the Cape but be discharged from the Company and continue as a Freeburgher. Bergh chose the former and left for Ceylon shortly thereafter on 29 December 1690 (without his wife) on the ship Pampus, where he remained for five years until 1695 before being allowed to return to the Cape, once the scandal of his previous conviction had dissipated amidst the Burghers.

=== Later life ===
Soon after his return the Cape, it appears Bergh's previous conviction was not held against him and he was appointed Captain of the Garrison by the Governor and took up residence in a grand home on the Heerengracht (currently Adderleystraat) next to the church. In 1698, Bergh was granted the farm Groot Phesantekraal near present day Durbanville, whose flagship wine is named after his wife Anna. In 1701 he bought the farm De Kuilen (today's Kuils River) as well as the adjacent farm Saxenberg. He was again nominated as a member of the Political Council in 1697, 1699 and again in 1709 and 1710 was honored with a seat on the Council of Justice, when the new Governor, Willem Adriaan van der Stel, was facing various difficulties (including the attempted suicide of his wife Maria, who was saved by apparent intervention of Bergh's wife Anna). In addition to his home on the Heerengracht, Bergh was also the first owner of the farm De Hoop, located close to the town (on the site of present day Gardens), the remaining buildings of which still exist today and are operated as historic luxury accommodation as well as two bungalows in Piquetberg.

After his retirement, Bergh bought the historic farm Groot Constantia from the estate of Simon van der Stel where he lived with his wife until his death. With his wife Anna, he fathered no less than twelve children, including Christina (1679), Maria (1682), Petrus (1684), Appolonia Africana (1686), Carolus Erlandt (1689), Johanna Magdalena (1691), Dorothea Francina (1695), Marthinus (1696), Simon Petrus (1696), Engela (1700) and Albertus (1702). He died on 19 July 1725 in Cape Town.

== Legacy ==
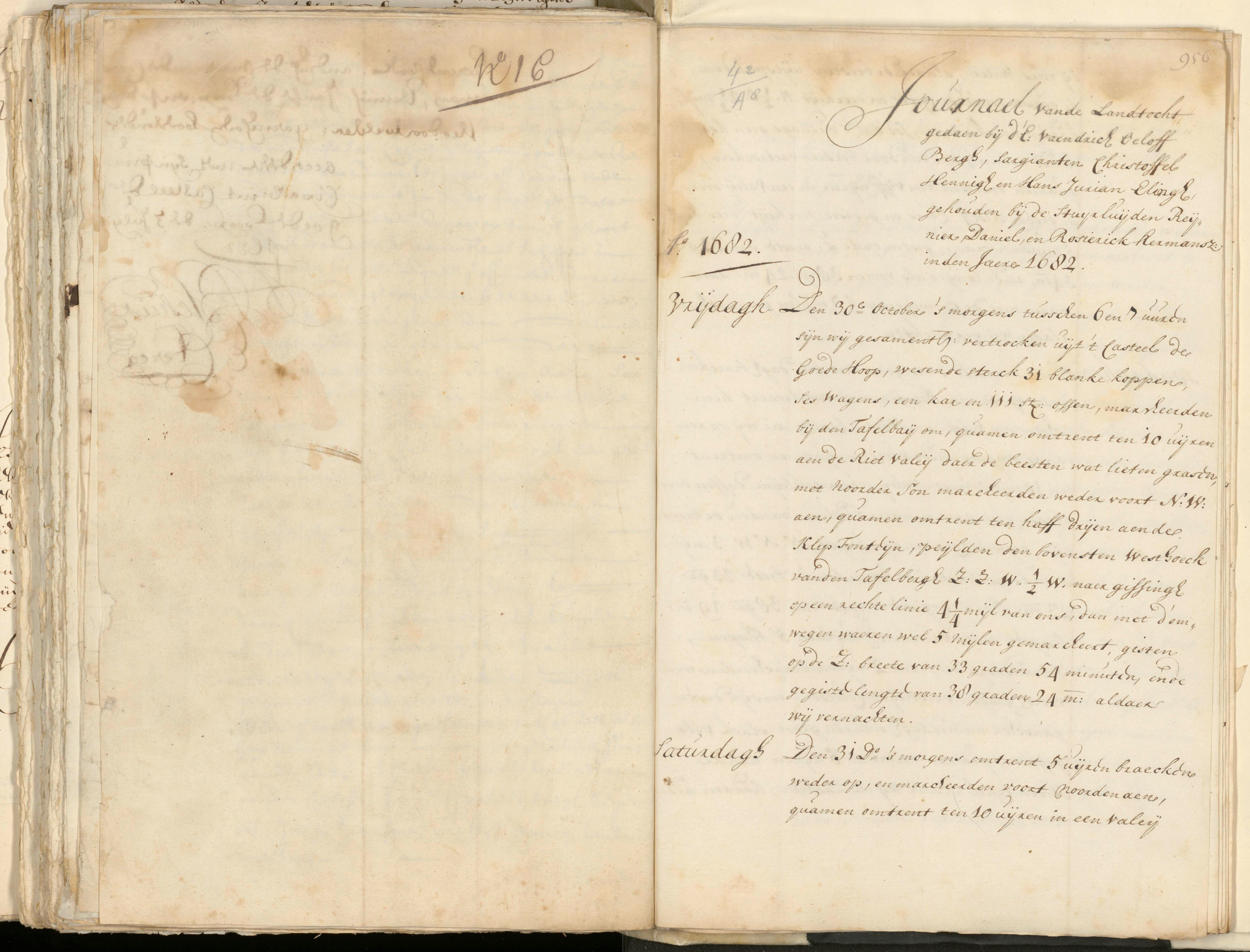
Excerpt of Bergh's journal of his journey to the Nama, 1682

=== Historical and cultural ===
As a result of his various activities at the Cape as well as being one of the earliest European explorers of the Northern Cape, Bergh has become a well known member of early Cape Dutch history and lends his name to a number of cultural as well as official sites, including:

- Olof Bergh Branderwyn, a popular awarding winning South African brandy as well as South Africa's first Solera style brandy distilled at the Olof Bergh Cellers near the Worcester in the Western Cape. Although Bergh was reportedly not very interested in wine-making, he is credited with introducing the solera method of storing and fortifying wines to South Africa.
- The Chenin Blanc wine "Anna de Koning" produced on the farm Groot Phesantekraal is named after his wife Anna
- Olof Bergh Pass, a mountain pass in the Western Cape Province of South Africa connecting the towns of Redelinghuys and Aurora
- Berghfontein (also known as Olaff Bergh Fontein or Olof Bergh klip), a large rock and adjacent spring on which Bergh inscribed his name during his expedition north from the Cape Colony in 1682 in search of the so-called Copper Mountains and Nama people. The site was formerly designated a South African National Monument but re-designated a Western Cape Provincial Heritage Site in April 2000 under Section 27 of the National Heritage Resources Act (NHRA) of South Africa. The site became a popular stopping place for later early colonial travellers, including Simon Van Der Stel, who in 1685 made his own expedition in search of copper and trade with the Nama, stopped there on 14 September 1685
- Bergh is also credited to have named the small mountain outcrock in which the famous cave known as Heerenlogement ("Gentleman's Lodging") Cave is found as Dassenberg, although later came to be known more famously as Heerenlogementberg. Bergh is credited as the first European to use the cave as logdgement which was later famously used by numerous early explorers, botanists and naturalists, including van der Stel, many of whom appear to have followed Bergh's early example at Berghfontein and inscribed their names in the cave.
- OM Bergh Huis, a house within the Stellenbosch Village Museum and the former home of Olof Martinus Bergh, a direct descendent of Olof Bergh
- Along with his wife Anna, Bergh was the second owner of South Africa's oldest wine estate "Groot Constantia" which he purchased after the division of the former estate (Constantia) into three parts following the death of Simon Van Der Stel. A number of Bergh and his wife's possessions (including portraits of Bergh and Anna as well as their furniture) remain part of the estate, which is also a former South African National Monument and current Western Cape Provincial Heritage Site.
- Many of the historical details of Bergh's life at the Cape have been recorded in the book "Rogues to Riches - The Fortunes of Olof Bergh and the Van Der Stels" as well as the Swedish biographical reference series "Svenska Män ock Kvinnor" (also known as "SMoK"), while a romanticised version of his life has been novelised from the perspective of his wife Anna in the novel "Kites of Good Fortune - The Story of Anna de Koningh"

Several of Bergh's journals as well as missives have been preserved as part of the Dutch East India Company archives which have subsequently preserved as part of the United Nations UNESCO Silk Roads project

=== Development of the Afrikaans language ===
Through the diaries of his travels (which were among some of the first Dutch writings to originate from the Cape within which it was already evident how these early writers had begun to evolve the Dutch language to deal with the unique circumstances and living habits of the colonists), Bergh is considered like many other early Colonists to have made an important contribution to the early development of the Afrikaans language.

For example, Bergh appears to have been the first to record the phrase "bosjesmans" (later translated to "bushmen") when referring to the local indigenous people he came into contact with on his travels North from the Cape as well as "Afrijkaenders" (referring to local European Colonists of Dutch heritage) as early as September 1683.
