= Louis van Assenburgh =

Dutch colonial governor

3rd Governor of the Dutch Cape Colony
- In office 1 February 1708 – 27 December 1711
- Preceded by: Johan Cornelis d'Ableing (acting)
- Succeeded by: Willem Helot (acting)

Personal details
- Born: c. 1657 Amsterdam, Dutch Republic
- Died: 27 December 1711 Cape Town

Louis van Assenburgh (also Assenborch, Assenburg), (c. 1657 – 27 December 1711), Governor of the Cape Colony between 1708 and 1711.

== Early life ==
Van Assenburgh was the son of Pieter van Assenburgh and his wife, Susanna Houwens and was baptized on 23 December 1657 in the Westerkerk, Amsterdam. Before he joined the VOC, Van Assenburgh served under the 'Kaiser of the Donou'.

== Career ==
Van Assenbugh was appointed as successor to Governor W. A. van der Stel and he left the Netherlands on 19 May 1707. As the ship sailed via Brazil, he only reached the Cape only 25 January 1708 and on 1 February he was introduced to the inhabitants of Cape by the secunde and acting governor, Johan Cornelis d'Ableing.

At the beginning of his term as governor, Van Assenburgh had the difficult task of appeasing the anger of the dissatisfied burghers caused by the revolt and dismissal of W. A. van der Stel and he had to ensure that the people adhere to the commands of the Lords XVII (Heren XVII). Among other things, he dealt with disputes between burghers and officials, stopped smuggling, introduced new licensing conditions for auctions and made improvements in the care of the sick. The people of the Cape were generally satisfied with his actions.

However, the former governor-general, Joan van Hoorn, who visited the Cape in 1710, criticized Van Assenburgh's rule in a letter addressed to his father-in-law, Abraham van Riebeeck. Van Hoorn accused Van Assenburgh, who was unmarried, of consorting with women of ill repute, being fond of frivolous entertainments and that the Cape had a general air of neglect. Although Van Assenburgh was accused of indecisive and improper conduct, it was because of his efforts that the Cape burghers became reconciled once again to the authority of the VOC.

== Death ==
Van Assenburgh was bed-ridden for eight months before his death. He signed his last will and testament exactly a month before he died on 27 December 1711.

== See also ==
- 1700s in South Africa
- 1710s in South Africa
