= Illicit trade =

Trade in goods or services deemed illegal

Illicit trade is the production or distribution of a good or service that is considered illegal by a legislature. It includes trade that is strictly illegal in different jurisdictions, as well as trade that is illegal in some jurisdictions but legal in others.

Illicit trade can occur either in black markets or in legitimate markets. Some of the most important types of illicit trade include various forms of smuggling, the illegal drug trade, counterfeiting, human trafficking, the illicit tobacco trade, arms trafficking, illicit trafficking of cultural property, and various environmental crimes such as illegal wildlife trade, illegal logging and illegal fishing.

== International initiatives to combat illicit trade ==
While there are several international treaties for dealing with specific types of illicit trade, it is said that a cross-sector approach as well as increased collaboration and communication between stakeholders are necessary to address illicit trade more efficiently.

In 2013, the OECD launched a Task Force Countering on Illicit Trade, which focuses on developing evidence-based research and coordinating international expertise in quantifying and mapping illicit markets.

Since 2013, The World Customs Organization produces a yearly report on illicit trade which uses seizure data and case studies to study illicit trade flows.

In February 2020, UNCTAD held a Forum on illicit trade. One of the main focus of the event was to evaluate how illicit trade impacts negatively the Sustainable Development Goals.

According to the Global Initiative Against Transnational Organized Crime and to Tradeslab, not only the World Trade Organization has rather limited tools to deal with illicit trade, but it may also limit the ability of states to combat it.

== Measurements on illicit trade ==
By considering 12 different illicit markets, Global Financial Integrity estimated the value of illicit trade at $650 billion in 2011.

The UNODC estimated in 2012 that the illicit trade activities of transnational organized crime have a combined annual value of $870 billion per year.

The Economist Intelligence Unit developed in 2018 a Global Illicit Trade Index, which evaluates the structural capacities of 84 countries to fight illicit trade.

== Debates and controversies ==
Several authors and organizations assert that globalization has led to a significant increase of illicit trade, and that it has become a significant global threat. However, some authors argue that illicit trade has not necessarily grown in proportion to licit trade, and that a historical perspective is missing in the current assessment of its importance.
