= Simonsberg =

Mountain in Western Cape, South Africa

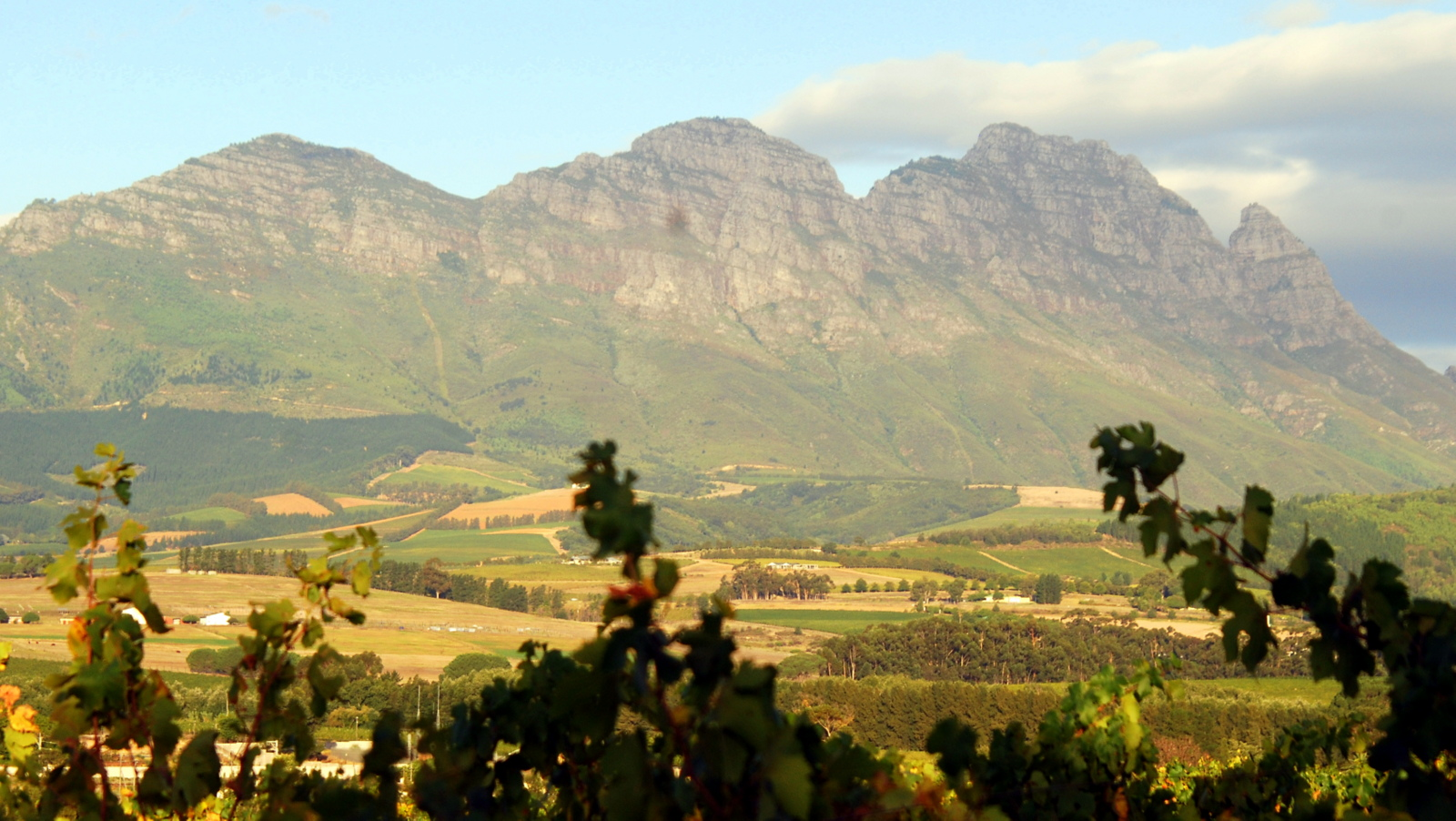

Highest point
- Elevation: 1,390 m (4,560 ft)
- Prominence: 1,011 m (3,317 ft)
- Listing: Ribu
- Coordinates: 34°01′S 19°03′E

Naming
- Etymology: Named after the first governor of the Cape Colony, Simon van der Stel

Geography
- Location within South Africa
- Country: South Africa
- State: Western Cape
- Settlement: Stellenbosch

Simonsberg (English: Simon's Mountain) is part of the Cape Fold Belt in the Western Cape province of South Africa. It is located between the towns of Stellenbosch, Paarl and Franschhoek, forming a prominent 1390 m high mountain, as it is detached from the other ranges in the winelands region. A hiking trail leads to the summit, as well as to one of the other peaks. The trail is accessible from a neighbouring wine farm.

Simonsberg is named after Simon van der Stel, first governor of the Cape and founder and namesake of Stellenbosch and Simon's Town. The mountain has 7 caves as part of a mining project for silver.
