= Adam Tas =

Cape Colony community leader (1668–1722)

Adam Tas (1668 – June 1722) was a community leader in the Cape Colony at the turn of the 17th century, and is best known for his role in the conflict between Cape Governor Willem Adriaan van der Stel (son of the former Governor Simon van der Stel) and the Free Burghers at the Cape of Good Hope.

== Overview ==
Adam Tas (pronounced "Ah-dum Tuss") was born in Amsterdam, the Netherlands. One of his aunts and her German husband, Henning Hüsing, came to the Cape in search of fortune. When he was 29 (1697), Tas joined them and stayed at Meerlust, their Stellenbosch home. Two years later he was appointed Standard Bearer to the Burgher Infantry. In June, 1703 he married Elizabeth Von Brakel, the wealthy widow of Joris (Hans Jürgen) Grimpen, who owned a collection of farms in the district.

Tas became secretary of the "Brotherhood", which viewed the Dutch East India Company (VOC) administration at the Cape as corrupt and dictatorial. Like other senior VOC officials, the governor, Willem Adriaan van der Stel also owned a farm, Vergelegen. These VOC officials soon started a corrupt trading monopoly with the VOC which seriously hampered the free burghers' ability to make a living. By 1705, a third of all the farms in the colony belonged to just 20 officials. Tas and Hüsing drafted a petition, accusing local VOC officials of abusing the company's trading monopoly, and complained about how the Tas and Hüsing managed to persuade 63 of the 550 Cape free burghers to sign it. Without informing the local officials, the signed petition was given on 4 April 1706 to the doctor and poet Abraham Bogaert with instructions to deliver the petition directly to the VOC headquarters in Amsterdam. Abraham Bogaert was on a return voyage from Batavia to the Netherlands.

Before the petition was rejected, Van der Stel became aware of its existence. Tas was arrested on 28 February 1706, escorted in chains to Cape Town, and convicted. A counter-petition was prepared and signed by 240 of the 550 Cape free burghers, wherein they defended Van Der Stel's policies and denied Adam Tas' allegations. In retaliation, Adam Tas and 15 other free burghers (most of whom were of Huguenot descent and residing at Drakenstein) accused VOC officials of allowing the rights of Christian "Caffers, Moulattos, Mestiços, Castiços and all the black breed living among us" to be equal to the rights Christian Europeans and that the counter-petition was invalid because many of the freeburgers who had signed it were 'untrustworthy' because of their 'Cham blood'. Van der Stel had parts of Tas's diary copied (13 June 1705 through 27 February 1706) as evidence. (Large fragments of this copy was rediscovered in 1911 by A.C.C. Lloyd, a librarian at the National Library of South Africa) After he was convicted, Tas was thrown in the "Black Hole" – a damp dungeon completely devoid of any light located in the Castle of Good Hope.

However, since 31 of the signatories of the original petition against Van Der Stel were Huguenots, and because the Netherlands was at war with France, the rejected petition generated belated concern in Amsterdam. The fear was that the discontent might convince some to become spies for the French. The VOC dismissed van der Stel, and ordered his return to the Netherlands (23 April 1707). VOC officials were subsequently forbidden to own any land at the Cape of Good Hope.

Thirteen months into his incarceration Tas was released. Upon gaining his freedom, Tas named his home "Libertas" (Latin: freedom) in honor of the occasion, and allocated a new meaning ("Tas is Free!") to the name. The property, located on the outskirts of Stellenbosch is currently part of a strawberry farming operation. It includes a homestead extended by a later owner with the date of 1771 on the Cape Dutch gable.

== See also ==
- 1700s in South Africa
- History of Cape Colony
