= Uys =

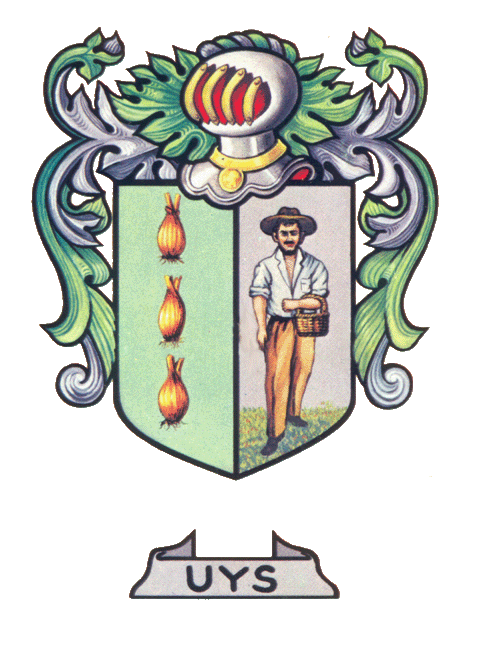
The arms that have come to be used by members of the Uys family.

Uys is the surname of a family that played a significant role in South African history during the nineteenth century and made distinguished contributions to South African culture, politics and sports during the course of the twentieth.

== Origins ==
The earliest existing records show the Uys family living in Leiden and Amsterdam in the Netherlands.

The mother of the family's South African progenitor, Daentie Rycken (1645/46 – Stellenbosch 1725), was the first to arrive at the Cape in 1677 with her second husband, Jan Hendriksz de Lange (died Cape of Good Hope before June 1690). She briefly travelled to the Netherlands in 1697 with her third husband, Dirk Mol (died Stellenbosch 1731), and returned to the Cape in 1699 accompanied by her adult son, Cornelis Jansz Uys (Amsterdam 1671 – Cape of Good Hope c. 1716). Shortly thereafter, in 1704, Daentie settled on the farm By Den Weg in the Stellenbosch Kloof where she lived until her death in 1725.

Cornelis Jansz Uys was the only child from Daentie Rycken's first marriage to the maritime carpenter Jan Cornelisz (Uys) (1641/42 – died Newcastle upon Tyne c. 1674). Cornelis was accompanied to the Cape by his wife, Dirkje Matthysdr (van) Westerhout (Leiden 1673 – Cape of Good Hope 1714), the niece of his mother's third husband. The couple established themselves in the heart of the Cape settlement on modern-day Strand Street.

In 1722 their only son, Dirk Cornelisz Uys (born Leiden 1698 – died Stellenbosch 1758), settled on the farm Groote Zalze in Stellenbosch, where he married Dina le Roux (Stellenbosch 1702 – Stellenbosch 1740), who was of Norman Huguenot descent, and played a distinguished role in the local community as farmer, deacon, elder, burgher officer and alderman. Dirk was also one of the first European pioneers in the Overberg area of the Cape. The Uys family of southern Africa descend from this couple's three sons.

Two of the sons of Dirk Cornelisz Uys moved further into the interior of the Cape during the mid eighteenth century; their progeny played a notable role in the history of the colony and enjoyed fame as a distinguished and progressive frontier dynasty. The family also played a major role in the governance of the Dutch Republics in South Africa.

== Onomastics ==
=== Surname ===
Genealogists have speculated that the name could be a variation of the French name de Louis or related to the Scottish island of Uist or perhaps a variation of the German name Husse. Reliable records do not exist to confirm any of these theories.

=== First names and nicknames ===
The Uys surname can also be used as a first name (generally in reference to an Uys descent through the distaff side), as is the case with the poet, writer and adventurer Uys Krige. A character in the novel Het Beloofde Land by Dutch author Adriaan van Dis also has this first name.

== Arms ==
The arms of the Uys family are blazoned as:

Party per pale, in dexter vert three onions or in pale, in sinister argent a farmer standing on a stretch of grass holding a basket under his right arm proper.

These canting arms appear similar to those of the Van Uye family of Zeeland, to whom the Uys family are not related. The Uys arms are differenced from the Van Uye arms by the basket which the farmer holds; in the Van Uye arms the farmer is holding a bunch of onions (French: "une glane d'oignons"). The onions (Dutch: ui) in the dexter half of the arms are a canting reference to the Uys family name.

These arms were presented to the Dutch-South African heraldist and genealogist Cornelis Pama in 1960 by J.W. Prinsloo née Uys who informed him that they had been found in old family documents. Pama subsequently recorded these arms in his genealogical publications which led to their widespread dissemination and use by members of the Uys family. The Rootenberg family who descend from an extra-marital branch of the Kapkamma Uyses also have a canting reference to onions in their arms.

== Legacy ==
=== Monuments and museums ===
- Bible Monument, Grahamstown; monument commemorating the presentation of a large Dutch bible by Thomas Philipps and the British settlers of Grahamstown to Jacobus Johannes Uys (1770–1838) and the Uys trek party prior to their departure from the Cape Colony on the Great Trek in April 1837; the monument was unveiled by State President C.R. Swart of South Africa in 1962
- Ou Pastorie Museum, Utrecht; museum on the history of Utrecht and the surrounding area that contains multiple objects and references relating to the Uys family
- Uys House, Utrecht; home of the Uys family built by "Swart" Dirk Uys (1814–1910) in 1855; the house is one of the oldest houses north of the Tugela River in KwaZulu-Natal; it is the location where the Prince Imperial, Louis Napoleon, courted Swart Dirk's daughter, Sannie Uys; the house is a National Monument
- Uys Memorial, Dirk Uys Kraal, near Quoin Point, Overberg; memorial marking the site where Dirk Cornelisz Uys (1698–1758) was granted permission to graze his livestock as one of the first European pioneers in the Overberg
- Uys Monument, Utrecht; erected in honour of Commandant Petrus Lafras Uys (1827–1879) by the burghers of Utrecht, Sir Evelyn Wood and the British officers who fought alongside Uys during the course of the Anglo-Zulu War; the monument is in the shape of an obelisk with plaques in Dutch and English; the English text reads: To the memory of Petrus Lafras Uys, Commandant of the Burgher Force in the Zulu War of 1879, who fell whilst fighting on the Hlobani March 28th. This monument is erected by his fellow burghers of the town and district of Utrecht and the officers and men of the flying column under the command of General Wood with whom he served. A token of their admiration and respect.
- Uysklip, National Museum, Bloemfontein; a stone with the inscription "1837 Kerkspruijt" followed by the name of Jacobus Johannes Uys (1770–1838) that was left at the site of the Uys camp along the Modder River near Thaba 'Nchu to commemorate the fact that the Uys trek party had built a mud and daub church and requested the Wesleyan missionary, James Archbell, to officiate at the first Holy Communion held by the Voortrekkers north of the Orange River; the stone is currently part of the collection of the National Museum in Bloemfontein
- Voortrekker Monument, Pretoria; the monument contains a series of marble friezes in the central hall depicting key events from the Great Trek, including the presentation of the Uys Bible by the British settlers of Grahamstown to Jacobus Johannes Uys as well as a scene of Dirkie Uys (1823–1838) defending his dying father, Piet Uys (1797–1838), at the Battle of Italeni; the Uys Bible is part of the collection of the Monument's museum
- Voortrekker Monument, Winburg; a five-tiered monument on the outskirts of Winburg that carries the names of the principal Voortrekker leaders: Piet Uys, Andries Hendrik Potgieter, Andries Pretorius, Piet Retief and Gerrit Maritz; the lengths of the five tiers are proportional to the distances travelled by each of the respective Voortrekker parties; on the Day of the Vow (16 December) the sun passes directly over the monument and a plaque with a Christian religious message at the base is illuminated; the monument is built near the site of the birth-house of Martinus Theunis Steyn, who was president of the Boer Republic of the Orange Free State
- Voortrekker / Msunduzi Museum, Pietermaritzburg; the collection of the museum contains a wide variety of historical objects relating to the Great Trek that once belonged to the Uys family

=== Locations ===
- Uysberg, Free State; mountain on the South African border with Lesotho, south-south-east of Clocolan and north-east of Ladybrand
- Uysklip, Free State, railway station south-east of Bloemfontein on the line between Dewetsdorp and Sannaspos; the station is close to the site baptised as Kerkspruijt by the Uys trek party in 1837; the neighbouring mountain is also known as Uysklip
- Uyskop, KwaZulu-Natal; mountain (1827 meters altitude) on the south-eastern outskirts of Utrecht
- Wakkerstroom, KwaZulu-Natal, formerly part of the South African Republic; the plans for the town were surveyed with an eland hide rope in 1859 by "Swart" Dirk Uys (1814–1910) who called the settlement Uysenburg; the town was subsequently renamed Marthinus Wesselstroom, and is today known as Wakkerstroom

=== Miscellaneous ===
- A race of cattle that was bred by the Voortrekker Uys family in northern KwaZulu-Natal came to be known as the Uysbees (Uys cattle); in 1947 the name of the breed was changed to Drakensberger.

== Notable family members ==
=== Arts and humanities ===
- Amalia Uys (born 1984), South African actor in the soap opera 7de Laan
- Jamie Uys (1921–1996), South African film director (born as Jacobus Johannes Uys)
- Pieter-Dirk Uys (born 1945), South African satirist, active as a performer, author, and social activist
- Sannie "Pikkie" Uys, actress
- Uys Krige (christened Mattheus Uys Krige) (1910–1987), son of Sannie Uys, South African writer, poet, playwright, translator, rugby player, war correspondent and romantic
- Stanley Uys (1922–2014), South African and English journalist

=== Military ===
- Dirkie Uys (1823–1838), young Voortrekker hero during the Great Trek, his death is commemorated with a frieze in the Voortrekker Monument in Pretoria
- Piet Uys (1797– Battle of Italeni 1838), Voortrekker leader during the Great Trek, he is commemorated with a frieze depicting his death in the Voortrekker Monument in Pretoria

=== Politics and administration ===
- Johann Kunz Uys (1907–1978), South African diplomat and ambassador to West-Germany
- Juan-Duval Uys, controversial politician, former leader of the Gay and Lesbian Alliance, co-founder of the revived National Party South Africa in 2008

=== Sports ===
- Antoinette Uys (born 1976), female badminton player from South Africa
- BG (Burrie Gildenhuys) Uys (born 1988), South African rugby union player
- Jan (Jan-Frederik) Uys (born 1994), South African rugby union player
- Francois Uys (born 1986), South African rugby union player
- Ronnie Uys (born 1979), South African rugby union player

== Sources ==
- Binckes, Robin, The Great Trek Uncut, 30 Degree South Publishers, Pinetown 2013.
- Brookes, E.H, and Webb, C. de B., A History of Natal, University of Natal, Pietermaritzburg 1987 (2nd edition). ISBN 0-86980-579-7
- Cilliers, Ben, Genealogieë van die Afrikaner Families in Natal, Mosselbaai 1985; pp. 608–614.
- Endeman, L.C.P (Editor), South African Genealogies – Suid Afrikaanse Geslagregisters, Volume 13 (T-U), Genealogical Institute of South Africa, Stellenbosch 2006; pp. 488–527. ISBN 0-7972-1086-5
- Hopkins, Ds. H.C., "Die Stamouers van die Familie Uys" in Familia, Quarterly Journal of the Genealogical Society of South Africa, Year 1979, pp. 28–31.
- Houte de Lange, C.E.G. ten, (Editor), Nederland's Wapenboek – Deel 1, Koninklijk Nederlandsch Genootschap voor Geslachts- en Wapenkunde, 's-Gravenhage 1998; pp. 184–185. ISBN 90-800382-7-X
- Lehmann, Joseph, The First Boer War, Jonathan Cape, London 1972.
- Morris, Donald R., The Washing of the Spears, The Rise and Fall of the Zulu Nation, Jonathan Cape, London 1965.
- Muller, C.F.J., "Die arrestasie van Mev. Piet Uys op Sondag 25 Oktober 1835, in Historia, Amptelike Orgaan van die Historiese Genootskap van Suid-Afrika, Year 1972, pp. 244–264.
- Muller, C.F.J., "Die wording van Piet Uys as Voortrekkerleier" in Leiers na die Noorde, Studies oor die Groot Trek, Tafelberg, Kaapstad 1976 (pp. 108–129). ISBN 0-624-00725-1
- Muller, C.F.J., Die Oorsprong van die Groot Trek, Universiteit van Pretoria, Pretoria 1987 (2nd Edition). ISBN 0-86981-519-9
- Preller, Gustav S., "Geskiedenis van die Uijs Kommissie" and "Losse Mededelingen van Z.J. Uijs" in Voortrekkermense, 'n Vijftal oorspronkelike Dokumente oor die Geskiedenis van die Voortrek, De Nasionale Pers, Kaapstad 1918; pp. 275–296.
- Prinsloo, J.W., "Geskiedenis van die Voortrekker Uys-Familie" in Historia, Amptelike Orgaan van die Historiese Genootskap van Suid-Afrika, Year 1968, pp. 33–35.
- Theal, George McCall, "Chronicles of two leaders of the Great Emigration, Louis Triegard and Pieter Uys" and "Pieter Lavras Uys" in Willem Adriaan van der Stel and other historical sketches, Thomas Maskew Miller, Cape Town 1913.
- Redelinghuys. J.H., Die Afrikaner Familienaamboek, Publisitas, Kaapstad 1954.
- Robbertze, F.P. du P., Die Sterfplek van Dirkie Uys, Pietersburg 1983. ISBN 0-620-06715-2
- Rootenberg, Francesco Uys, "The Origins of the Uys Family in the Netherlands" in Familia, Quarterly Journal of the Genealogical Society of South Africa, Year 1997, volume 4; pp. 144–151.
- Rootenberg, Francesco Uys, "The Life and Times of Daentie Rijcken, the Remarkable Uys Stammoeder" in Familia, Quarterly Journal of the Genealogical Society of South Africa, Year 2016, volume 1; pp. 29–52.
- Rosenthal, Eric, South African Surnames, Howard Timmins, Cape Town 1965; pp. 146–148 ("The Uyses").
- Saul, David, Zulu, The Heroism and Tragedy of the Zulu War of 1879, Penguin, London 2004.
- Uys, Ian S., Die Uys Geskiedenis, Heidelberg 1974. ISBN 0-620-01365-6
- Uys, Ian S., "A Boer Family" in Military History Journal (South African Military History Society), Vol 3. No. 6, December 1976.
- Uys, Ian, South African Military Who's Who, 1452–1992, Fortress Publishers, Germiston 1992. ISBN 0-9583173-3-X
- Uys, Ian, Rearguard, The Life and Times of Piet Uys, Fortress Publishers, Kynsna 1998. ISBN 0-620-23191-2
- Uys, Dr. J.F. (Frikkie), "Die Eerste Uys" in Familia, Quarterly Journal of the Genealogical Society of South Africa, Year 2011, volume 1; pp. 26–34.
- Uys, Dr. J.F. (Frikkie), "Die Eerste Uys – Deel 2" in Familia, Quarterly Journal of the Genealogical Society of South Africa, Year 2013, Parts 2 & 3, pp. 143–144.
- Uys, Dr. J.F. (Frikkie), "Die Eerste Uys – Deel 2: Nijs, 'n regstelling" in Familia, Quarterly Journal of the Genealogical Society of South Africa, Year 2013, Part 4, pp. 187–190.
- Uys, J.R., Uys Familie Register, Pinelands 1984.
- Uys, Petrus Lafras, and Uys, Dirk Cornelius, "Die Voortrekker Uys-Familie vanaf 1704", in Historia, Amptelike Orgaan van die Historiese Genootskap van Suid-Afrika, Year 1967, pp. 276–279.
- de Villiers, J.F.K., Uys Familie, Hersamestelling van die Uys Register van 1984 / The Uys Family, Rearrangement of the Uys Register of 1984, Gisborne (New Zealand) 2014.
- Visagie, Jan C., Voortrekkerstamouers 1835–1845, Protea Boekhuis, Pretoria 2011 (2nd edition), pp. 501–505. ISBN 978-1-86919-372-0
