= Johan Cornelis d'Ableing =

Acting Governor of the Dutch Cape Colony
- In office 3 June 1707 – 1 February 1708
- Preceded by: Willem Adriaan van der Stel
- Succeeded by: Louis van Assenburgh

Personal details
- Born: 20 November 1663 Haarlem
- Died: 21 May 1721 (aged 57) Batavia
- Resting place: Weltevreden, Batavia
- Spouse(s): Louise Soury; Adriana Wilhelmina Burlamacchi

Johan Cornelis d'Ableing (also spelled Joan, Jan, d'Ablaing) (20 November 1663 – 21 May 1721), was secunde and acting governor at the Cape.

== Career ==
D'Ableing joined the VOC as assistant with the chamber of Amsterdam and departed for Batavia on 9 February 1682 and in 1692 he was a junior merchant and cashier in the VOC's pay-office in Java. In 1694 he was promoted to the rank of merchant and in 1696 he became superintendent of the VOC's post at Palembang in South Sumatra. In October 1698, D'Ableing was summoned to Batavia because of private trade and in 1700 he was dismissed and repatriated to the Netherlands.

In 1706 he was re-admitted to the service of the VOC as a senior merchant and on 6 May 1707, D'Ableing arrived at the Cape as secunde (second in command). He served under his cousin, governor W. A. van der Stel, who on 16 April 1707 was notified of his dismissal and recalled to the Netherlands. Van der Stel was also informed that D'Ableing would act on his behalf pending the arrival of the next governor.

Louis van Assenburgh took over the administration on 1 February 1708 and D'Ableing continued as a senior merchant, secunde and chief administrator. Van Assenburgh and D'Ableing did not get along with each other and on 4 July 1710 D'Ableing resigned as secunde and left for Batavia where he was promoted to Councillor Extraordinary of India. He later was appointed president of the college of orphan-masters, and in 1720 became councillor of India.

== Personal ==
D'Ableing was the son of Joan Daniel d'Ablaing and Agatha Guldewagen. During his tenure at the Cape, D'Ableing always spelt his surname 'Ableing'. He was married twice, first to Louise Soury and after her death he married Adriana Wilhelmina Burlamacchi, on 22 December 1699 in Batavia. A son, Johan Daniel d'Ableing (or d'Ablaing), lord of Haulsin and Peursum, who accompanied his father to the Cape as a boy of five, became by marriage baron of Giessenburg, Giessen-Nieuwkerk and Cadzand. D'Ableing died on 21 May 1721 in Batavia.

== See also ==
- 1700s in South Africa
