= Drakenstein =

Mountain range in South Africa

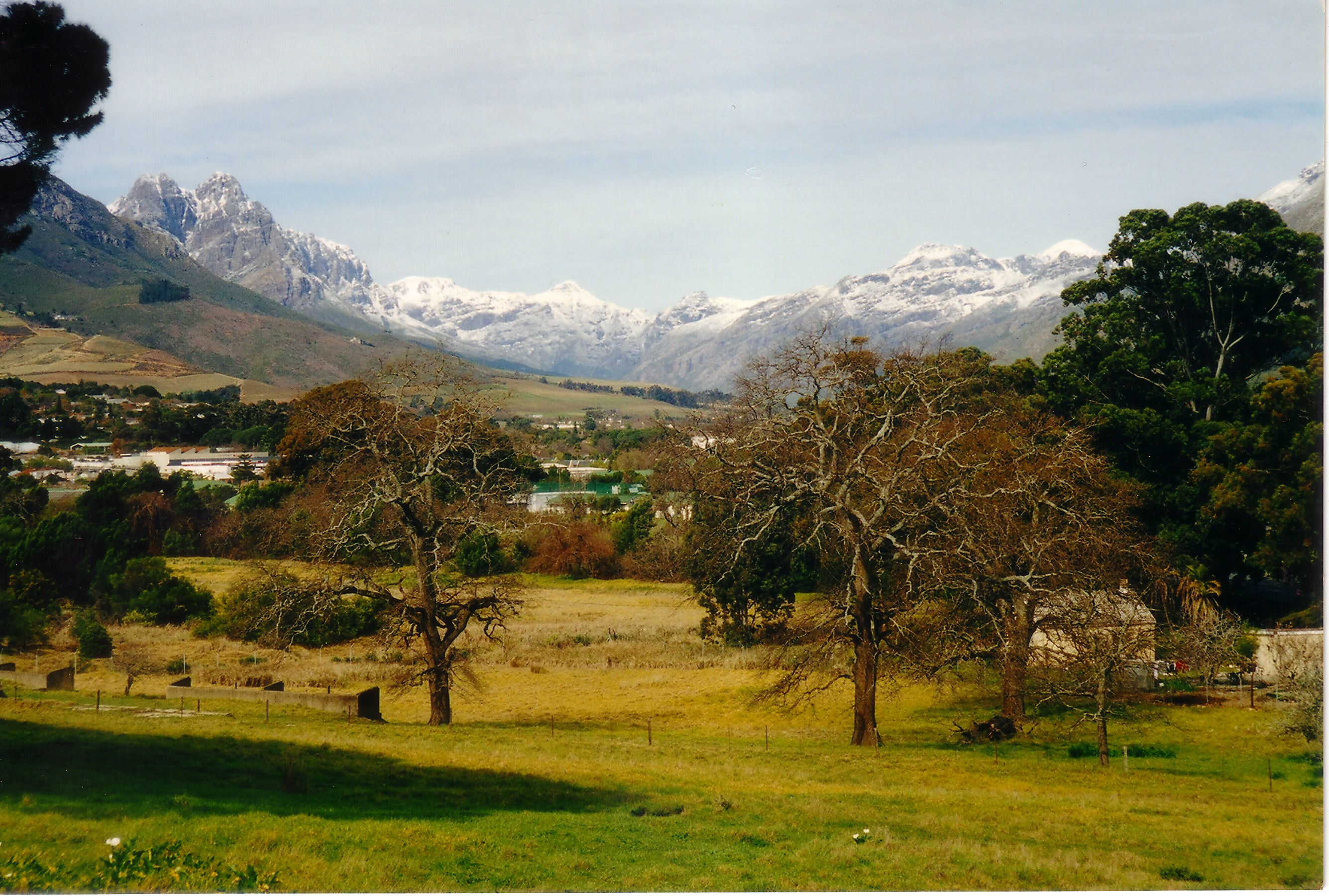
- Jonkershoek Valley and the Groot Drakenstein Mountains from Stellenbosch. Victoria Peak (1,590 m (5,220 ft)) is the heaviest snow-covered portion in the middle background

Highest point
- Peak: Victoria Peak
- Elevation: 1,590 m (5,220 ft)
- Listing: List of mountain ranges of South Africa
- Coordinates: 34°01′S 19°03′E

Geography
- Location within South Africa
- Country: South Africa

The Drakenstein mountain is a mountain range in the Western Cape province of South Africa. It lies opposite Simonsberg Mountain and is part of the Cape Fold Belt. It is named after ex-soldier Hendrik Adriaan van Rheede tot Drakenstein, who was Colonial administrator of the Dutch East India Company.

== History ==
Both the mountain and the Drakenstein Valley at its foot were named in honour of Hendrik who visited the Cape as Commissioner-General in 1685; Drakenstein (modern spelling usually Drakestein) was the name of his estate in the Netherlands.

== Geography ==
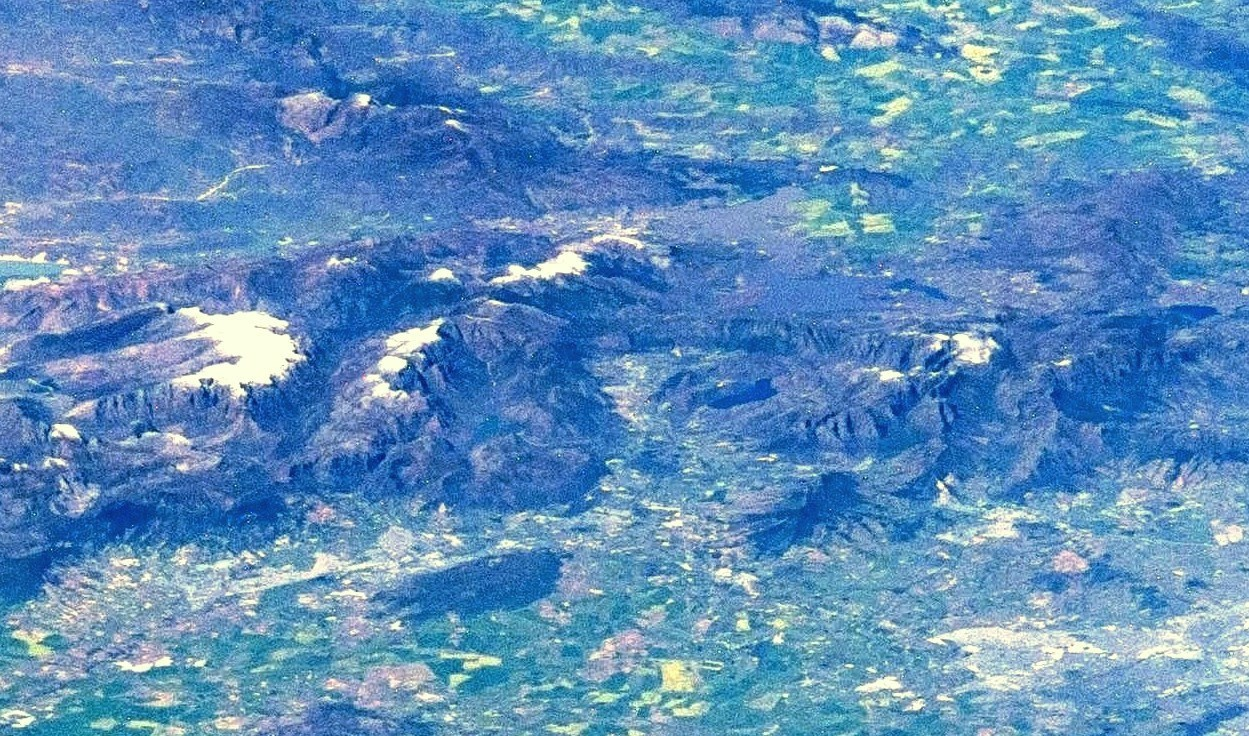
The snowcapped Drakenstein Range, and the Drakenstein Valley in its immediate foreground, seen from the International Space Station.

They actually comprise two separate ranges, the Klein Drakenstein and Groot Drakenstein Mountains. The former located just to the east of Paarl being punctuated by the Huguenot Tunnel on the N1 highway and Du Toitskloof Pass (820 m (2,690 ft)) as the R101 route. The latter is much taller and is located south of Franschhoek and Stellenbosch, with Victoria Peak (1,590 m (5,220 ft) as its highest point. It is traversed by no mountain passes, but contains the Hottentots-Holland Nature Reserve and also holds title of the wettest place in South Africa in the upper reaches of the Jonkershoek Nature Reserve, with over 2,000 millimetres (79 in) of precipitation per annum (precise measurement unverified), the reason for the Wemmershoek Dam to be built in this mountain.

Most vegetation is of the Cape Floral Kingdom biome, and the primary rocks are of the Table Mountain Sandstone group of the Cape Supergroup. The region falls within the Mediterranean climatic zone, with cool, wet winters, with snow on the higher elevations and warm, dry summers. The one peak facing Boschendal wine farm is named devils tooth for its big tooth look. British singer and songwriter Lily Allen shot the Air Balloon (song) at the foot of the mountain at an unused castle (perfect for movies, photography, in her case music videos). The mountain is mainly untouched yet there is footpaths crossing the baboon infested mountain, with an apex predator the Cape leopard roaming the mountains and surrounding farms. For the hiking enthusiasts a trail with camping cabins runs all the way to Hermanus.

== See also ==
- Wildlife of South Africa
- Southern Africa
