= Free Burghers in the Dutch Cape Colony =

18th century primarily Dutch settlers at the Cape of Good Hope

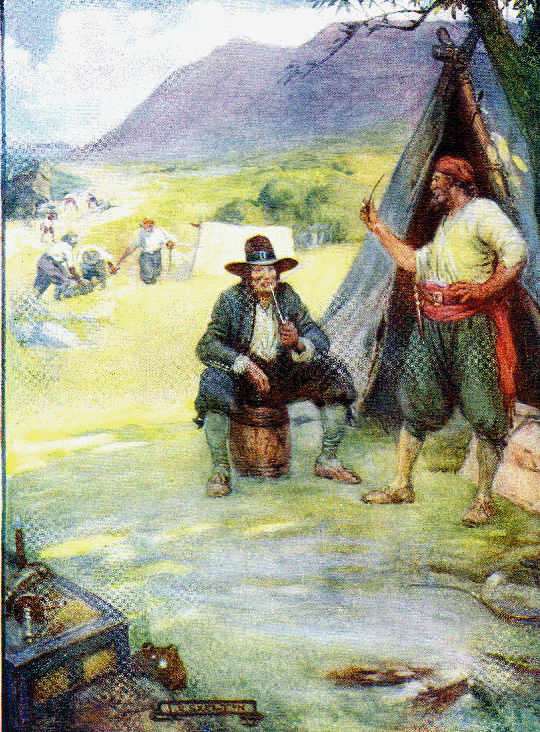
Cape free burghers depicted in a 1908 illustration by J. R. Skelton.

Free Burghers (Dutch: Vrijburger, Afrikaans: Vryburger) were primarily Dutch employees of the Dutch East India Company (VOC) who were released from company service in its overseas colonies and granted the rights of free citizens (burghers). The introduction of Free Burghers to the Dutch Cape Colony is regarded as the beginning of a permanent settlement of Europeans in Southern Africa. The Cape's Free Burgher population eventually devolved into two distinct segments separated by social status, wealth, and education: the Cape Dutch and the Boers.

== Settlement at the Cape ==
=== European workforce ===
Flag of the Dutch Republic or Prince's Flag was hoisted on the Castle of Good Hope and saluted by incoming ships

The Dutch East India Company (Vereenigde Oostindische Compagnie (VOC) in Dutch) had been formed in the Dutch Republic in 1602, and the Dutch entered into competition for commerce in Southeast Asia. The end of the Thirty Years' War in 1648 saw European soldiers and refugees widely dispersed across Europe. Immigrants from Germany, Scandinavia, and Switzerland journeyed to Holland in the hope of finding employment at the VOC. Beyond this, the Company filled its ranks with farm labourers, artisans and unskilled workers from both rural and urban areas who spoke a number of variations of French, Dutch, German and Scandinavian languages. Contractors were obliged to remain in the employment of the Company for a minimum of five years excluding the six months that the journey could have taken and were not permitted to return home during this time.

=== Protestant work ethic ===
The Protestant work ethic, the Calvinist work ethic or the Puritan work ethic (Note: Especially in the United States.) is a work ethic concept in theology, sociology, economics, and history that emphasizes that hard work, discipline and frugality are a result of a person's subscription to the values espoused by the Protestant faith, particularly Calvinism. One of the causes for the Dutch Golden Age is attributed to the migration of skilled craftsmen to the Dutch Republic of which Protestants were especially well-represented. Economists Ronald Findlay and Kevin H. O'Rourke attribute part of the Dutch ascendancy to its Protestant work ethic based on Calvinism, which promoted thrift and education. This contributed to "the lowest interest rates and the highest literacy rates in Europe. The abundance of capital made it possible to maintain an impressive stock of wealth, embodied not only in the large fleet but in the plentiful stocks of an array of commodities that were used to stabilize prices and take advantage of profit opportunities."

== The first freemen ==
In 1656, Commander Jan van Riebeeck considered the idea of freemen at the Cape, he was of the opinion that the cost of supplying housing and protection to such free households would be too great. The Directors of the VOC however, were in favour to establish freemen under favourable conditions. By the time van Riebeeck left the Cape in 1662 the population of the colony consisted of 35 free burghers, 180 slaves, 134 VOC officials, 15 women, and 22 children.

=== Harman’s Colony ===
On 21 February 1657, following an application process where the best applicants were selected, a party of five were allowed to select land which they could occupy and use as freemen. They chose an area about fifteen kilometres away from the Fort de Goede Hoop on the other side of the Liesbeek River. They were allowed to select a piece of land as long and broad as they wished, on condition that they were to remain on the other side of the river. The area of land which they occupied were named Amstel, or the Groene veld.

The Founders of Harman’s Colony in 1657
Name	City of Birth	Occupation
Herman Reemanjenne	Cologne	Marine
Jan Maartensz de Wacht	Vreeland	Marine
Jan van Passel	Geel	Soldier
Warnaar Cornelisz	Nunspeet	Boatman
Roelof Jansen	Dalen	Soldier

=== Stephen’s Colony ===
Another party of four selected a spot nearer to the fort next to the Liesbeek River at Rondebosch opposite the Groenevelt. The area which was allocated to the freemen of Stephen's Colony were named Hollandsche Tuin (English: Dutch Garden).

The Founders of Stephen's Colony in 1657
Name	City of Birth	Occupation
Steven Jansz Botma	Wageningen	Sailor
Hendrik Elbertz	Ossenbrugge	Cadet
Otto Jansen	Vreede	Soldier
Jacob Cornelisz	Rosendaal	Soldier

=== Free burgher status ===
On 19 February 1657, Commander Jan van Riebeeck travelled to a spot about 19 km to the flats behind Table Mountain to select a spot where a fort could be constructed to protect the lands which were to be cultivated. European workers on several occasions asked permission from the Commander of the Cape at the time, Van Riebeeck, to be discharged from the service of the VOC, in order to cultivate the lands. On 20 February, Van Riebeeck accompanied them to mark out their plots and draw up preliminary conditions.

Servants of the VOC could return to their homes in Europe after their term of service had been carried out. Yet some workers chose to be discharged from service earlier than their term in order to live permanently at the Cape. The families of the free burghers were then brought from Europe to South Africa. Others after serving their term of service at the VOC also decided to stay at the Cape rather than returning to Europe who also received free burgher status. After the founding of the two free burgher colonies in February 1657, many more requested to be discharged from the service of the VOC. Letters of freedom were not issued to everyone who applied. By 25 September, 20 applications had been received and only five of them were enrolled as freemen.

Some of the men received limited free burgher status with conditions favourable to both the VOC and the applicant. Limited in terms of the duration of term which the applicant would be allowed to maintain free burgher status. The duration of the five who were enrolled as free burghers in September 1657 is as follows:

Duration of Free Burgher Status granted in September 1657
Name	City of Birth	Occupation	Duration of Status
Hendrik Surwerden	Sarrewerden	Corporal	12 Years
Elbert Dirksz	Emmerich	Soldier	12 Years
Harmen Ernst	Utrecht	Boatman	3 Years
Cornelis Claesz	Utrecht	Boatman	6 Years
Hendrik Boom	Amsterdam	Master Gardener	Lifelong

=== Settlement map ===
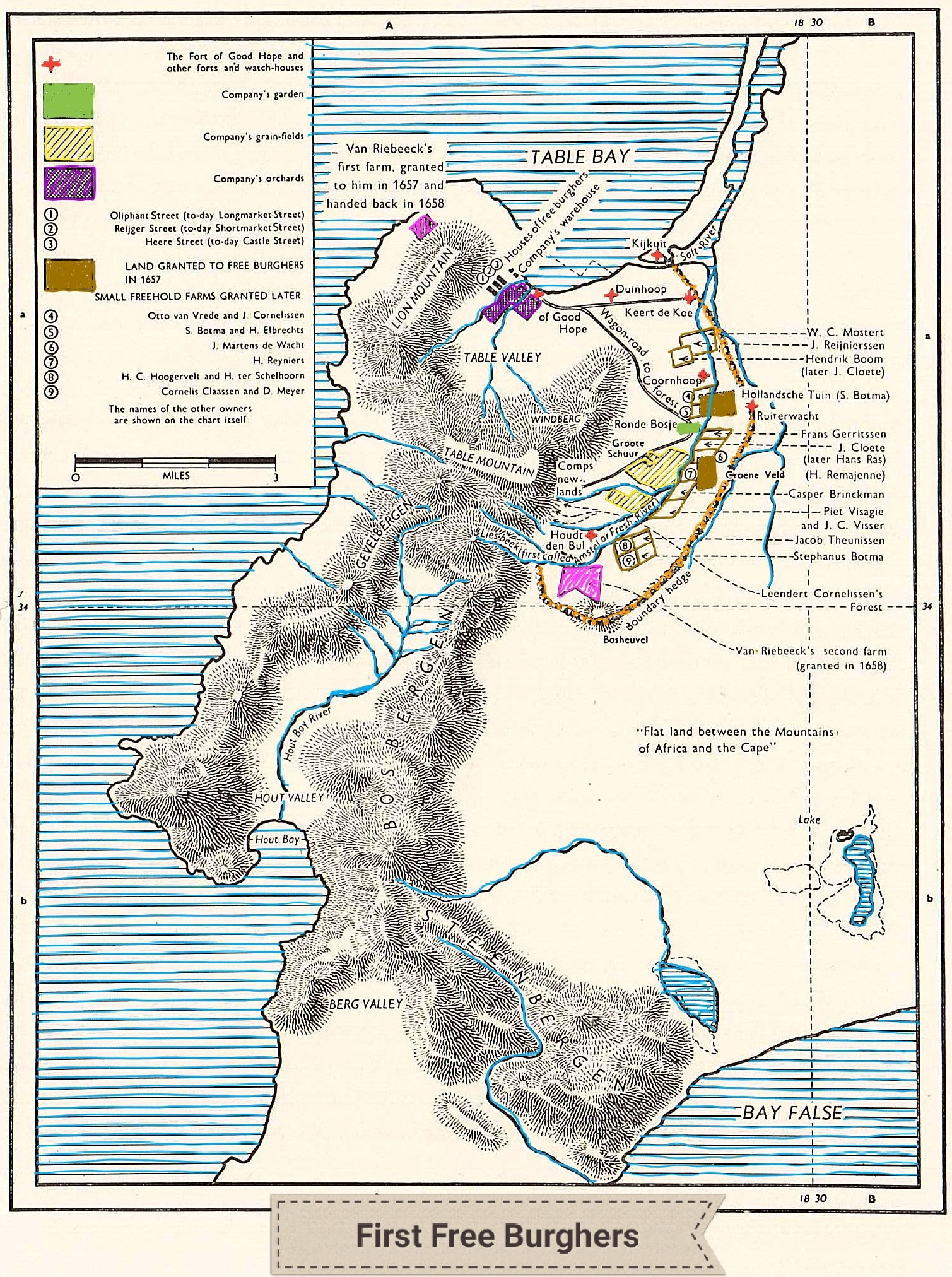
Settlement of the first Free Burghers

Company's Garden, at Rondebosch
Company's grain-fields, at Groote Schuur
Land Granted to Free Burghers in 1657 at Groeneveld(Stephen's Colony) and Dutch Garden (Harman's Colony)
Military forts and watch-houses
Company's orchards, near the Fort of Good Hope
Jan van Riebeeck's farms
Boundary fence which were later by a hedge also known as Van Riebeeck's Hedge
1 Oliphant Street (to-day Longmarket Street)
2 Reijger Street (to-day Shortmarket Street)
3 Heere Street (to-day Castle Street)
Small freehold farms granted later
4 Otto van Vrede and J Cornelissen
5 S. Botma and H Elbrechts
6 J. Martens de Wacht
7 H. Reyniers
8 H.C. Hoogervelt and H. ter Schelhoorn
9 Cornelis Claassen and D Meyer
Rivers and water indication

== Living conditions ==
=== Occupations ===
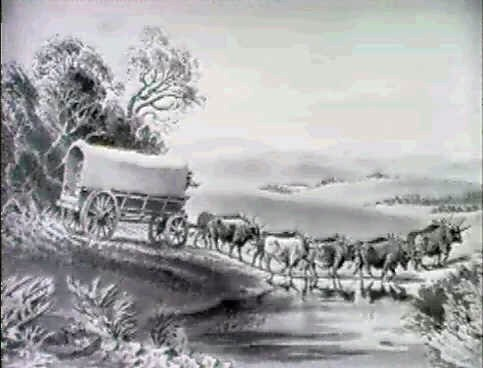
Cape Wagons were built by the burghers, the wagons were adjusted to accommodate the rough Cape landscape

The early free burghers were mostly petty officers with families, who drew money instead of rations, and who could derive a portion of their food from their gardens, as well as sell their vegetables to the Company and passing ships to obtain an income. The opportunities to become a successful entrepreneur were abundant and many skilled Europeans applied for free burgher status. The VOC had built a corn mill which was operated by the use of horses, but after a short time it was decided to make use of river water as a motive power. The tender for the construction of the mill was awarded to free burgher Wouter Mostert and when it was in working order he took charge of it and received income on shares of payments made for grinding.

Some of the men who had received land established themselves as farmers while others took service with the farmers as farm workers. Leendert Cornelissen, a ships carpenter, received a grant of a strip of forest at the foot of the mountain. His object was to cut timber for sale, all kinds of which prices were fixed by the council while Elbert Dirksen and Hendrik van Surwerden made a living as tailors. Most received their free papers because they possessed a certain useful skill such as Christian Janssen and Peter Cornelissen who had been expert hunters in the Company's service. Most free burghers negotiated deals with the VOC which were beneficial to both the Company and the burgher such as Dr Jan Vetteman, the surgeon of the fort, who arranged for a monopoly of practice in his profession.

Applicants received land in accordance to the purposes for which the land was to be used while carefully taking into consideration the set of skills and experiences possessed by each individual. Roelof Zieuwerts, for instance, received a small piece of forest where he could make a living as a wagon and plough maker. Martin Vlockaart, Pieter Jacobs and Jan Adriansen maintained themselves as fishermen, while Pieter Kley, Dirk Vreem, and Pieter Heynse made a living by sawing and selling yellow wood plank as well as to work their occupation as carpenters.

=== Slaves ===
The merchant vessel named Amersfoort had captured 250 Angolan slaves, mostly children, from a Portuguese slaver on the Brazilian coast. The vessel arrived on 28 March 1658 at Table Bay. The settlers assisted the people on board the ship with refreshments. The tedious journey at sea had taken a toll on the crew and slaves; the Amersfoort arrived with 323 men with 29 dead and 30 sick. Jan van Riebeeck founded the colony's first school for the purpose of educating the enslaved children in Dutch-Christian values until they were old and strong enough to work for the Dutch settlers.

=== Education ===
The first school to be built in South Africa was for the purpose of educating the rescued slaves from the Amersfoort. However, the school was later used to educate the children of the free burghers. At school, the children were taught to read and write and to compile accounts in gulden and stuivers. The school fees were equal to one half shilling per month for each child of a burgher, enslaved and Khoisan children were taught free of charge or Pro Deo.

== Governance ==
=== Trade ===
During a visit from the commissioner Rijcklof van Goens in 1657, several regulations concerning the burghers were drawn up, as well as copious instructions from the government. Restrictions were placed on servants of the Company, greatly benefiting free burghers who were no longer regarded as servants.

- Servants were prohibited from cultivating gardens larger than was required for their own use
- Burghers were allowed to purchase cattle from the Khoisan, provided they purchased the cattle at the same price the company was offered.

=== Burgher Council ===
The free burghers nominated persons among them who could serve as representatives at the Council meetings at the Cape. The first burgher Councilor (Dutch title: burgherraden), Steven Jansz, was appointed in 1657 by Rijcklof van Goens. The following year he was joined by his colleague Hendrik Boom to serve as burgherraden in the Council.

=== Dutch East India Company ===
The high ranking commissioner Mattheus van der Broeck of the Dutch East India Company arrived at the settlement in early 1670 accompanied with a fleet of fifteen ships. After deliberation about the general functioning of the settlement, the high ranking officers issued several important decrees which revealed the Company's position towards the free burghers. Commissioner Van der Broeck's visit reached the following conclusion.

- The settlement did not produce sufficient grain for the consumption of the garrison and inhabitants, resulting in the importation of a large quantity of rice yearly. It was decided that in order to reduce costs, a large farming community consisting of 'free burghers' was to be established at Hottentots Holland. The price for grain was increased in order to encourage farm development
- The commissioner was not impressed with the canteens operated by the burghers and limited the number of canteens to nine for the whole settlement, Jacob Rosendael was permitted to sell wine produced from his vineyard
- The first request to tender for construction work in South Africa was awarded to free burgher Wouter Mostert, setting the precedent for public works tenders in future. In addition, free burghers were granted the right to tender for the supply of construction materials required by the Company
- Free burghers were prohibited from trading livestock with the Khoisan, however licenses were granted to the burghers in order to hunt large game wherever they chose.

Over the years the burghers became successful in farming to an extent that in 1695 the directors of the Company issued instructions that farming and cattle dealing should be given up by the Cape Government and food should be sourced directly from the burgher farmers through a tender process.

=== Burgher militia ===
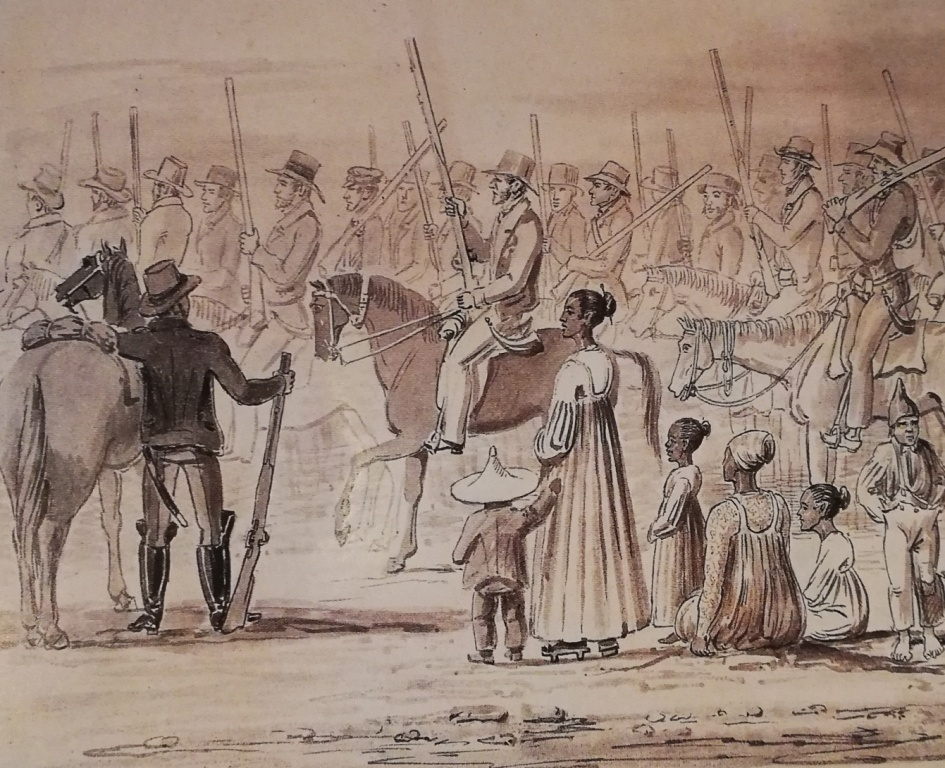
A "kommando," of free burghers assembling for action in the Seventh Xhosa War.

The commissioner further instructed the Cape authorities to provide assistance to the free burghers not only for the sake of produce but in order to gain favor because of the assistance which they could present in time of war. By that time, the free burghers constituted a company of militia eighty-nine strong.

== Population growth ==
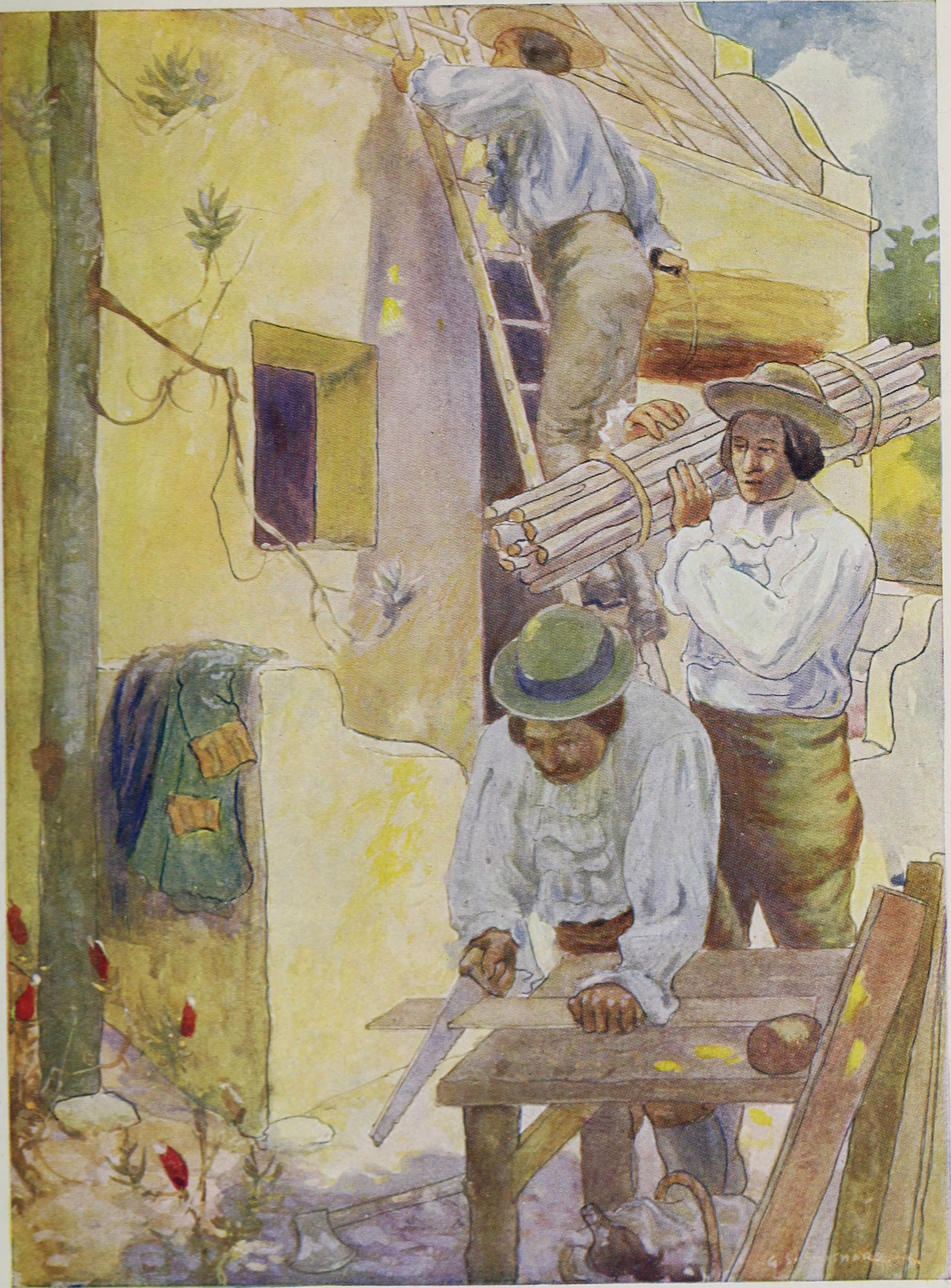
French Huguenots building a house at the Cape

=== Dutch Free Immigrants ===
The authorities of the East India Company had endeavored to convince gardeners and small farmers to emigrate from Europe to South Africa, but were met with little success. Occasionally they were able to send out to their eastern holdings a few families who were enticed by the promise of wealth. The Cape had little to offer in comparison. In October 1670, however, the Chamber of Amsterdam announced that a few families were willing to leave for the Cape and Mauritius the following December. Among the new names of burghers at this time are found those of Jacob and Dirk van Niekerk, Johannes van As, Francois Villion, Jacob Brouwer, Jan van Eden, Hermanus Potgieter, Albertus Gildenhuis, and Jacobus van den Berg.

=== French Huguenots ===
During 1688–1689, the colony was greatly strengthened by the arrival of nearly two hundred French Huguenots. Political refugees from the religious wars in France following the revocation of the Edict of Nantes were settled at Stellenbosch, Drakenstein, Franschhoek ("French corner") and Paarl. The influence of this small body of immigrants on the character of the Dutch settlement was marked. The Company in 1701 directed that only Dutch should be taught in schools. This resulted in the Huguenots assimilating by the middle of the 18th century, with the French language effectively being lost to the community. The settlement gradually spread eastwards, and by 1754 lands stretching as far as Algoa Bay were under the colony's dominion.
