= Maurits Pasques de Chavonnes =

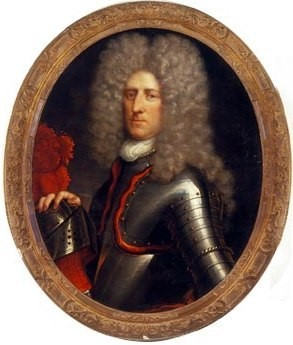

4th Governor of the Dutch Cape Colony
- In office 28 March 1714 – 8 September 1724
- Preceded by: Willem Helot (acting)
- Succeeded by: Jan de la Fontaine (acting)

Personal details
- Born: c. 1654 The Hague, Dutch Republic
- Died: 8 September 1724 Cape Town
- Resting place: Cape Town

Maurits Pasques de Chavonnes (c.1654 – 8 September 1724) was governor of the Dutch Cape Colony from 1714 till 1721.

== Early life ==
Maurits (or Mauritz) Pasques de Chavonnes was born in The Hague and baptized on 23 July 1654 in de Grote Kerk, The Hague. He was the youngest son of Jeanne de Savornin and Pierre Pasques de Chavonnes, whose father, Joachim Pasques, marquis de Chavonnes, fled from France after the St. Bartholomew's Day massacre in 1572. He married Bathazarina Kien in 1689 and later had two children: Anna Magdalena Pasques de Chavonnes and Pieter Rochus Pasques de Chavonnes.

== Career ==
He trained as a soldier and progressed to lieutenant colonel of the States-General of the Netherlands. Mauritz de Chavonnes was in charge of the infantry regiment in the army of the Dutch Republic during the War of the Spanish Succession (1701-1713). After the Treaty of Utrecht which ended the war, he joined the Dutch East India Company, who appointed him as the Cape Governor in 1714, replacing Louis van Assenburgh who had died on 27 December 1712.

Within the first few months after arrival in the Cape he regulated the responsibilities of the garrison and for the first time in the Cape's history allowed the soldiers to wear uniforms and drafted instructions for the use of weapons and ammunition. De Chavonnes also instituted grazing licenses for the Cape stock farmers: in July 1714 he decided that (according to the Politieke Raad) "every person that has the requirement for grazing on any land shall request permission, and for recognition shall pay a semi-annual fee of six or an annual fee of twelve Dutch rijksdaalder to the Company". Furthermore, the farmers had to pay tithes of all their harvests to the Dutch East India Company. He contributed to the development of the Cape and was promoted to Justice of India in 1721.

His military innovations included the organisation of so-called Free Black and Asian citizens in Table Valley into a military unit called Companie Vryswarten (Company Free Blacks) in 1722 under the command of their own officers. This company, together with others, took turns in the night watch of the company's barracks.

He died on 8 September 1724 in the Cape after a day's illness and was buried with military honours on 14 September.

== Bibliography ==
- 500 Jaar Suid-Afrikaanse Geskiedenis, Prof. CF Muller
