= Willem Adriaan van der Stel =

Dutch colonial governor

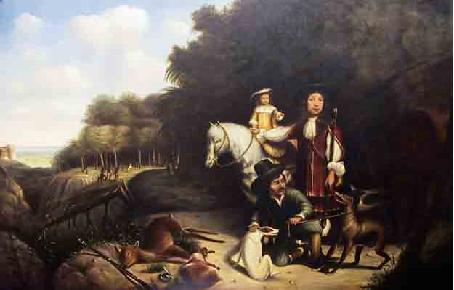
- Portrait of Simon van der Stel and his son Willem Adriaan. The original was destroyed in a fire in 1962; a replica was created based on photographs

2nd Governor of the Dutch Cape Colony
- In office 2 November 1699 – 3 June 1707
- Preceded by: Simon van der Stel
- Succeeded by: Johan Cornelis d'Ableing (acting)

Personal details
- Born: 24 August 1664 Haarlem
- Died: 11 November 1733 (aged 69) Lisse

Willem Adriaan van der Stel (24 August 1664 – 11 November 1733) was an Extraordinary Councillor of the Dutch East Indies, and Governor of the Cape Colony, a way station for the Dutch East India Company (VOC), from 23 January 1699 to 1707. He was dismissed after a revolt and was exiled to the Netherlands.

== Early life ==
Willem van der Stel was the eldest of six children of Simon van der Stel (1639–1712) and Johanna Jacoba Six (1645–1700), who were prominent members of the Dutch merchant class. He was baptized in Haarlem and had a younger brother Adriaan (1665-1720). His paternal grandfather had been the VOC commander of Mauritius, and his grandmother a mestizo. His mother was related to Jacob J. Hinlopen and Jan Six and who was involved in the silk trade and a friend of Rembrandt. Willem was fifteen when he went to the Cape in 1679 with his father and aunt (Cornelia Six); his mother stayed behind. He worked for the company as bookkeeper. In 1684, he married Maria de Haze, and returned to Amsterdam where he would have four children baptized but two died. (Her late father François de Haze worked for the Dutch East India Company as an opperhoofd on Deshima, and in Persia and Bengal, and was also involved in the silk trade).

Willem Adriaan van der Stel held the lordship of Nieuw and Oud-Vossemeer on the island of Tholen, probably through his wife. In 1691, he became an schepen of Amsterdam. He did not return to the Cape until January 1699 when he was appointed to succeed his father as Governor of the colony.

== Rule as Governor ==
Van der Stel displayed an interest in horticulture and agriculture and conducted extensive farming experiments. He sent quite a few aloes to the Hortus Botanicus Amsterdam. He was the author of one of South Africa's earliest gardening almanacs. Van der Stel expanded the VOC's gardens and sent expeditions into the interior to the north to explore the rest of the country. He established the "Land van Waveren", now known as Tulbagh, and laid the cornerstone for the Groote Kerk in Cape Town.

Van der Stel's legacy is however stained by his apparent greed and extravagance. In 1705, during his rule, Van der Stel was viewed as corrupt and dictatorial.

== Revolt and dismissal ==
Van der Stel owned a private estate, Vergelegen, which was the foundation of the present day Somerset West and its wine route. The land was granted to him in 1700, and he spent much of the VOC resources on its development. This allowed him an unfair advantage and led to strained relationships with the local “free burghers” (independent farmers).

His unilateral actions determining who could participate in the monopoly of wine and meat triggered a revolt amongst the farmers. In 1706 Adam Tas, Willem van Zijl and Henning Husing drew up a petition objecting to Van der Stel's activities. Some 63 (out of 550) burghers signed the document and it was sent to the VOC headquarters in Amsterdam.

The petition was at first rejected. Van der Stel had Tas arrested, tried and imprisoned—in the "Black Hole", an infamous dungeon at the Castle of Good Hope.

Because 31 of the signatories were Huguenots, and since the Netherlands was at war with France, the failed petition continued to cause concern in Amsterdam. Fearing that the discontent might cause some burghers to become spies for the French, the VOC dismissed Van der Stel, and ordered his return to the Netherlands (23 April 1707). He left the colony in 1708 and returned to the Netherlands where he spent the rest of his life in exile. Subsequently, no VOC employees were allowed to own land in the colony. Louis van Assenburgh (1708–1711) became his successor.

Three years after his dismissal, Vergelegen was sold and divided into four separate farms, and the homestead was ordered to be demolished.

== Alternative views on Van der Stel's legacy ==
There is some disagreement regarding Van der Stel's legacy. Although most sources agree that his rule at the Cape was authoritarian, beset by favouritism, and characterised by misuse of company assets, others claim that this was in no way unique to Van der Stel's tenure as governor.

Some point to the scale of his plans and activities in agriculture and horticulture as evidence of a man of great vision and imagination. Others note his role in the development of the unique Cape Dutch architecture, and see him as a martyr.

== See also ==
- 1700s in South Africa
