= Simon van der Stel =

Dutch colonial administrator

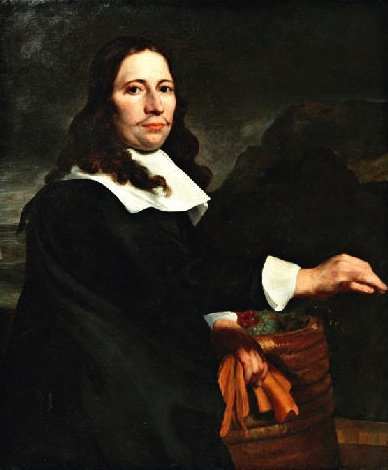
- Portrait of Van der Stel by Pieter van Anraedt

1st Governor of the Dutch Cape Colony
- In office 1 June 1691 – 2 November 1699
- Preceded by: Himself, as commander
- Succeeded by: Willem Adriaan van der Stel
- Commander; 10 December 1679 – 1 June 1691
- Preceded by: Hendrik Crudop (acting)
- Succeeded by: Himself, as governor

Personal details
- Born: 14 October 1639 Born at sea, Indian Ocean
- Died: 24 June 1712 (aged 72) Constantia, Cape Colony
- Spouse: Johanna Jacoba Six
- Children: Willem Adriaan van der Stel
- Parent: Adriaan van der Stel (father)
- Employer: Dutch East India Company

Simon van der Stel (14 October 1639 – 24 June 1712) was the first Governor of the Dutch Cape Colony (1691), the settlement at the Cape of Good Hope. He was interested in botany, establishing vineyards Groot and Klein Constantia, and producing a famous dessert wine. He is considered one of the founders of South African viticulture.

== Background ==
Simon born in 1639 to Adriaan van der Stel, an official of the Dutch East India Company (VOC), and Maria Lievens, the daughter of a freed slave. At the time it was common for VOC in Batavia to marry women of non-European descent. This made van der Stel the first person not to be born in Europe and of mixed race heritage or Coloured as it came to be known in South Africa - to be appointed Commander and Governor of the Cape Colony. In 1639 Adriaan was appointed the first Dutch governor of Mauritius. Adriaan replaced 'Onderkoopman' Pieter de Goijer who was sent by the Dutch East India Company in 1638 with 25 men and cattle, sheep, geese, chickens and rabbits to start the new refreshment station for the Company.

Simon was born at sea while his father was en route to take up his new posting on the island; Simon spent his youth there. Adriaan's governorship ended in 1645 when he left Mauritius and transferred to Dutch Ceylon. He was murdered in 1646 by the troops of Rajasinha II of Kandy. Simon, his mother and his sisters returned to Batavia, capital of the Dutch East Indies and his mother remarried in 1648, to Captain Hendrik of Ghent. Little is known of what happened to Simon during this time, other than he returned to the Dutch Republic in 1659.

== Career ==
Simon then went to the United Provinces, where he associated with Willem Six, a wealthy cloth dealer. In 1663, he married Willem's daughter, Johanna Jacoba Six (1645–1700), and they had six children. She was the niece of Thymen and Jacob J. Hinlopen, founders of the VOC and Noordsche Compagnie, besides being known as art collectors.

In 1679, he was appointed "Commander" of the VOC's colony at the Cape of Good Hope, through the growing influence of his relative, Joan Huydecoper van Maarsseveen, a mayor and an amateur botanist. Simon was involved in making wine in Muiderberg; when he left the country, he handed the vineyards over to Hendrik van Rheede, the former governor of Malabar region and a famous botanist.

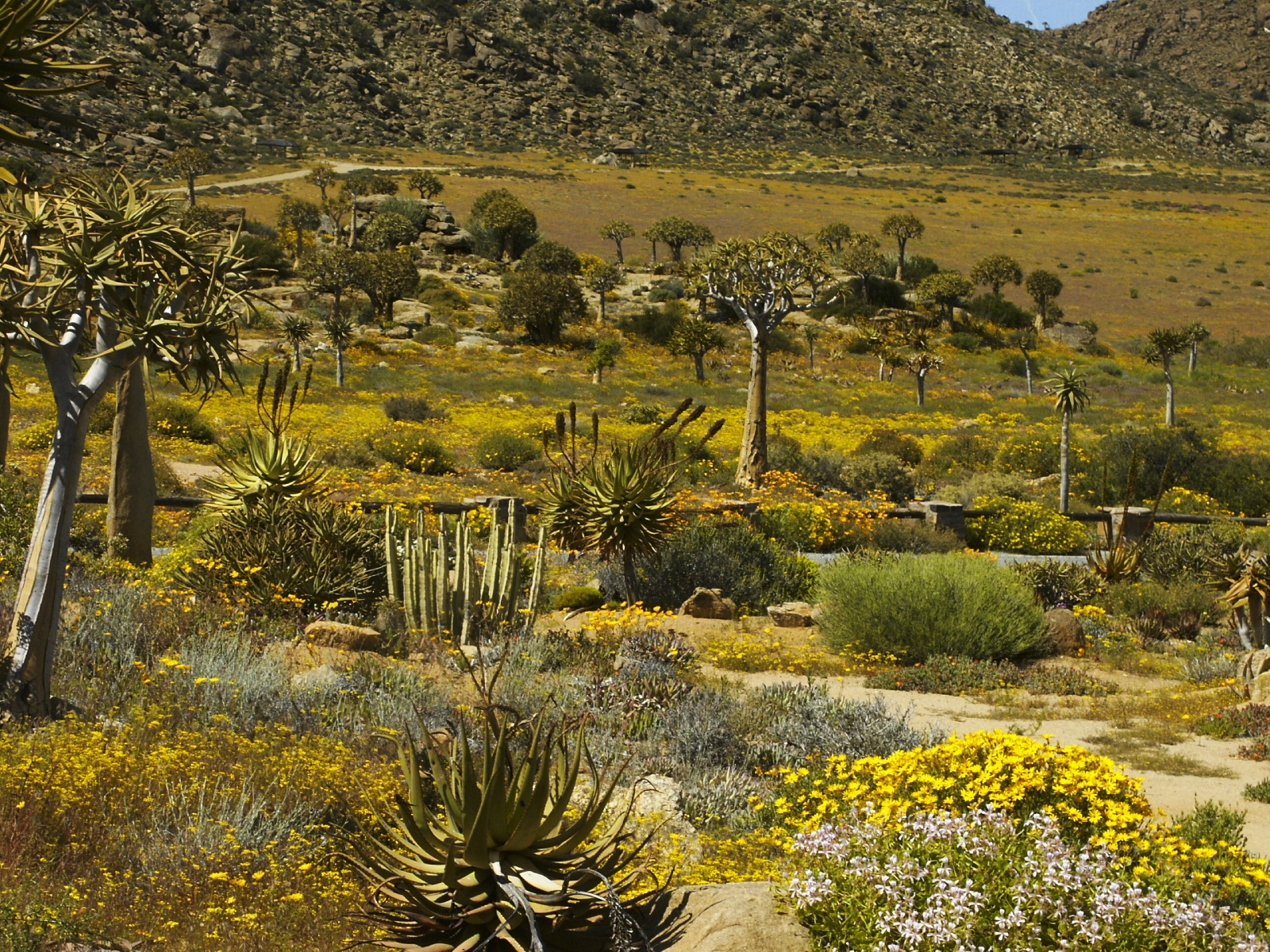
Namaqualand

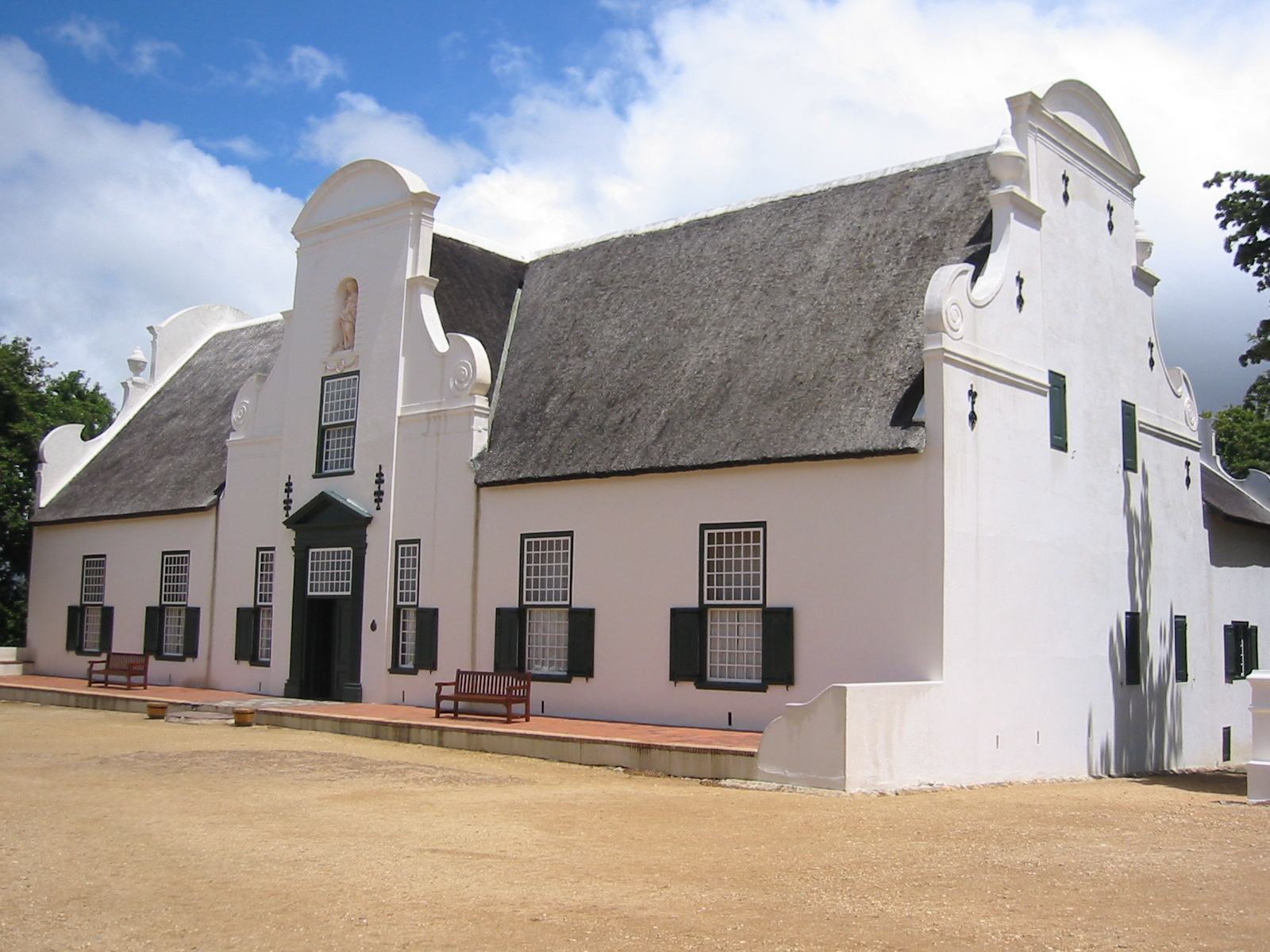
Groot Constantia

Van der Stel and his wife did not enjoy a very good relationship and her sister Cornelia accompanied her husband to the Cape. Van der Stel never saw his wife again, though he remained devoted to her and frequently sent her money. Johanna Jacoba sent the furnishings and works of art required to fit out the governor's residence at Groot Constantia. These included several art works including The Fisherman, an unfinished painting by Simon de Vlieger, which was one of 13 of his works purchased by Jan van de Cappelle.

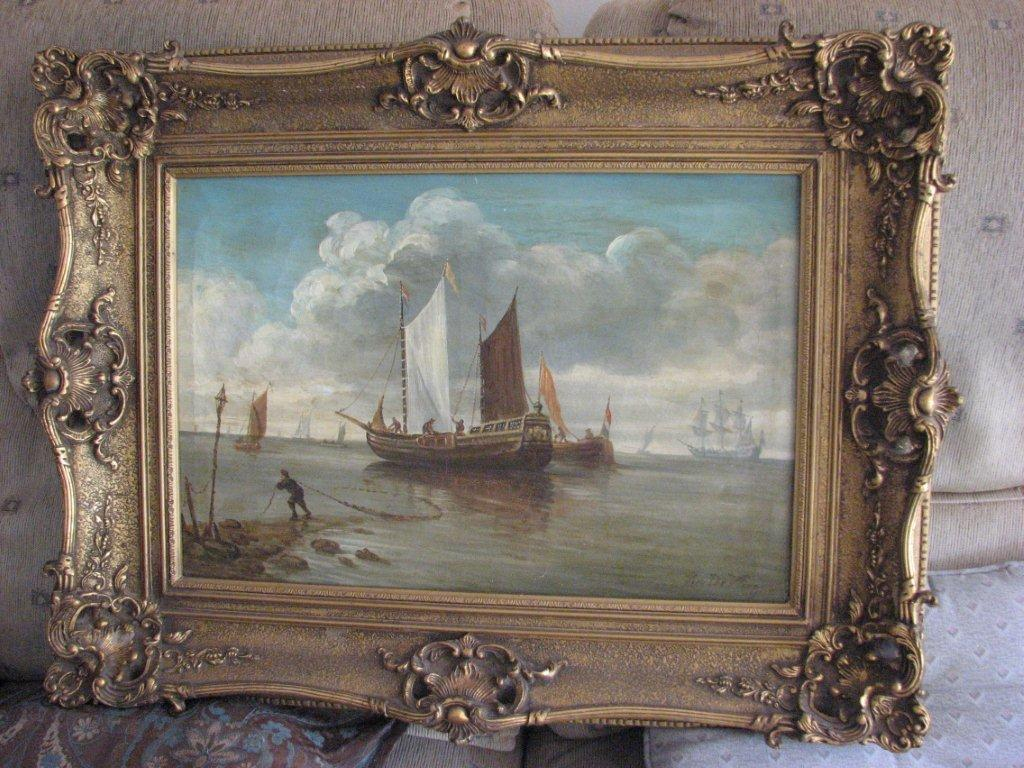
De Vlieger The Fisherman (unfinished)

In 1685, he was visited by Hendrik van Rheede (with whom he shared in great interest in tropical medicine and botany), and was given Constantia as a reward for 'good and faithful services to the VOC'. In 1685–86, he left for an expedition to the Copper Mountains at Springbok (Namaqualand), where he made topographic and geographic, botanical and zoological observations. In his translation of this work from Dutch, Baron Wilhelm Ludwig van Buchenroder spells the surname as 'van der Stell'.

In 1691, the VOC replaced the office of "Commander" with "Governor", and Van der Stel was promoted to the new position. His house, Groot Constantia, was well furnished with fine paintings, including The Fisherman. The painting came up for sale at the auction of Van der Stel's estate in 1716.

Simon van der Stel was very harsh at times, such as when he imprisoned in appalling conditions the crew and priests of the French ships Le Coche and La Normande, in June 1689. The ships were returning from Pondichéry laden not only with goods for the French East Indies Company, but also with private collections of diamonds and jewelries which seem to have been appropriated by Van der Stel.

Every one of his four sons was at one time or another with him in South Africa. Willem Adriaan, after being magistrate of Amsterdam, succeeded his father as Governor of the Cape; Frans "de jonker" became a farmer at the Cape; Adrian became governor of Amboyna (1706–1720); Cornelis was one of the 352 shipwrecked in the Ridderschap van Holland in 1694. An expedition under Willem de Vlamingh was sent out to look for survivors on islands in the Indian Ocean or on the coast of Western Australia.

Van der Stel retired in 1699, and was succeeded by his son Willem Adriaan van der Stel. In retirement, Simon devoted himself to his wine estates (known as Constantia), where he died in 1712. François Valentijn visited his son Frans in March 1714. The estate was sold in parts (also Bergvliet) in 1716; the auction took four days and was very well attended.

== Legacy ==
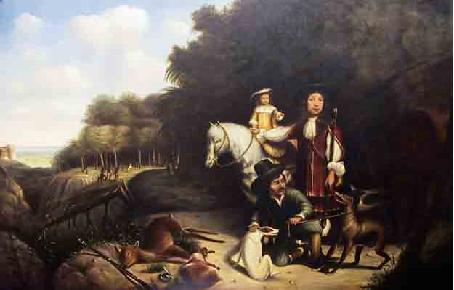
Van der Stel and his son Willem Adriaan

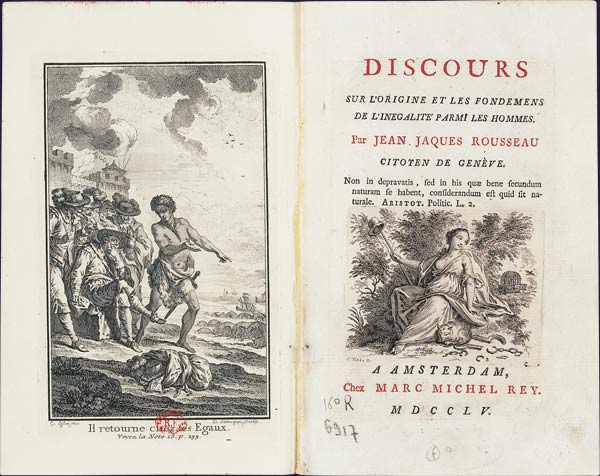
DOI Rousseau

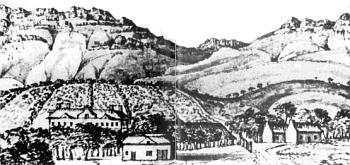
Constantia door E.V. Stade

The town of Stellenbosch (founded in 1679) was named after him and Simon's Town is also named after him, as well as the Simonsberg mountain. An early ship of the South African Navy, SAS Simon van der Stel was also named for him, in 1952.

Jean-Jacques Rousseau, in his Discourse on Inequality, refers to Governor Van der Stel by name in a story about a Hottentot raised by the Dutch who chooses to "return to his equals" rather than remain in civilised society. According to Rousseau, Van der Stel himself raised the "Hottentot" from birth "in the principles of the Christian religion and in the practices of European customs". The frontispiece of the Discourse features Van der Stel and the "Hottentot" above the phrase, Il retourne chez ses Egaux.

Van der Stel was widely known for his development of the South African wine industry. Journals and records from Van der Stel's travels are kept by the Library of Trinity College Dublin as part of The Fagel Collection.

== Ancestry ==
Simon Van der Stel
Adriaan van der Stel
Maria Adriaens Estella
Simon Van der Stel
Hendrik Lievens
Maria Lievens
Monica da Costa
