= Hattingh family =

South African family

Hattingh
- Current region: South Africa
- Earlier spellings: Hatting
- Origin: Speyer, Germany
- Connected families: Visser family Basson family Dednam family
- Estates: Spier; La Motte; Lekkerwijn; Goede Hoop

The Hattingh family is a prominent South African family. Formerly landowners of the Spier estate in Stellenbosch, they have more recently become influential in the politics of their country. Their founder, Hans Heinrich Hattingh, was a German settler who served as a free burgher of the Dutch Cape Colony in the late 1600s and early 1700s.

== History ==
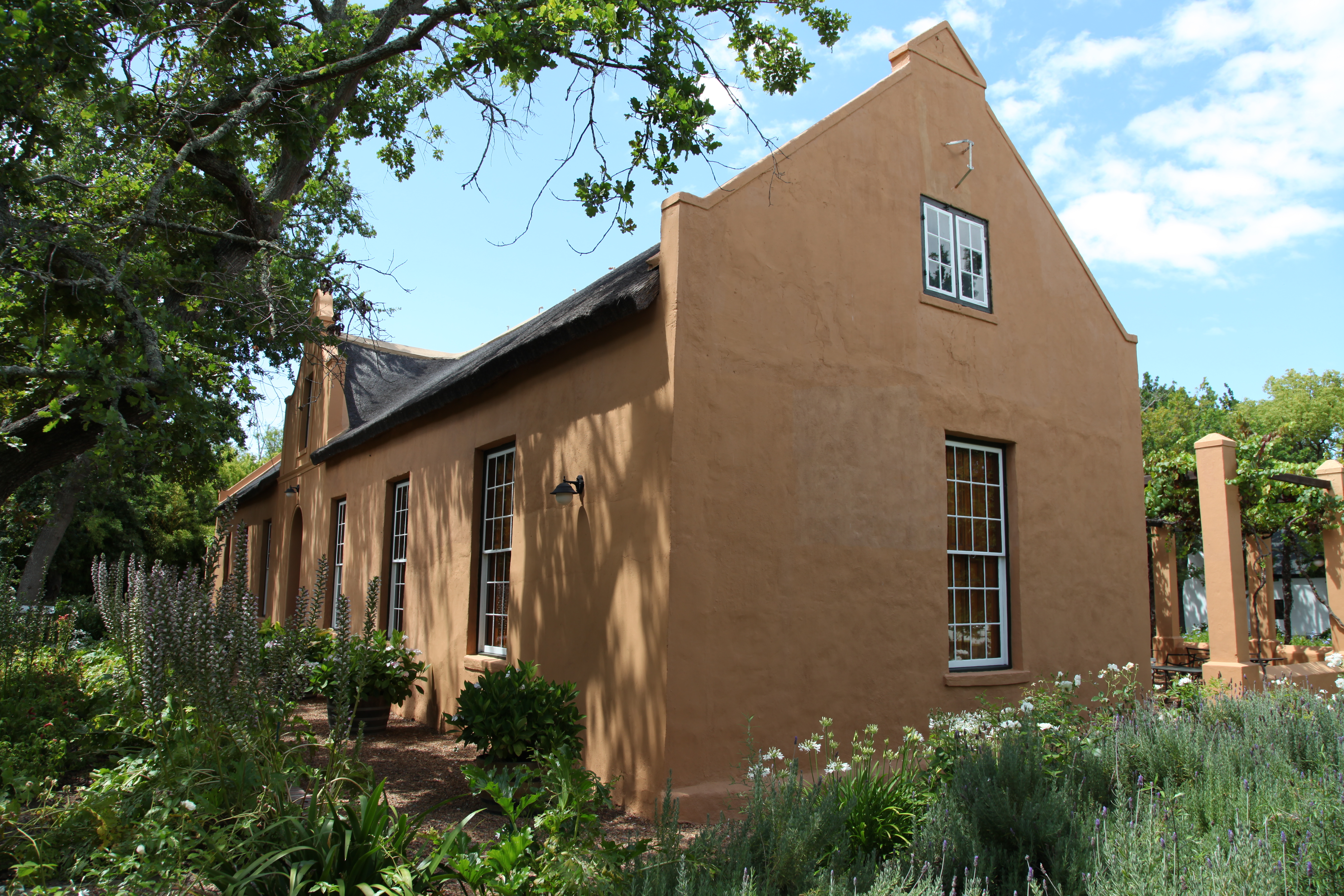
The Manor House at Spier.

Upon immigrating to Southern Africa in 1692, Hans Heinrich Hattingh started farming at a place that would become known as La Motte. At this point, he married his first wife Marie de Lanoy. In addition to La Motte, he also owned the farms Goede Hoop and Lekkerwijn during this period. A number of years later, Hattingh was widowed. He then sold La Motte to Pierre Joubert, a Huguenot settler, who went on to name it after his ancestral home in France.

Hattingh later married Susannah Visser, a daughter of his fellow free burgher Jan Coenraad Visser and the Indian slave woman Maria van Negapatnam. During this marriage, he owned the Spier estate in Stellenbosch, which he is also said to have named after his own homeland in Europe. He had acquired it as a result of his being pressured into supporting Governor Willem Adriaan van der Stel in his conflict with his fellow colonists.

After writing a letter of support for Van der Stel, the governor granted him the estate - one of the Cape's best. This was a fact that led to considerable resentment on the part of the rebel free burghers, as they regarded Hattingh as a traitor to their cause as a result of it. By the point of his death, Spier would be so valuable that the cost of its slaves alone would be sufficient to purchase a separate farm. Although he didn't leave an inventory of the structures on the estate, it is surmised that they were substantial for the period.

Hattingh had three children with Marie, and ten with Susannah. Both they and their descendants would in turn go on to marry into such families as the Bassons (with Angela van Bengale being the great-grandmother-in-law of his son Christiaan Hattingh I) and the Dednams (with Catharina "Ina" Wagner being the wife of his contemporary descendant Chris Hattingh).

== Notable members ==
- Carina Serfontein, opposition politician, currently serving as a municipal councillor.
- Chris Hattingh, opposition politician and party leader, currently serving as an MP.
- D. M. Terblanche, photographer, poet and visual artist.
- Douglas Stephen Bax, clergyman, author and anti-Apartheid activist.
- Hans Heinrich Hattingh, immigrant, free burgher and landowner, progenitor of the family.
- Juanita Terblanche, opposition politician, currently serving as a municipal councillor.
