= Talking Heads Africa =

Talking Heads
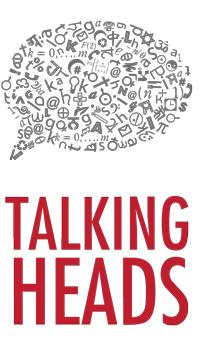
- Mission statement: Identify, showcase, network and expose Africa’s “Thought Leaders” as a way of both developing and depicting ideas as well as opening a window into an alternative reality outside the commonly held notions of continental collapse.
- Commercial?: No
- Type of project: Art and culture
- Location: Cape Town/Johannesburg, South Africa
- Owner: Africa Centre
- Founder: Brett Bailey
- Established: 18 February 2010
- Website: www.africacentre.net/talking-heads

Talking Heads (Africa) was introduced in Cape Town in 2008 as part of the Infecting the City public art festival. Talking Heads has four core components that form the project. These include: developing a platform for conversation and exchange with and between experts; creating a network of African thought leaders; shooting mini-documentaries that define these leaders and their contributions; developing the tools to make this model work in cities all over the African continent.

== Purpose ==
Educating the African continent or reshaping perspectives of who and what Africa is and is capable of is no small undertaking nor their ambition. Talking Heads is designed to identify, showcase, network and expose Africa's “Thought Leaders” as a way of both developing and depicting ideas as well as opening a window into an alternative reality outside the commonly held notions of continental collapse. This is a reality that showcases what is extraordinary about the people in Africa, their visions and current manifestations that are solving problems and making a meaningful and affirmative contribution to their communities, cities, countries, continent and the world. Their approach does however provide a model that can be replicated anywhere in Africa and with scale it can offer an alternative narrative of who and what we know about this place. This model is – Talking Heads.

== Intimate Conversation – TH Live ==
The Talking Heads live events use the art of conversation as a potent way to exchange knowledge about the world and the people. People share, debate and adapt thoughts through the conversation. Its manifestation was designed to create a platform of social interaction. In practice Talking Heads constructs as a public event where ticket holders have an intimate 20 minute conversation with four different experts. There are two or three audience members and one expert per table. Each event contains 40 to 50 experts. These experts range from cosmologists to economic forecasters, futurists, sex worker activists, nuclear physicists, etc.

== Broader Access – TH Media ==
Talking Heads live creates mini-documentaries with participants from the Talking Heads live events. The content is packaged using the media channels in Africa, television radio and mobile phones and are 5 to 8 minutes in duration.

== Network – TH Connection ==
Talking Heads creates an online archive of the participants which includes a small bio and video/audio cast about the experts particular fields of knowledge. This archive is a tool for exchange and collaboration across disciplines to address some of the issues that African leaders are confronted with. This network will be further developed online through forums, blogs and other social networking devices.

== Do-it Yourself – TH Seed ==
A social entrepreneur franchise approach is established by Africa Centre to replicating the project. Intentions are to conduct 4 to 6 Talking Heads live events in South Africa over 12 months. Talking Heads live and media will be migrated to four new cities in Africa each year. After the initial live event, partners of Africa Centre will be given the license to host their own future TH events. The partners will then feed their local thought leaders into the central online network platform and make their own mini-documentaries for distribution locally.
