= Hans Heinrich Hattingh =

South African free burgher and progenitor

- Born: circa 1662; Speyer, Germany
- Died: 1729; Stellenbosch, Dutch Cape Colony
- Other names: Hans Hendrik Hattingh
- Occupation(s): Free burgher Landowner; Farmer
- Spouses: Marie de Lanoy; Susannah Visser
- Children: 13

Hans Heinrich Hattingh (c.1662 - 1729), otherwise known as Hans Hendrik Hattingh, was a German settler in the Dutch Cape Colony. He was a free burgher of the Dutch East India Company.

== Life ==
Hans Heinrich Hattingh was born in about 1662 in Speyer, Germany.

Upon immigrating to Southern Africa in 1692, he started farming at a place that would become known as La Motte. At this point, Hattingh married his first wife Marie de Lanoy. In addition to La Motte, he also owned the farms Goede Hoop and Lekkerwijn during this period. A number of years later, Hattingh was widowed. He then sold La Motte to Pierre Joubert, a Huguenot settler, who went on to name it after his ancestral home in France.

Hattingh later married Susannah Visser, a daughter of his fellow free burgher Jan Coenraad Visser and the Indian slave woman Maria van Negapatnam. During this marriage, he owned the Spier estate in Stellenbosch, which he is also said to have named after his own homeland in Europe. He had acquired it as a result of his being pressured into supporting Governor Willem Adriaan van der Stel in his conflict with his fellow colonists.

After writing a letter of support for Van der Stel, the governor granted him the estate - one of the Cape's best. This was a fact that led to considerable resentment on the part of the rebel free burghers, as they regarded Hattingh as a traitor to their cause as a result of it. By the point of his death, Spier would be so valuable that the cost of its slaves alone would be sufficient to purchase a separate farm. Although he didn't leave an inventory of the structures on the estate, it is surmised that they were substantial for the period.

Hattingh had three children with his first wife, and ten with his second. He died in 1729.

== Descendants ==
Hattingh is the progenitor of the prominent Hattingh family of South Africa. Counted amongst his descendants are the national politician Chris Hattingh, his daughter and fellow politician Juanita Terblanche, and the anti-Apartheid activist and clergyman Douglas Stephen Bax.
