= Siwela Sonke =

General information
- Name: Siwela Sonke
- Year founded: 1994
- Website: Official Website

Senior staff
- Director: Jay Pather

Artistic staff
- Resident choreographers: Neliswa Rushualang

Siwela Sonke Dance Theatre is a South African dance company based in Durban that emerged from a training and development programme for black dancers with no access to training opportunities, initiated by The Playhouse Company in Durban in 1994. The company name translates to "crossing over to a new place altogether." SSDT is a registered non-profit organization, with income generated through commissions and honoraria, local and international. The Company seeks to make cultural products available to a wide range of the public by actively promoting works in public spaces where there is free access, with a strong focus on community development. The style is a mix of Contemporary African Dance, Traditional African Dance, Contemporary Modern Dance, Traditional Indian Dance and Classical Ballet. SSDT is also noted for their multi-media collaborations, using video, architecture, and site-specificity in their performances.

== History ==
SSDT was started by The Playhouse Company in Durban in 1994 from a training and development program for Black dancers with no access to traditional training opportunities. Jay Pather and Alfred Hinkel of Jazzart Dance Theatre devised the original curriculum and in 1996 Pather was appointed artistic director. SSDT quickly developed a reputation as an important member of the South African dance scene, and continued to pursue their mission of education and community development. In 1999 SSDT separated from The Playhouse Company and became a not-for-profit company. The company currently has 9 full-time dancers and collaborates with 10 ad hoc dancers.

== Awards ==
- Brett Kebble Major Art Award 2004: Jay Pather
- KZN DanceLink Dancer of the Year Award 2004: Neliswa Rushualang
- KZN DanceLink Dancer of the Year Award 2005: Siyanda Duma
- KZN DanceLink Best Newcomer (Male) Award 2005: Mxolisi Nkomonde
- KZN DanceLink Best Newcomer (Female) Award 2005: Rhia Ryan
- Outstanding Contribution in Arts and Humanities Award 2005, University of KwaZulu Natal: Jay Pather
- FNB Vita Awards for Choreography: Jay Pather
- FNB Vita Awards for Best Dancer: Ntombi Gasa
- Mayor's Achievement Award: Siwela Sonke Dance Theatre
- Abalongi Award for contribution to dance in Kwa Zulu Natal, presented by KZN DanceLink presented jointly to Ntombi Gasa and Neliswa Rushualang
- Tunkie Award presented at the FNB Dance Umbrella 2007 for Leadership in Dance: Jay Pather

== See Also... ==
- Jay Pather
- Jazzart Dance Theatre
