= Dada Masilo =

South African dancer and choreographer (1985–2024)

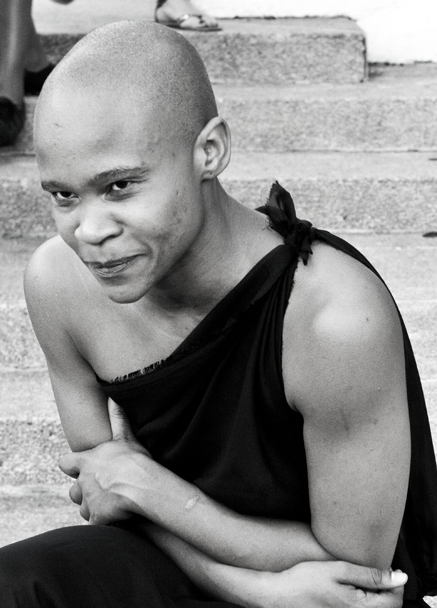
- Masilo in 2012
- Born: 21 February 1985; Soweto, South Africa
- Died: 29 December 2024 (aged 39); Johannesburg
- Education: Dance Factory; Jazzart Dance Theatre; Performing Arts Research and Training Studios
- Known for: Dance
- Awards: Standard Bank Young Artist Award

Dada Masilo (21 February 1985 – 29 December 2024) was a South African dancer and choreographer, known for her unique and innovative interpretations of classical ballets. Masilo was trained in classical ballet and contemporary dance, and fused these techniques with African dance steps to create her high-speed style. She appeared and collaborated internationally.

== Background ==
Masilo was born on 21 February 1985 in Soweto, a township of Johannesburg, South Africa, where she was also raised. As a girl, she appeared with other girls in a troupe that she formed to dance in the streets to Michael Jackson's songs. They were invited to the Art and Dance festival of the Dance Factory in Newtown, Johannesburg, a school to find and train young talents. She was noticed by its director Suzette Le Sueur, who invited her to train professionally and became her mentor. She gained recognition when she danced for Beatrix of the Netherlands at age eleven. She saw her first classic ballet at the time, Tchaikovsky' Swan Lake; she fell "in love with tutus and pointe shoes", and the performance prompted her interest in choreography. She began teaching at the school at age 19.

Around the age of 15, Masilo came out as a lesbian to her "very religious" mother, who "couldn’t accept it". When asked in 2022 about her tendency to focus on "controversial subjects" such as homophobia, Masilo stated "From that moment, I made it a point to try and make people understand it’s a choice. If you come out to your parents, they’re not going to have a heart attack and die! No. This is who I am, and you deal with it. I do not want to discriminate; I want to be the person that I am without having to hide."

Masilo studied at Braamfontein's National School for the Arts from 2002. In 2003 she moved on to train at the Jazzart Dance Theatre in Cape Town with Alfred Hinkel, preparing for training at the Performing Arts Research and Training Studios in Belgium from 2005.

With a background in both classical ballet and contemporary dance, she fused these techniques with African dance steps to create her high-speed style. She transformed classic ballets into "powerfully grounded, hip-shaking, moves of African dance" to tell stories of modern-day characters who suffer issues such as discrimination, inequality and domestic violence. Although she was interested more in the personal challenge of choreography than political statements, her pieces often addressed taboos such as homosexuality and race relations. One of her notable partners on stage was South African contemporary dancer Kyle Heinz Rossouw. She collaborated with William Kentridge, Ann Masina, and Gregory Maqoma, among others.

Masilo died unexpectedly in Johannesburg on 29 December 2024, at the age of 39, after a brief illness.

== Performance venues ==
- Dancing with Dada, in collaboration with William Kentridge, 2011
- The Bitter End of Rosemary, Düsseldorf, Germany, 2011
- Infecting the City 2012 festival, Cape Town
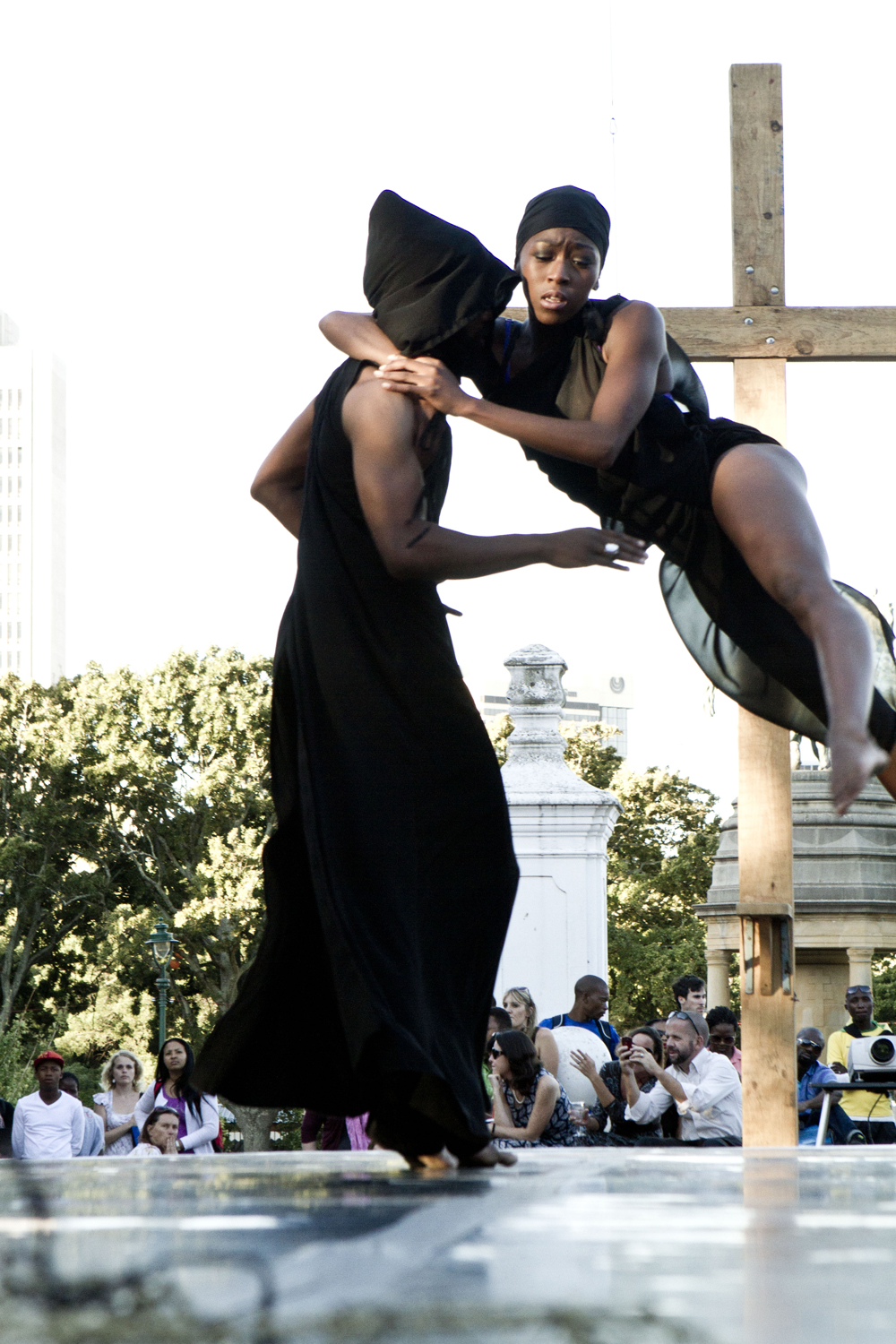
Death & Maidens

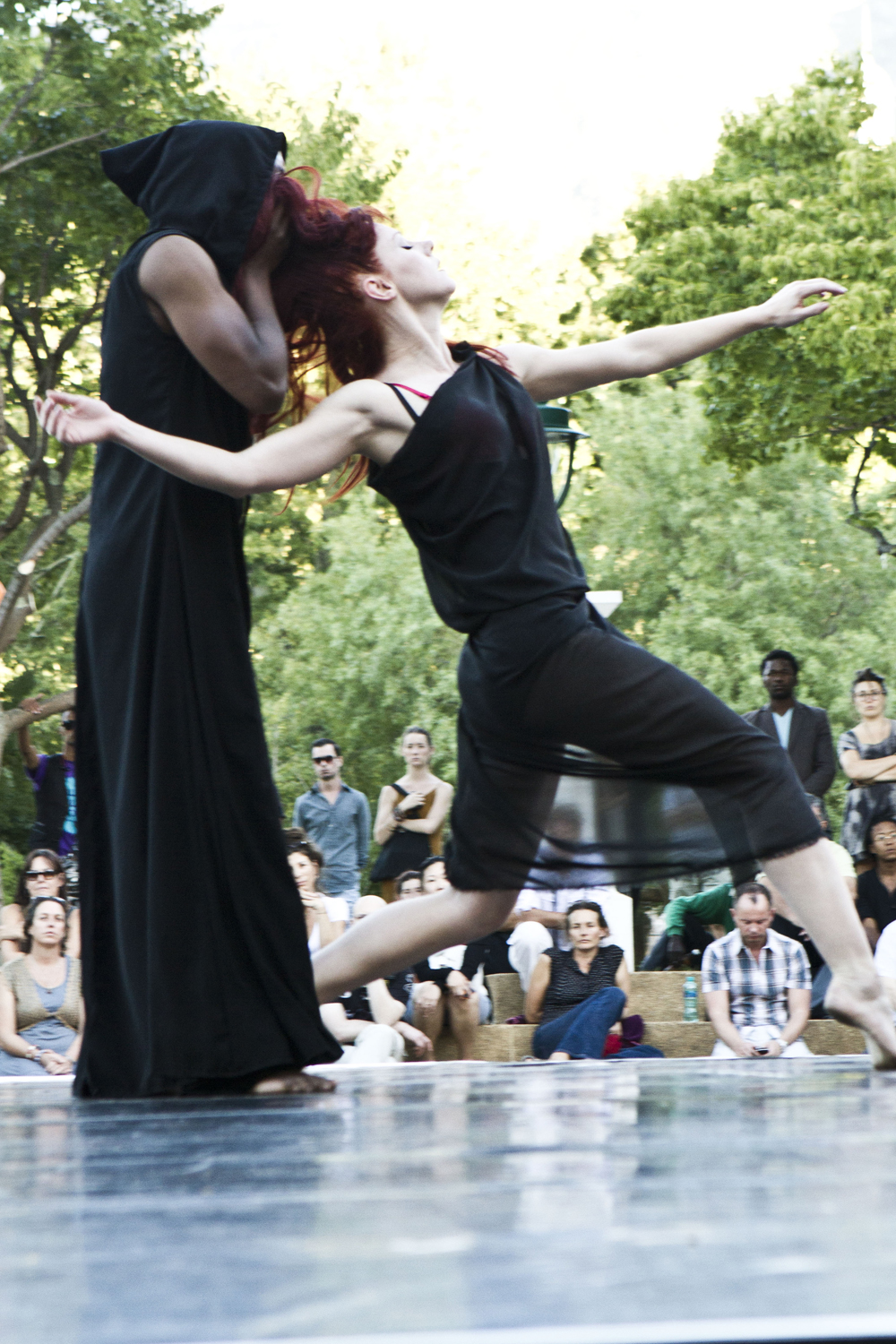
Death & Maidens

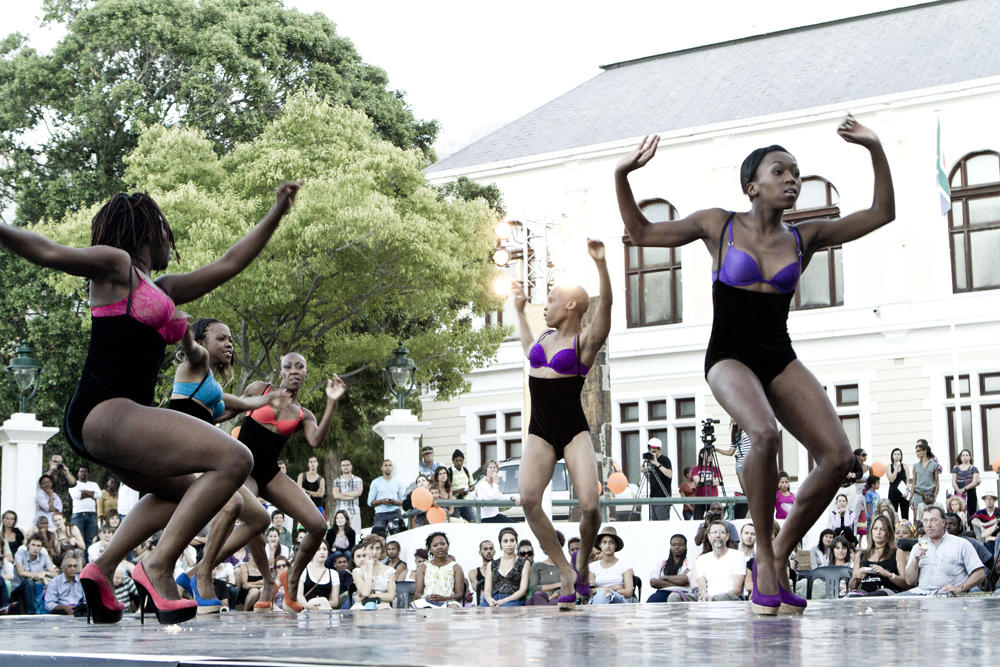
Death & Maidens, at Infecting the City

== Awards ==
Masilo achieved a Gauteng Arts and Culture MEC Award in 2006, as the Most Promising Female Dance in a Contemporary Style. She was recipient of the Standard Bank Young Artist Award in 2008. She received a Premio Positano Léonide Massine, an Italian lifetime achievement award for classic and contemporary dance, in September 2024. The City of Johannesburg named Masilo one of 44 "artistic icons in the City of Gold" in 2024, with a star carved into the wall of the Soweto Theatre.

== Works ==
=== Classical ballets ===
- Romeo and Juliet, 2008
- Carmen, 2009
- Swan Lake, 2010
- Giselle, 2017

=== Original works ===
- The Bitter End of Rosemary, 2011, based on Ophelia
- Dancing with Dada, 2011
- The Sacrifice based on Pina Bausch's Frühlingsopfer, 2021
