= Jay Pather =

- Born: Durban, South Africa
- Known for: Dance, Performance Art
- Awards: FNB Vita Awards for Best Choreography; Brett Kebble Art Award

Jay Pather is a South African curator, choreographer, and director working in Cape Town. He is the director of Siwela Sonke Dance Theatre and an associate professor at the University of Cape Town. Pather has been involved in the choreography and direction of over one hundred productions in South Africa and even more internationally.

== Education ==
- MA in Dance Theatre from New York University as a Fulbright Scholar in 1984
- Honours degrees in Literature and Drama from the University of Durban-Westville
- Performance Diploma from Trinity College London

== Career ==
2012:

- Chairperson, National Arts Festival Artistic Committee
- Curator, Infecting the City
- Director, Gordon Institute for Performing and Creative Arts (GIPCA)
- Artistic director, Siwela Sonke Dance Theatre
- Associate Professor, University of Cape Town

2010:

- Curatorial team, Spier Contemporary

2007:

- Co-curator, Spier Contemporary

2004:

- World Social Forum, Mumbai, India
- Its Festival, Amsterdam
- Festival of Dhow Countries, Zanzibar
- Personal Affects Exhibition, New York City, the Cathedral of St John the Divine and the Museum for African Art
- Resident Choreographer, Jazzart Dance Theatre
- Senior Lecturer, University of Zululand
