= Space for Pan African Research Creation and Knowledge =

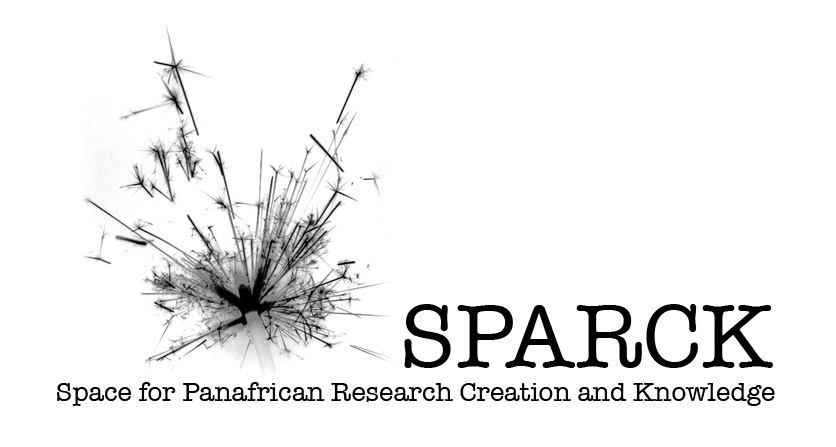

General information
- Name: Space for Pan African Research Creation and Knowledge
- Year founded: 2008
- Website: SPARCK

Senior staff
- Director: Kadiatou Diallo and Dominique Malaquais

Space for Pan African Research Creation and Knowledge (SPARCK) is a multi-sited, multi-disciplinary project founded in 2008 in collaboration with The Africa Centre. It is structured around a series of residencies for artists from across Africa and the African diaspora working in numerous media and styles, a wide range of exhibitions, installations, performances, screenings, Internet link-ups, publications, round-table discussions and workshops. Its initiatives are directed at a diverse body of the public and actively engaged local communities.

== About ==
SPARCK is a triennial endeavour. Its first three-year initiative (2009–2011) was entitled "Net / Works: Trans-Local Cultures in the Making of African Worlds.” This initiative explores intersections between creativity in multiple fields (visual, performance and new media arts; the spoken and written words; on-the-ground and in-the-virtual-world activism) and emergent urban spaces in the African world. It brings Cape Town and South Africa into a lively exchange with networks of urban artists, activists and scholars from three countries: Nigeria, the Democratic Republic of Congo and Senegal.

Through its multiple projects, SPARCK aims to foster cross-disciplinary and trans-local partnerships and endeavours, to promote dialogue and exchange that transcends the boundaries of age, social class, gender, as well as spatial, professional and ethnic difference.

=== Arts Residencies ===
==== Diary of a Paranoid Schizophrenic ====
SPARCK launched its first arts residency in March 2009 with artist, Kakudji. A controversial multi-media artist, Kakudji was invited to construct a two-part project in South Africa.

Part 1 took place in Johannesburg, during the first half March. The project, entitled "Urban Scenographies," brought together over 30 artists from four continents for a period of one month and gave rise to three events: a 3-day festival of performances, exhibitions and installations held in inner-city Johannesburg; a conference/performance at one of France's foremost experimental arts venues, Théâtre Paris-Villette; and a multi-disciplinary installation at Art Basel. An experimental video by Kakudjii about the Scenographies project was featured in all three settings.

Part 2 of Kakudji's residency took place In Cape Town from 16 March to 16 April 2009. Alongside video and still photography documenting his encounter with the "Mother City," Kakudji produced a body of some fifty collages. In these works, Kakudji made use of local currency to frame his perceptions of the city and more broadly of South Africa. Thematically and formally, the work focused on notions of deal-making: how things are made and un-made, done and undone and how economies of violence (monetary, political, social) are developed and implemented through such processes.

==== Ground | Overground | Underground ====
Mowoso, a Congolese trans-disciplinary collective, began "Ground | Overground | Underground" in July 2009 and had their first showing in November 2012 at Afropolis. The intention of the project was to tell the story of the path African man travels from his home continent to the West, the centre of 21st century digital globalisation. The project began with a series of videos filmed in Mbandaka, Kinshasa, and Mikili, and used the materials collected in these places to evolve into a performance, installation, and architecture. Using various materials, the project sought to call attention to the bombardment of electronic technology overtaking the world and, more specifically, the devastation caused in the Congo by the West's mad rush for coltan.

==== Neoliberal Machine ====
"Neoliberal Machine" was a product of the collaboration of Eza Possibles, an arts collective of the Democratic Republic of Congo, and OKUP, a French arts collective, over the course of three years from 2009–2012. The project incorporated a wide range of media, including web arts, cartography, video, performance, installation arts, collage and painting. The focus of the project is the "art of the deal" in the contemporary global economy.

==== WiAiA – World into Art into Africa ====
"WiAiA" was a workshop that took place in 2009 to discuss how contemporary art produced in Africa and the diaspora is and should be written about. It sought to find alternatives to the shallowness and cliches that mark much writing surrounding African art, and questioned how to more adequately address the relevance of African art in global cultural exchange.

==== South-South Conversations ====
The South-South Conversations began in 2010–2011 as a series of one-month residencies by photographers in three cities in Africa and then three cities of the African Diaspora in Southern Asia. Though the focus was initially photography, the project quickly evolved to include also experimental video, prose, sound, and internet interventions.

==== Photographic Journeys ====
Photographic Journeys was a 6-city, 9-artist residency from 2009–2011 that sought to challenge preconceived notions about informal, parallel, and other undervalued economies. The philosophy of the project was that the terms "informal" and "parallel" further marginalise these economies that are actually common to the majority of people on the planet. Through this project, artists explored the global dynamics that relate to these practices and the human condition in the late capitalist world.

==== Totems ====
Totems is a movable installation by Herve Youmbi, a Cameroonian visual artist. The project examines the impact of globalised capitalism on African art, in two parts: an ephemeral architectural space made of travel bars, and a photo exhibition of portraits of artists from the "developing world." In the photographs, the artists wear sunglasses whose lenses have been covered by the logos of major museums, art fairs, galleries, or auction houses, intended to suggest, among other things, admiration, envy, and alienation.

==== Urban Scenographies ====
Artists Mega Mingiedi and Androa Mindre held one-month residencies in Dakar, Senegal from December 2012 to January 2013 to explore issues of urban public and common space, body politics and theatricality in the neighbourhood of Ouakam. The produce of their residencies was a public performance piece in which they turned themselves into living incarnations of temporary restaurants or other meeting places on street corners in Kinshasa.

=== Events ===
In early 2009, SPARCK's directors, Kadiatou Diallo and Dominique Malaquais, were invited to participate in Transmediale, an international festival of contemporary art and digital culture held in Germany. The festival, based in Berlin, showcases cutting-edge arts projects exploring the impact of new technologies on cultures worldwide, through exhibitions and installations, film and video programmes, live performances, publications, conferences and discussion panels linking live audiences with online participants.

The SPARCK team participated in two discussion sessions. The first was entitled "Re-Hacking Your world: Sensible Software.” It focused on emergent digital and cellular cultures in Africa and activist / artistic possibilities arising from these. The second session, entitled “Critical Consumer Practice,” centred on the work of one of SPARCK's collaborators, a new media collective based in Kinshasa called Mowoso. The session was a live, online collaboration between Mowoso and SPARCK, linking Kinshasa and Berlin in real time with discussants on four continents, around an experimental performance and a debate about a highly contentious subject: the trade in Coltan, a metal essential to the production of cell phones, which has had a powerful and violent impact on vast swaths of Central and Eastern Africa.

In April 2009, SPARCK participated in a colloquium on African urbanism hosted by the African Centre for Cities (ACC) at the University of Cape Town. This was the first in a series of three encounters, to take place over the next three years, bringing together artists and academics around novel ways of thinking about cities in Africa. SPARCK's participation in this process grows out of a broader collaboration between SPARCK and the colloquium organisers, Edgar Pieterse, founder and director of the ACC, and AbdouMaliq Simone, Professor of sociology at Goldsmiths College, University of London, both of whom have played a key role in developing the ideas and practices that underlie SPARCK.
