= Brett Bailey =

South African playwright, artist, designer and director

- Born: 1967 (age 58–59)
- Education: Amsterdam DasArts
- Writing career
- Subjects: Colonial and post-colonial Africa
- Notable work: House of the Holy Afro

Brett Bailey (born 1967) is a playwright, artist, designer, play director, festival curator and the artistic director of the group Third World Bun Fight. He was the curator of South Africa's only public arts festival, Infecting the City, in Cape Town, South Africa, from 2008 until 2011. His works have played across Europe, Australia and Africa, and have won several awards, including a gold medal for design at the Prague Quadrennial (2007).

== History ==
Brett Bailey was born in 1967 and completed a postgraduate diploma in performance studies at the DasArts Master of Theatre in Amsterdam. He has worked throughout South Africa, and in Zimbabwe, Uganda, Haiti, the UK and across Europe. His acclaimed iconoclastic dramas, which interrogate the dynamics of the post-colonial world, include Big Dada, Ipi Zombi, iMumbo Jumbo and Orfeus. His performance installations include Blood Diamonds: Terminal and Exhibit A: Deutsch Sudwestafrika. He directed the opening show at the 4th World Summit on Arts and Culture (2009), and from 2006 until 2011 directed the opening shows for the Harare International Festival of the Arts. He has been the curator of Africa Centre's Infecting the City since 2008.

== Works ==
The work of Bailey investigates the many layers and intricacies of colonial and post-colonial Africa.

Bailey's earlier works – Ipi Zombi, iMumbo Jumbo and The Prophet – are grouped together under the title Plays of Miracle and Wonder (which is the title of a book on Bailey's plays) and incorporate ceremony and sacrament. These works are aggressive with Bailey using drums, screams, knives and broken glass to break down the audiences' defences.

In Ipi Zombi, Bailiey evoked a 1996 witch-hunt in which several women were blamed and killed for the death of twelve boys in a minivan accident. It combined Xhosa and Christian ritual. Author Zakes Mda claimed Ipi Zombi to be a "A work of genius that maps out a path to a new South African theatre ..."

In other works, such as Orfeus, Bailey takes a softer approach, and looks to highlight the blind, forgotten, the broken and the voiceless. In Orfeus, specifically, the audience is drawn down into an African underworld that is governed by a seedy businessman. Orfeus, and other works, look at a post-colonial, showing a "decaying globalised world in which not only shamanic rituals but also moving music create an entirely unique African atmosphere".

First staged in 2004 in Bern, Switzerland, House of The Holy Afro has been repeatedly staged in Europe and Australia with its last iteration at the Market Theatre Laboratory, Johannesburg, in June 2010. Performer and drag diva Odidi Mfenyana played the high priest of the holy house, and lead the performance through an urban funk cabaret that bordered on spiritual ritual.

In the site-specific work medEia, the audience walked in silence for at least ten-minutes before the production. The audience's emotional and intellectual journey through works were physically manifest in the installations Blood Diamonds: Terminal and Exhibit A: Deutsch Sudwestafrika.

Exhibit A: Deutsch-Südwestafrika, staged in the Museum of Ethnology in Vienna's Hofburg Palace, is a "meditation on the dark history of European Racism in relation to Africa".

For the 4th World Summit on Arts and Culture, Bailey presented 3 Colours – a one-off mixed media performance piece. Bailey collaborated with award-winning choreographer Gregory Maqoma and Congolese musician Mapumba Cilombo. The piece represented the complexities of inter-culturalism, in which Bailey "chose to portray different societies or cultures symbolically as shrines. Indefinable as they are, our cultures are sacred to us. At the heart of each glows a unique cluster of precious jewels; our myths and histories, our heritage, our values and social structure, our cosmology, and relationship to the ultimate."

Bailey's curated the Infecting the City Festival from 2008 until 2011. It is currently Africa's biggest public arts festival that takes place in the public spaces of Cape Town during February or March of every year. During Bailey's tenure, the Festival chose a theme that had social relevance: "In a society that has as many complex issues as ours, if one is commandeering the communal spaces of the city, it is not enough merely to provide entertainment for the public. There is a moral imperative to tackle the pressing issues of our day, and to ask artists to apply themselves to these."

"Exhibit B" was a highly controversial traveling exhibit that began in 2010. Inspired by 19th century human zoos, it was seen by more than 25,000 people in 14 countries before the end of 2014. Museum and theater directors joined to decry attempts at censorship after the work sparked protests around the world for its use of black actors in cages and chains, often in theatres well known for featuring almost no Black people in their repertoire.

== Productions ==
- Jury of Prague Quadrennial – the International Exhibit of Scenography & Theatre Architecture: 2011
- Curator of Infecting the City: the Spier Public Arts Festival in inner-city Cape Town: February 2008 – February 2011
- Creator of opening concert of Harare International Festival of the Arts (HIFA): 2006, 2007, 2008, 2009 and 2011
- Director of opening performance at the World Summit on Arts & Culture in Johannesburg: 2009
- Wrote and directed biographical performance on Nelson Mandela for his 90th birthday party in Qunu, Eastern Cape, 2008.

== Performances ==
Exhibit A: made with Namibian Performers and Musicians, writer/director/designer

- 2010 – Vienna Festival and Theaterformen Festival in Braunschweig

Orfeus: writer/director/designer

- 2006 – Cape Town
- 2007 – National Festival of the Arts (main program)
- 2009 – Vienna Festival and Holland Festivals
- 2011 – Theaterformen Festival, Hannover

macbEth: the opera: director/designer (written by Verdi)

- 2001 – Cape Town
- 2002 – Pretoria
- 2007 – Cape Town

House of the Holy Afro: director/designer

- 2004 – Bern
- 2005 – Vienna Festival; Berlin; Brussels; Reunion Island
- 2006 – Melbourne, Commonwealth Games
- 2007 – Edinburgh Fringe Festival; Harare; Umea, Sweden
- 2008 – Sydney Festival; Zurich Spektakel
- 2009 – Perth and Adelaide Festivals, Australia. Linz European Capital of Culture programme and Rich Mix in London
- 2010 – Market Theatre Johannesburg

Talking Heads: developed concept

- 2008 – 2011, Infecting the City festival

medEia: director/designer (written by Oscar van Woensel)

- 2003 – Johannesburg
- 2005 – Cape Town

Big Dada: the rise and fall of Idi Amin: director/designer/writer

- 2001 – Barbican Centre, London; Amsterdam; National Festival of the Arts (main program); Cape Town
- 2005 – Vienna Festival; Brussels; Berlin; Johannesburg; Cape Town

Vodou Nation: made in Haiti, director/designer/writer

- 2004 – London and 17 other UK cities

iMumbo Jumbo: writer/director/designer

- 1997 – National Festival of the Arts (main program); Johannesburg
- 2003 – Barbican Centre, London; Cape Town

Safari: C. G. Jung in Africa: made in Uganda, director/writer/designer

- 2003: Kampala, Uganda; Amsterdam, Rotterdam and 13 other Dutch cities

The Prophet: director/writer/designer

- 1999: National Festival of the Arts (main program)

Ipi Zombi: writer/director/designer

- 1998: National Festival of the Arts (main program); Cape Town; Harare

== Awards ==
- 1998: iMUMBO JUMBO: FNB Vita Awards for best director, original script and design.
- 2001: Standard Bank Young Artist of the Year for drama; Big Dada presented at the National Arts Festival: Fleur Du Cap's Rosalie van der Gught Award for Best Young Director;
- 2002: Fleur du Cap Awards/FNB Vita (Cape) award for Best Script of a New South African Play, and Best Costume Design for Big Dada;
- 2004: Honourable Mention for Brett Bailey's book The Plays of Miracle and Wonder at the Noma Award for Publishing in Africa
- 2007: medEia won a gold medal for design at the Prague Quadrennial;

== Installations ==
- Blood Diamonds: Terminal at National Festival of the Arts
- Exhibit A: Deutsch SudwestAfrika

== Publications ==
- The Plays of Miracle and Wonder – the texts of Third World Bunfight: 2001
- Published articles in The Theatre Review (TDR) and the South African Theatre Journal (SATJ)
- Feature on Brett Bailey by Daniel Larlham in the Yale Theatre Quarterly, 2009
