= Anthene juanitae =

Juanita's hairtail

Scientific classification
- Kingdom: Animalia
- Phylum: Arthropoda
- Class: Insecta
- Order: Lepidoptera
- Family: Lycaenidae
- Genus: Anthene
- Species: A. juanitae

Binomial name
- Anthene juanitae Henning & Henning, 1993

Species of butterfly

Anthene juanitae, otherwise known as the Juanita's hairtail, is a butterfly of the family Lycaenidae. It is found in Limpopo, South Africa, in dense riverine vegetation along the Olifants River.

The wingspan is about 25 mm (0.98 in) in males and 27–29 mm (1.1–1.1 in) in females. The species was named for the South African politician Juanita Terblanche, whose then husband Reinier Terblanche was responsible for discovering it.
