= Through The Lens Collective =

The Through The Lens Collective, also known by the acronym TTLC, is a South African artistic educational organization and creative agency. Focusing on lens-based art forms, the Collective was founded in 2018 by the photographer and educator Michelle Loukidis.

A major goal of the organization is to correct the historic erasure and misrepresentation that the colonial elite encouraged during the colonial period on the African continent when it comes to the photographic and cinematic arts.

== Prominent TTLC members ==
- Maheder Haileselassie
- D. M. Terblanche
- Rachel Seidu
- Caroline Sohie
- Stefanie Langenhoven
- Neemo Mungai
- Yassmin Forte
- Nadia Ettwein
