= Hannelie Coetzee =

Hannelie Coetzee is a Johannesburg-based visual artist and professional photographer. Her work spans social documentary photography, visual arts, and collaborative art projects.

== Education ==
Hannelie Coetzee matriculated from Estcourt high School in 1989. Coetzee received a BTech degree in photography from the Vaal University of Technology (1990–1994) and an Advanced Diploma in Fine Arts at Witwatersrand University from the Wits Fine Arts Department (1996–1997).

== Work ==
Coetzee has worked as a photographer for more than twenty years, specializing in social documentary photography. She has worked alongside Non Governmental Organizations (NGOs) as well as corporate companies to capture their social investment and development projects. She is represented by Aurora Photos in New York.

In March 2002, Coetzee launched her first solo exhibition, the Bossie Series at the Bell-Roberts Photographic Gallery in Cape Town. ArtsLink commented that "Even though this series can be described as traditional photography, Hannelie Coetzee has put her own spin on things...She creates a sensual, almost velvet surface that challenges conventional photography."

In November 2009, Coetzee won a PPC Young Concrete Sculptor merit award for her piece "Webcam Two Faces," a pixelated webcam self-portrait rendered in a mix of concrete and stone. The judges found it "exceptionally interesting."

Recently, Coetzee has been working with discarded/processed stone. She began by photographing stone and then transitioned into collecting stone, making stone mosaics, and ultimately creating stone sculptures. Collecting, rearranging and documenting stone out of place has become a theme in her work for the past 10 years.

As well as various site specific works around South Africa, such as Infecting the City and the Site Specific Land Arts festival, Coetzee has done several works in Johannesburg to reconnect with her roots in the city. A large commissioned work made of mining core, "The Change Agent", was unveiled in February 2012 in the Maboneng Precinct on the facade of a new building, The Main Change. In March 2012, Coetzee created a temporary piece titled "Buigkrag" at the Nirox Sculpture Park in Gauteng dealing with our relationship to energy. It is now a part of the Nirox permanent collection.

Coetzee collaborates with Usha Seejarim on Such Initiative, a Section 21 Company established in 2009 and an eco-conscious public arts organization. Such Initiative's vision is "changing perceptions through eco-conscious public art." The public art created through Such Initiative is a participatory process involving experts as well as community members. The materials and processes are eco-conscious and tailored to the community. She conducts walkabouts in which she personally tours her public art in Fordsburg, Braamfontein, and Maboneng with groups of 40–50 people.

== Exhibitions ==
- 2002 Bossie Exhibition as Bell-Roberts
- 2004: Lomo Exhibition
- 2006: Freestyle at Afronova
- 2007: Jive Soweto at Hector Peterson Museum
- 2008: Aardklop at Snowflake
- 2009: PPC merit award at Pretoria Art Museum
- 2009: Domestic at Goethe on Main
- 2010: ‘Uitpak’ by Johannesburg Art Gallery
- 2010: ATKV by KKNK
- 2011: Ik ben een Afrikaner
- 2012: Ik ben een Afrikaner
