= Chris Hattingh =

South African politician

Chris Hattingh MP

Permanent delegate to the National Council of the Provinces
- In office 2015–2019
- Leader: Mmusi Maimane

Member of the Provincial Legislature for the North West
- In office 14 June 1999 – 12 November 2015

Member of the National Assembly for JB Marks
- Incumbent
- Assumed office 15 June 2024

Personal details
- Party: Democratic Alliance
- Spouse: Catharina Hattingh
- Relations: Hans Heinrich Hattingh (ancestor); D. M. Terblanche (grandchild); Douglas Stephen Bax (distant cousin)
- Children: Juanita Terblanche, Carina Serfontein, two others
- Occupation: Politician
- Profession: Pharmacist

Christian "Chris" Hattingh is a South African politician. A member of the Democratic Alliance (DA), a part of South Africa's Government of National Unity, he has served at various times in the local, provincial and national tiers of his country's government.

He was the longest-serving member of the North West Provincial Legislature before moving to the National Council of Provinces, the upper house of the national parliament in Cape Town, serving between 2015 and 2019. He was later a DA councillor in JB Marks Local Municipality. He is currently an MP in the National Assembly of South Africa.

== Background ==
A direct descendant of the Stellenbosch landowner Hans Heinrich Hattingh and his wife Susannah Visser Hattingh, Hattingh was born in Potchefstroom. He completed his school career at the Potchefstroom Gymnasium and did basic military training at the 4th Field Regiment and the School of Artillery. He served as a Citizen Force officer in various positions in the Regiment Potchefstroom University and finally for seven years as the commanding officer.

He started practising as a community pharmacist in Potchefstroom after obtaining a B.Sc. (Pharm) degree at the Potchefstroom University – a career he pursued until 1999.

== Career in politics ==
Upon first entering politics, Hattingh managed to win a seat on the Potchefstroom City Council in 1988 as an independent candidate, defeating his opponent from the National Party, the dominant party in the town at the time. He was re-elected on the same basis in 1995. He joined the Democratic Party, a previously small party that was on a rapid upward curve in minority constituencies, in 1998. This gave the DP its first elected seat in the North West. By 1999, Hattingh was elected provincial leader of the DP and was elected to the provincial legislature later the same year. He would hold both positions for 16 years. The party was renamed Democratic Alliance in 2000.

Hattingh led the North West DA to consistent growth in each national election, improving the party's position from the 1 seat earned in 1999 to win 4 seats in 2014. During his tenure the DA even briefly governed Tlokwe Local Municipality, which included Potchefstroom, in 2013 after their political opponents were divided by infighting. The move to take control of Tlokwe had been championed by his daughter Juanita, who was serving under him as the DA's constituency leader for Tlokwe at the time. Hattingh finally decided to step down as provincial leader in 2015, and left the legislature later the same year. Despite having been a firm critic of the governing African National Congress, he received a warm farewell from ANC officials, who commended him for his institutional knowledge and support to newer members.

After four years in the National Council of Provinces, he retired from the legislature in Cape Town and returned to Potchefstroom. He was the DA's candidate for a by-election that was held on 18 September 2019, but lost to the Freedom Front Plus candidate. Instead, Hattingh was elected on the PR list after the 2021 South African municipal elections and served for a few years as part of the DA caucus in JB Marks Municipality (formed after the merger of Tlokwe and Ventersdorp municipalities in 2016).

Hattingh was the DA Constituency Leader of JB Marks and Provincial Campaign Manager of the DA North West. He was awarded the honorary title of “Alderman” by the JB Marks Local Municipality on 28 February 2022.

On 15 June 2024, Hattingh was sworn in as a member of the National Assembly of South Africa in the 7th Parliament of the Republic of South Africa, having won a seat therein in the 2024 South African elections.

== Personal life ==
Hattingh is married to Catharina "Ina" Hattingh (née Wagner), a member of the Dednam family of 1820 Settlers. They have four children together: Juanita Terblanche (a politician), Carina Serfontein (also a politician), Isak Daniël Hattingh (a gynaecologist) and Christina du Toit (a trained filmmaker and current homemaker).
