= Nomthunzi Mashalaba =

Nomthunzi Mashalaba (born 1979) is a South African painter and visual artist. Her art has featured in international exhibitions including Map of the New Art in Venice, Crossing Boundaries in Qatar and The Art of Humanity at the Pratt Institute in New York.

== Early years and education ==
Mashalaba was born in 1979. She attended the Tshwane University of Technology, where she acquired a national diploma in Fine Art in 2004 and graduated in 2006, with a bachelor's degree in Fine Art.

== Career ==
After graduating from Tshwane University of Technology, Mashalaba began participating in exhibitions and workshops. She participated in numerous group shows in South Africa and an international workshop in Madagascar. In 2007, she held her first solo exhibition titled, Square and in 2012, she held her second titled Mamiya.

== Exhibitions ==
- Matters Conceptual, Erdmann Contemporary (2010)
- Crossing Boundaries, Qatar, VCUQ Art Gallery (2011)
- Something to Write Home About, Greatmore Studio (2011)
- Slices of Life, Infecting the City Festival in Cape Town (2011)
