= Juanita Terblanche =

South African politician

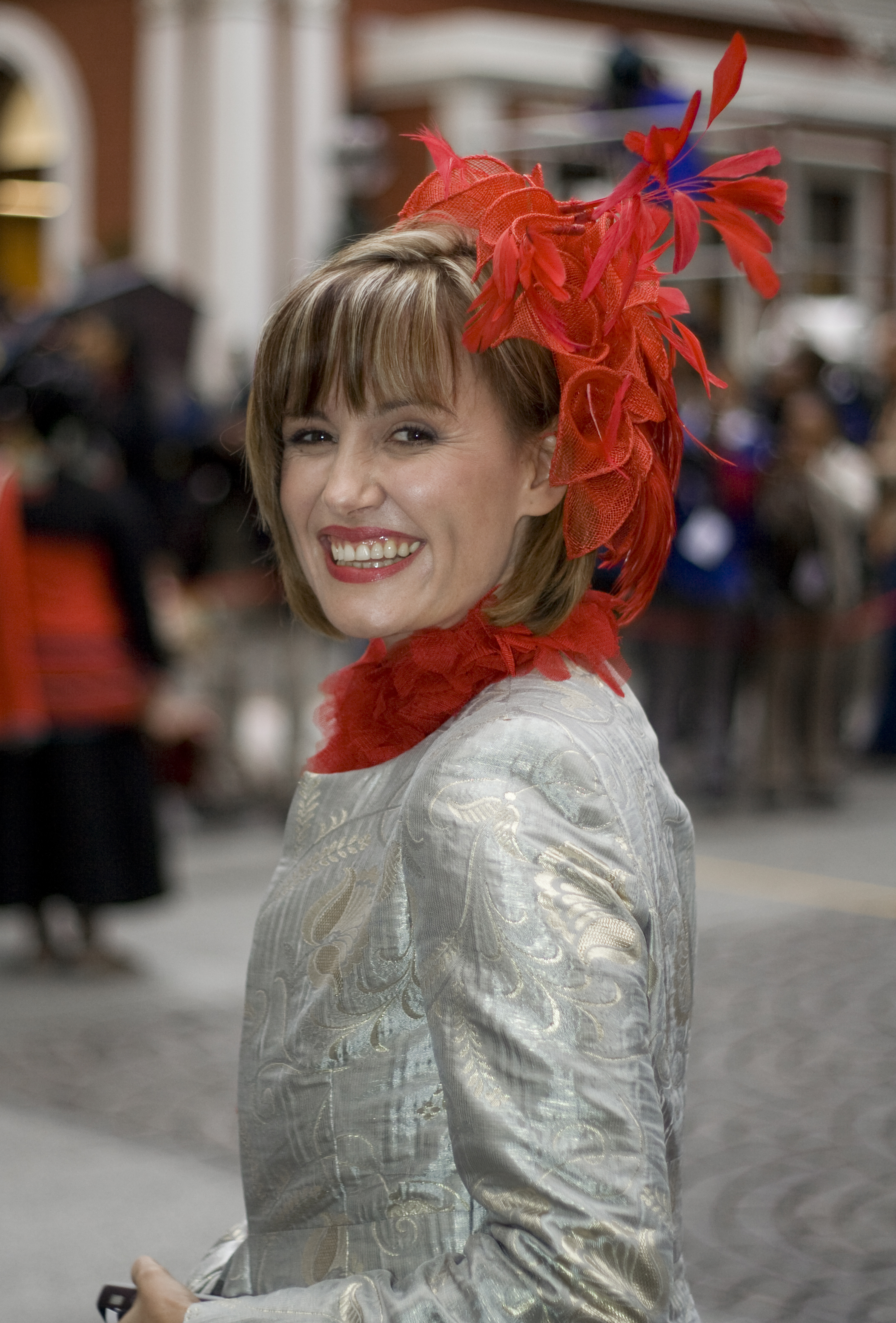

Shadow Minister of Home Affairs
- In office 2009–2014
- Leader: Athol Trollip; Helen Zille

Deputy Shadow Minister of Science and Technology
- In office 2014–2017
- Leader: Helen Zille; Mmusi Maimane
- Preceded by: Manie van Dyk

Member of the National Assembly
- In office 2009–2017

Permanent Delegate to the National Council of Provinces
- In office 2004–2009

Personal details
- Born: 14th of December, 1970 Potchefstroom
- Party: Democratic Alliance
- Spouse: Reinier Terblanche (1993-2024)
- Relations: Chris Hattingh (father); Carina Serfontein (sister); D. M. Terblanche (child); Douglas Stephen Bax (distant cousin); Hans Heinrich Hattingh (ancestor); Krotoa (ancestress); Paul Kruger (distant relative)
- Children: 3
- Education: Potchefstroom University

Johanna Fredrika Terblanche (née Hattingh, born 14 December 1970), popularly known as Juanita Terblanche, is a South African politician. Prior to 2017, she was a Member of Parliament with the Democratic Alliance and the Deputy Shadow Minister of Science and Technology.

Following her return to active politics in 2022, she was elected a branch chairperson of the party. She currently serves as a councillor of the JB Marks Local Municipality.

== Early life and education ==
Terblanche was born on 14 December 1970 to Chris and Ina Hattingh. Her father, a direct descendant of the Cape Colony free burgher Hans Heinrich Hattingh and his wife Susannah Visser, was a Potchefstroom City Councillor before joining what is now the Democratic Alliance and becoming a member of the North West Provincial Legislature. Her other ancestry includes descent from the Khoi interpreter Krotoa by way of the family of the Boer statesman Paul Kruger.

She attended Potchefstroom University, and graduated with a degree in Art History prior to entering politics.

== Career ==
In 1998, Terblanche's father crossed the floor to the Democratic Party and she joined politics as an activist. She took part in the 1999 campaign that brought him to the provincial legislature, then won a by-election on the platform of the DP with 76% of the vote to become the party's only councillor. By 2001, Terblanche was again a Potchefstroom City Councillor, having won 82% of the vote in her ward the previous year for the then newly re-christened Democratic Alliance. She also held office as caucus chair, and was the North West provincial secretary from 2000 until 2004.

In 2004, she was elected a member of the National Council of Provinces, where she was best known for passing a 2004 motion censuring Thabo Mbeki for his attitude to rape. At the beginning of the term, Terblanche was elected as whip in the chamber. During her time in the NCOP, she was temporarily ejected from the upper house for exclaiming in Afrikaans during a session. Upon the completion of her term in the upper chamber, she then became the member for the constituency of Ventersdorp/Tlokwe (Potchefstroom) in the National Assembly of South Africa, the country's lower house, in 2009.

From 2005 to 2006, she served as the first female Counsellor to the Leader of the Opposition, succeeding fellow MP Gareth Morgan. In 2009, she was the DA Home Affairs Spokesperson and again served as whip, this time in the lower house. During her time at the Home Affairs department, she debated its then prevalent reputation for corruption and graft, took part in the planning that preceded South Africa's hosting of the soccer world cup in 2010 and gave an interview following the ID card suicide. Terblanche also spoke on behalf of her party and constituency in the wake of the murder of white supremacist leader Eugene Terre'Blanche (whom she is not related to). In 2011, she was the Democratic Alliance's candidate for mayor of Potchefstroom. She also issued a statement about the spate of farm attacks in South Africa in 2012. Terblanche was the constituency leader for Tlokwe from 2004 until 2017. As a result, she was serving in this position when the DA briefly took control of the municipality in 2013, a move she championed.

In June 2014, Terblanche was named as Deputy Spokesperson in the Science and Technology portfolio. During her time with the department, her work included debating aspects of the Square Kilometer Array's South African location, South Africa's then gestational Space program, and the South African Indigenous Knowledge preservation and promotion bill.

In 2014, charges were laid against Deputy Minister for Higher Education Mduduzi Manana for, among other things, "manhandling" Terblanche in a brawl in parliament.

In 2015, she spoke out against the excessive use of force by the South African Police Service and praised the arrest of individuals that had been running an illegal initiation school. In October of that year, Terblanche was expelled from the Democratic Alliance, along with Dianne Kohler Barnard. The ANC called it a "public relations stunt." Terblanche said the misconduct inquiry that led to her expulsion was "erroneous, misleading and defamatory" and said she would appeal to the High Court.

She left parliament in 2017. Her membership of the Democratic Alliance was ultimately reinstated in February, 2022. She currently serves as one of the party's branch chairs in her native North West Province. Since 2024, she has also been a councillor in the JB Marks Local Municipality.

== Honours ==
Over the course of her career in politics, Terblanche was named as one of "the 200 young people that you should take to lunch" by the Mail and Guardian. She also received the Sunday Times award for "Upstart of the Year" and was further named as one of "the 100 young people that will make a difference in the next 10 years", again by the Mail and Guardian.

== Illness ==
In April 2010, Terblanche was diagnosed with acoustic neuroma. She subsequently had the first of three corrective surgeries on July 13 of that year.

After the three procedures were completed, some of the tumor remained due to both the nature of Terblanche's case in particular and the damage sustained during the final surgery.

She is currently continuing treatment.

== Personal life ==
From 1993 to 2024, Terblanche was married to the lepidopterist Reinier Terblanche. They have three children together; one of them is the award-winning photographer D. M. Terblanche.

Terblanche has a species of butterfly, the Juanita's Hairtail, named after her. Her then husband gave it its name as a wedding gift after discovering it.
