= Jazzart Dance Theatre =

General information
- Name: Jazzart Dance Theatre
- Previous names: Jazzart Contemporary Dance Company
- Year founded: 1973
- Founders: Sonje Mayo
- Website: http://www.jazzart.co.za/

Senior staff
- Company manager: Lorna Houston

Artistic staff
- Artistic Director: Jackie Manyaapelo
- Resident Choreographers: Ina Wichterich-Mogane, Mziyanda Mancam, Mzo Gasa

Jazzart Dance Theatre is a leading contemporary dance company in South Africa. It is known not only for its combination of Western and African styles, but also for its focus on social justice and community improvement. Jazzart Dance Theatre aims to be a transformative dance company that reflects the changing social environment of South Africa. Meanwhile, Jazzart's training programme provides dance theatre training and creative interventions to South African communities most in need of opportunities to express their artistic impulses.

== History ==
Jazzart was founded in 1973 by Sonje Mayo as a modern and jazz dance studio open to students of all races. Under the leadership of Sue Parker from 1978 to 1982, the studio evolved into a contemporary jazz school and part-time company, before it was handed over to Val Steyn. In 1986, Alfred Hinkel bought the company, changing artistic directorship to Dawn Langdown, John Linden and Jay Pather. Under this new leadership, the company adopted a philosophy that focused on the socio-political and economic context of their students and audiences. The group became increasingly political throughout the apartheid regime, structuring their teaching around the populist ethos of South African political struggle. Jazzart still strives to bring together all races in South Africa, often performing in disadvantaged communities across the nation.

=== Awards ===
- 1990 - AA Vita Award for Best Contemporary Choreography Bolero
- 1994/1995 - FNB Vita Award for Best New South African Production, Media
- 1996/1997 - FNB Vita Award for Best Contemporary Choreography Junction
- 1996/1997 - FNB Vita Award for Most Promising Dancer Sandile Mbili for Junction
- 1997 - Standard Bank Young Artist Award: Special Award for Dance Alfred Hinkel, for his vision, commitment and contribution to dance in South Africa
- 1997/1998 - FNB Vita Award for Best Choreography, Ukolu LoMzansi
- 1997/1998 - FNB Vita Award for Most Promising Performance by a Dancer in Contemporary Style, Celeste Botha
- 1997/1998 - FNB Vita Award for Best Dancer in Contemporary Style, Sandile Mbili
- 1998 - Gordon Reid Fellowship: Dance and Theatre, Alfred Hinkel
- 1998/1999 - FNB Vita Special Award for Cape Town Region Jazzart Dance Theatre for Duck 'n Dance
- 1999/2000 - FNB Vita Award for Most Promising Choreography Sbonakaliso Ndaba for Sprung 2
- 1999/2000 - FNB Vita Special Award for Consistent and Exceptional Performances Throughout the Last Year,. Ondine Bello
- 2000/2001 - FNB Vita Special Award for the Outstanding Season of Last Dance Jazzart Dance Theatre
- 2000/2001 - FNB Vita Award for Most Promising Performance by a Dancer in Contemporary Style, Elizma Wildschutte
- 2001/2002 - FNB Vita Award for Contemporary Choreography and Dance Jazzart Dance Theatre: Cape Town Region
- 2001/2002 - FNB Vita Award for Contemporary Choreography and Dance Namjive: Cape Town Region
- 2001/2002 - FNB Vita Award for Most Promising Performance by a Dancer in Contemporary Style Jackie Manyaapelo
- 2001/2002 - FNB Vita Award for Best Choreography in a Contemporary Style, Mark Fleishman and Alfred Hinkel in collaboration with the Jazzart dancers for Cold Waters/Thirsty Souls
- 2002 - FNB Vita Award for Best Choreography, Alfred Hinkel, John Linden and Dawn Langdown for Junction
- 2002 - FNB Vita Award for Most Outstanding Presentation of an Original Contemporary Dance Work, Alfred Hinkel, John Linden and Dawn Langdown for Junction
- 2002 - FNB Vita Award for Most Outstanding Presentation of an Ensemble Cast, Jazzart Dance Theatre for Junction
- 2002 - FNB Vita Award for Most Outstanding Performance by a Male Dancer in Contemporary Style, Luthando Ntsodo in Junction
- 2002- FNB Vita Choreographic Commission, Levern Botha created a work for FNB Dance Umbrella 2003
- 2004 - Tunkie Memorial Award for Outstanding Dedication and Leadership Alfred Hinkel
- 2006 - Western Cape Cultural Commission Award for Service to the Dance Community, Alfred Hinkel
- 2008 - Department of Cultural Affairs and Sport: Annual Cultural Award Alfred Hinkel

== Infecting the City 2012 ==
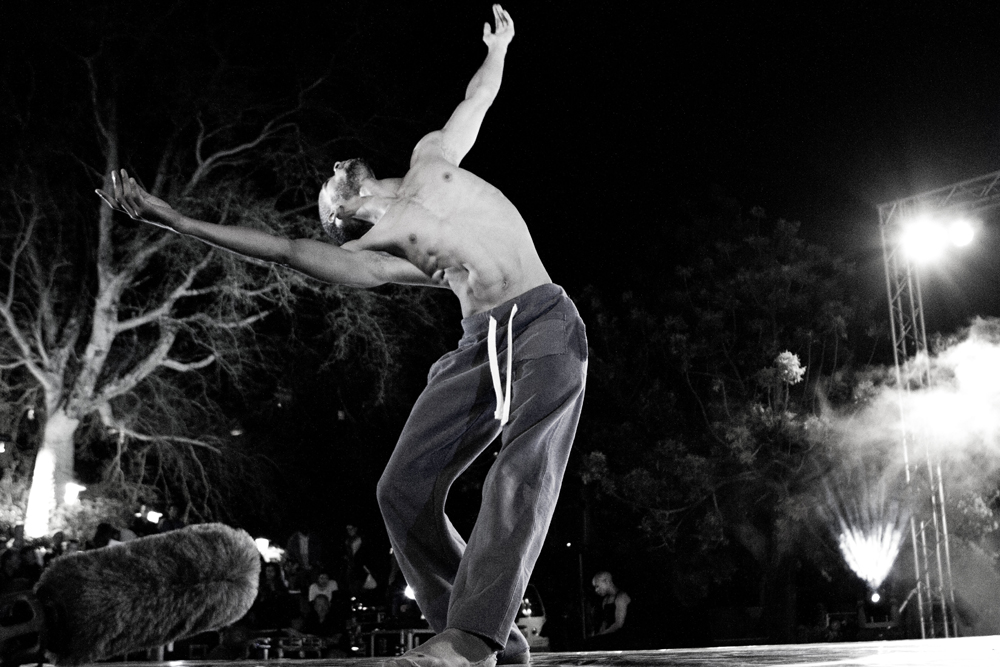
Infecting TheCity 2012, Cantico

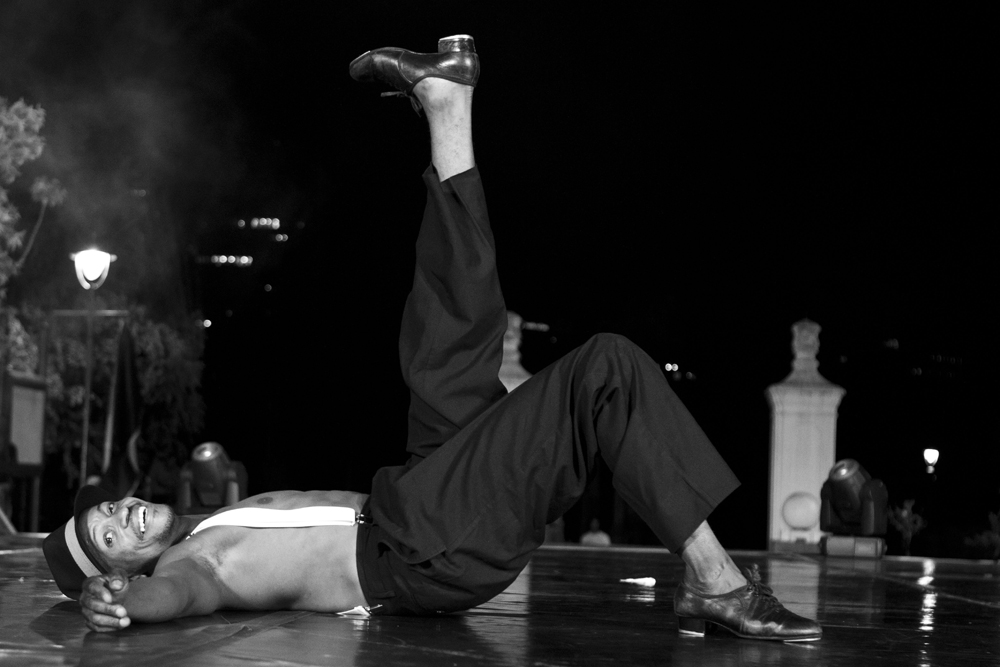
Infecting The City 2012, Cantico

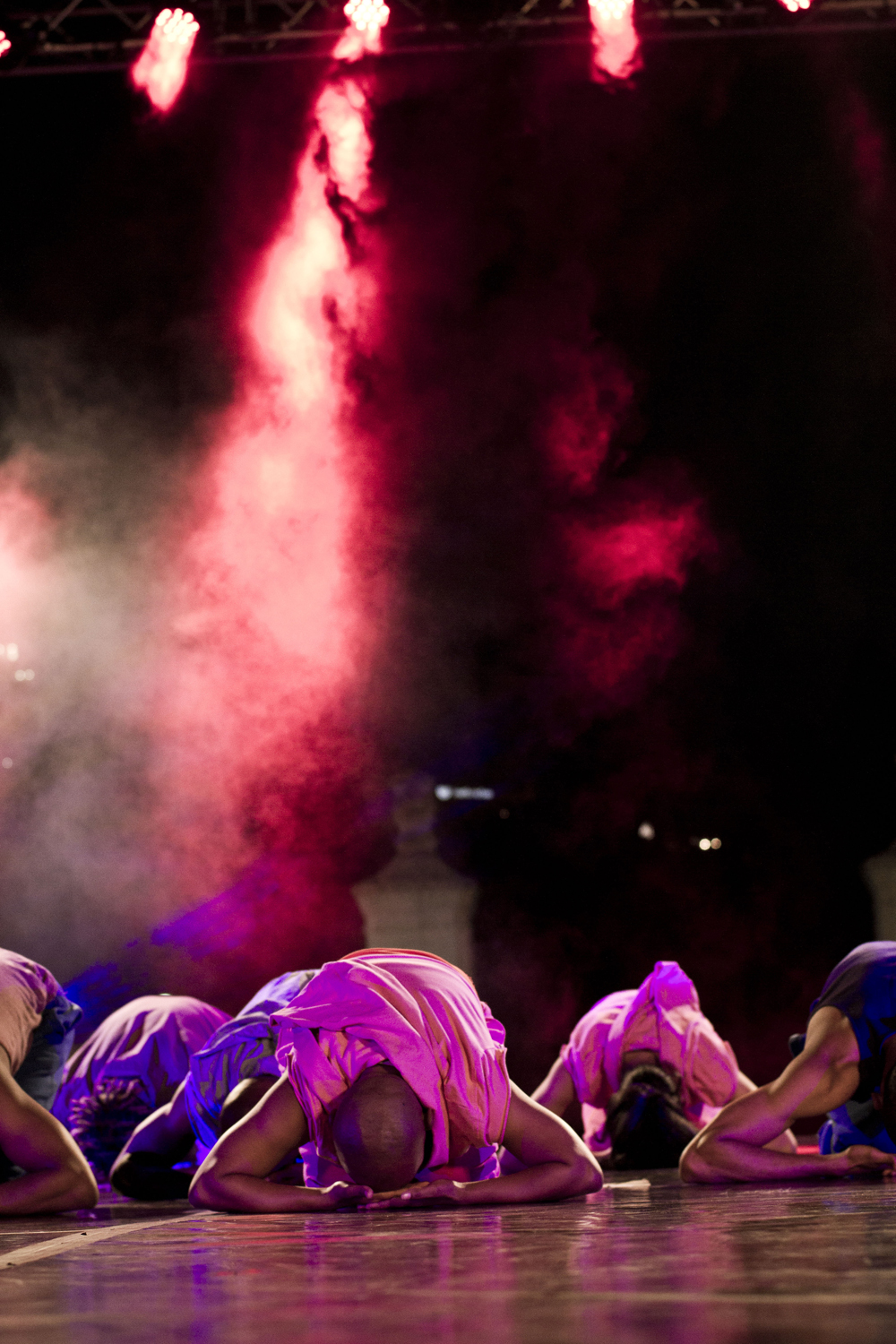
Infecting The City 2012, Cantico

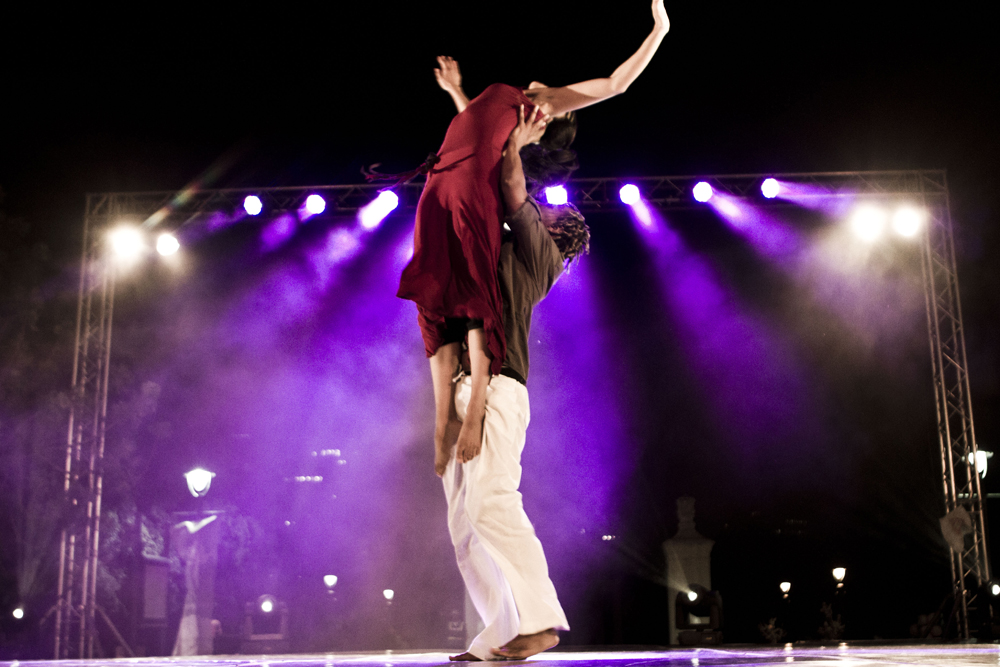
Infecting The City 2012, Cantico

== See also ==
- Dada Masilo, dancer
