= Infecting the City =

Arts festival in Cape Town, South Africa

Infecting The City Festival
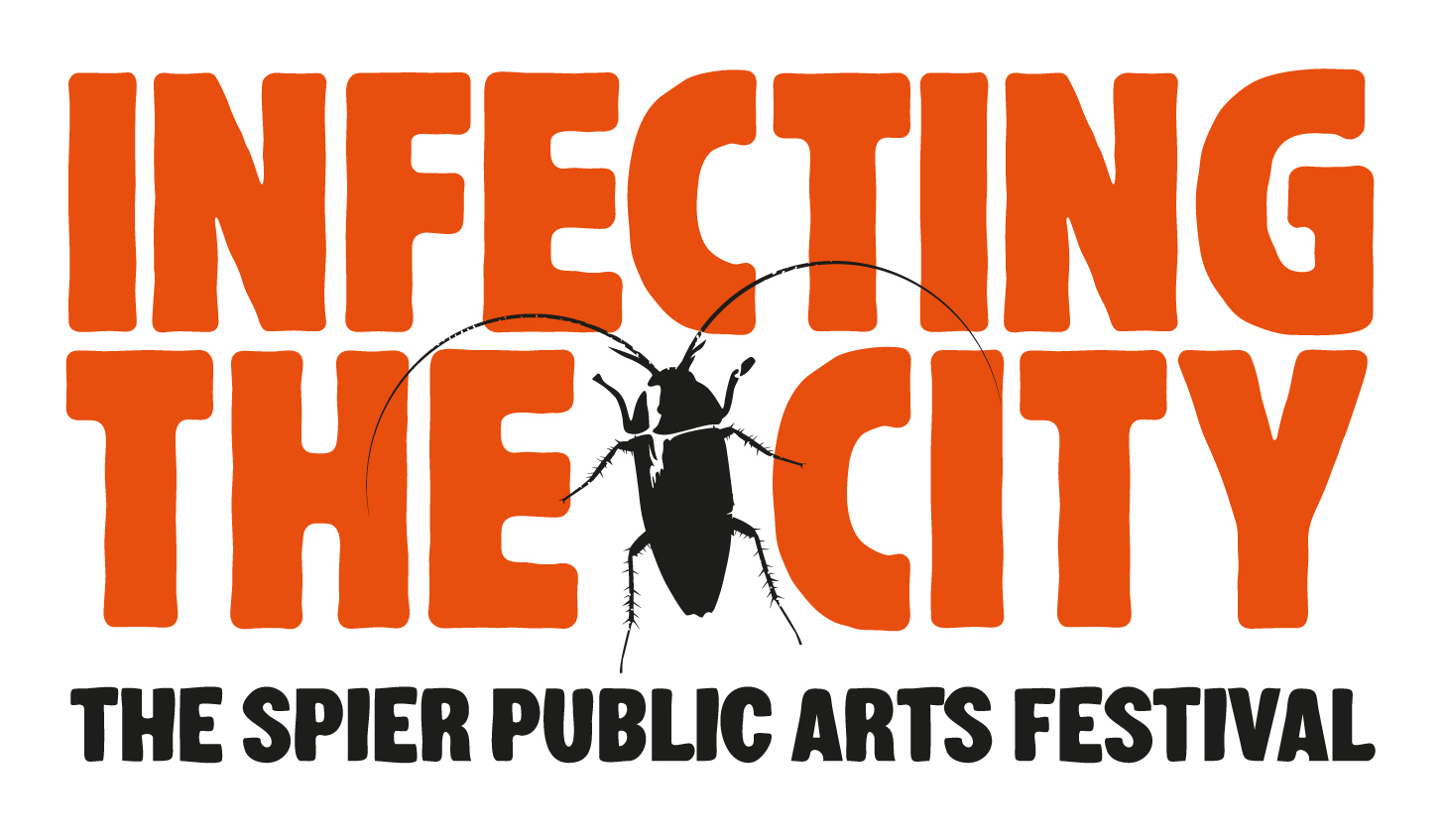
- Genre: Arts festival
- Dates: February annually
- Locations: Cape Town, South Africa
- Years active: 4
- Founded: 2007
- Attendance: 25,000
- Patron: Spier Wine Farm
- Website: www.infectingthecity.com

Infecting the City is a public arts festival in Cape Town, South Africa. The festival is committed to making art freely available to everyone. The festival hosts a range of different types of site-specific art, art intervention and performance art in the central part of the city. Each year the festival takes on a social issue or theme which the participating artists respond to. In 2011, the Festival worked with Cape Town's artistic and cultural community to present public art under the theme of Treasure. This theme was intended to celebrate the artistic traditions and contemporary practices of the diverse communities within South Africa and to explore Cape Town's "Afropolitan" reality.

Infecting the city is presented by the Africa Centre, a non-for-profit organisation that creates a platform for exploring contemporary Pan-African artistic practice as a tool for social change. Infecting the City is an integral part of the city, challenging audiences to notice hidden spaces and perspectives of Cape Town and providing an arts and cultural voice in Africa, for Africans.

== History ==
The festival started as Infecting The City Performing Arts Festival in 2008 with a "singular aggressive aim – to infect the city with performance that captures the complexities of our daily lives". The Festival was born to migrate some of the experiences of the now-disbanded Spier Summer Season on the Spier Wine Farm to the central part of Cape Town. The annual Spier Summer Season first started in 1996 and included diverse performances such as opera, comedy, poetry and music over a three-month period each year. In 2007, the Spier Arts Trust, the organisation which produced the Summer Season, discontinued the project. The Africa Centre, with funding from Spier, decided to continue the spirit of the Summer Season by creating a week-long performance art festival in the centre of Cape Town. Brett Bailey has curated the 2009, 2010 and 2011 iterations of the Infecting The City Festival.Jay Pather curated the festival in 2012

In 2010 the festival changed its name to Infecting the City Public Arts festival to incorporate visual art, public interventions and to better reflect what the Festival represented. Public art has traditionally functioned to popularise art – to challenge the elitist art culture of the galleries and bring art into the streets. Today, public art attempts to respond to the flexibility and cross-disciplinary nature of contemporary art practice combining artistic vision and community values. Public art offers the opportunity to challenge its audiences, breach boundaries, and shift the perspectives of public space. It is this vision of public art that the Festival aspires to.

Over the years the number of artists participating and audience attending has steadily grown with the 2011 Festival including 314 artists whose artworks were seen by over 25,000 people.

== Past festivals ==
Each festival is based around a theme. Each year, the theme refers to a social issue that is applicable to all and makes both the artists and the audience look at these social issues in new and transformative ways.

=== Festival 2011 ===
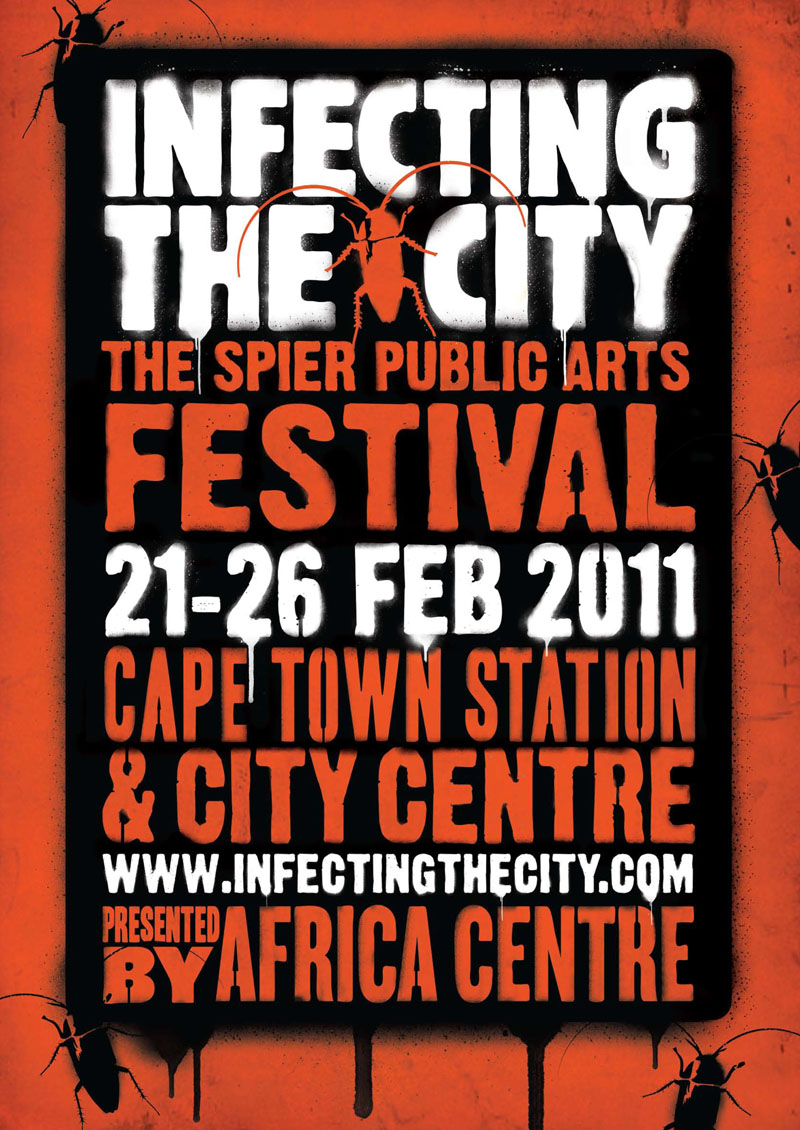
The poster for Infecting the City 2011 supporting its theme of Treasure

ITC 2011 was curated with the theme of TREASURE. The theme allowed artists to make art that highlighted the treasures from the city that the audience did not know of or had forgotten about. These treasures were then presented in four categories – cultural jewels, music gems, environmental waste and historic treasures. The categories were named: The Jewels, City Treasurers, Slices of Life and Music Gems.

Brett Bailey interviewed on 567 CapeTalk by presenter Aden Thomas

The festival opened on Monday, 21 February 2011 and lasted until Saturday, 26 February. The Festival Hub was at the Cape Town Station forecourt, but public arts events occurred every day at different public spaces around the city. The Jewels consisted of 15 local community groups that displayed a ritual, rite or cultural practice. The Jewels ranged from Rieldans to Drum Majorettes, from Xhosa Stick-fighting to Ratiep, and from opera and ballet to the Ethiopian Coffee Ceremony. Each of the 15 cultural gems was choreographed, by five theatre makers: Peter Hayes, Natalie Fisher, Fiona du Plooy, Celeste Botha and Sensei Ndlovu. The Jewels were performed on locally crafted Jewel Boxes (stages) twice a day. The Jewel Route led the audience from Jewel Box to Jewel Box through the city centre. There were 3 different Jewel Routes during the festival week.

The City Treasurers section was made up of well known visual and performance artists who used artistic interventions, performance pieces or public art to draw attention to historic or contemporary treasures in the city. Strand was a series of performance pieces that wove together the stories of Cape Town as a port. It took place twice daily on the Cape Town Station. Invisible Gold, Urban Diamonds and the Number 1 Unexpected Undercover Agency were artworks who differently looked at the people who make the city work. Relics of Place and Watermarks highlighted the waste of spring water flowing off the mountain and into the sea. The Treasurers included Peter Aerschmann, Doung Dala, Catherine Henegan, Nadine Hutton, Jethro Louw, Mafuta Ink, Owen Manamela, Anthea Moys, Myer Taub, Athina Vahla and Caron von Zeil.

Slices of Life was the title for the Festival's focus on eco waste. Eight environmental artists from Cape Town and Johannesburg (Igshaan Adams, Simon Max Banister, James Clayton, Hannelie Coetzee, Brendhan Dickerson, Heath Nash, Usha Seejarim, Nomthunzi Mashalaba) transformed recyclable garbage into artwork, with the purpose of drawing attention to valuable materials that most of us consider to be 'rubbish' and subsequently dispose of.

The Music Gems featured nine musical groups on a stage on the forecourt of Cape Town Station. Each group came from a different community and represented a different culture that lives in Cape Town: Delta Soetstemme, Loit Sols, Congolese Car Guard Quartet, Mac MacKenzie's Goema Symphony, Spaza Hip-Hop, Teiko Drumming, Zimbabwe's Madzishe, and the Zamanani Brothers. The programme was curated by Iain Harris.

=== Festival 2010 ===
ITC 2010 was held from 13 to 20 February. The theme for 2010 was HUMAN RITE, which investigates the role of rites and rituals as tools for transformation and healing.

The 2010 Festival was oriented around the theme Human Rite and asked artists to take a deep look at the dynamics of Cape Town society and to "creatively envision the kind of society that we want to live in". The artists were invited "to ask: What cries out for transformation or healing? Who needs to be included in the social fabric of the City?; and how do we amplify and liberate the energy of the CBD? The artists confronted Cape Town's collective demons and to put them to rest, to seek out silent memories and invisible stories, and to validate them, to look for what needs to be righted, and 'rited'. To broaden and deepen the way we experience the world we live in and to celebrate our fundamental human right to express who we are". The programme included installations that engage with Capetonians and visitors to Cape Town, choreographic works (Windows into a World, Dancing Jesus), large-scale collaborative performance art pieces (Imperfections, Meet Market, Quiet Emergency) and low key interventions (Grey Matter, Information People, Jump, Mandala for Healing, the Wishing Wall), as well as discussion forums (The Right to Respond. Participating artists came from Cape Town, Johannesburg, Grahamstown, Zimbabwe, China, UK, Greece, Germany, USA, Australia and the Netherlands.

=== Festival 2009 ===
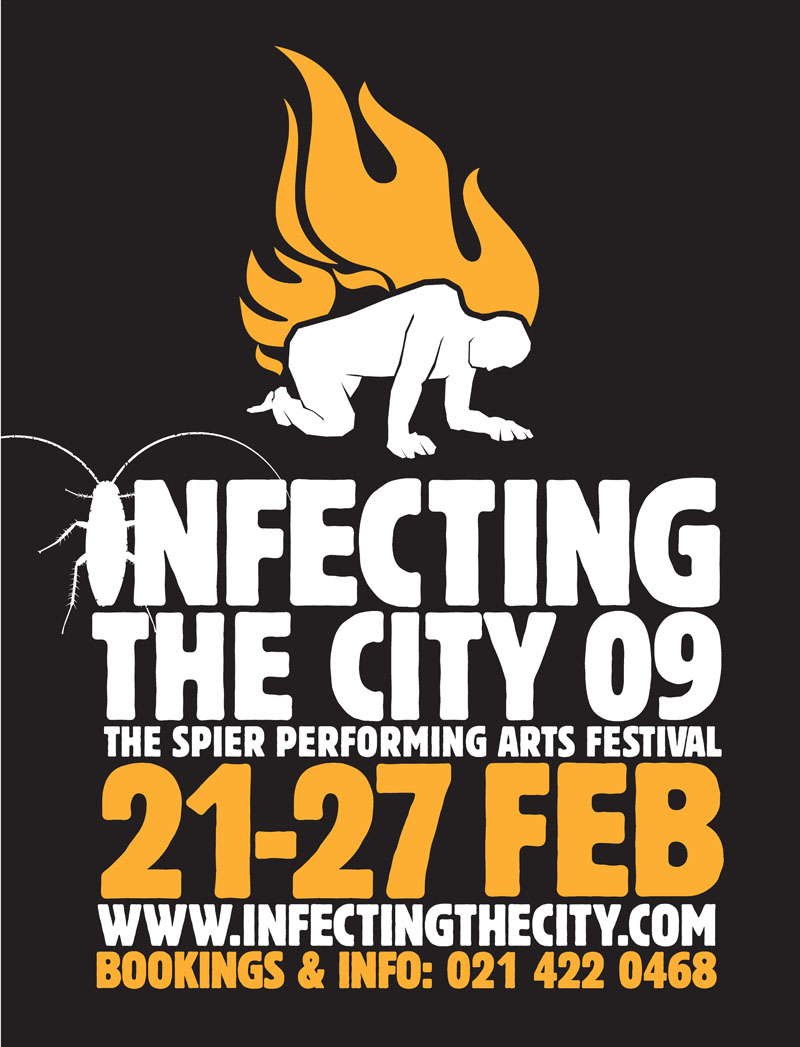
Infecting The City 2009 poster depicting the theme Home Affairs

ITC 2009 was held on Saturday, 21 February until Friday, 27 February. The theme for 2009 was: HOME AFFAIRS. In 2009, Infecting the City asked artists to grapple with the national tensions revealed in the 2008 xenophobic violence. The artists were asked to look at human displacement, migration, immigration, refugees and identity. Named after the government department that processes immigrants to South Africa, "Home Affairs" had works on the programme that deepened audience understanding of these complex and often disturbing issues. For a week, Infecting the City transformed Cape Town into a cutting edge theatre featuring works from local and international artists.

The programme included three artworks that were the result of the six-week Collaborative Course where twelve artists from South Africa, SADC countries and beyond SADC borders shared diverse skills and created artworks relating to the festival theme. Amakwerekwere, Exile and Limbo were the artworks that resulted from this process. Commissioned works included An Histrionic, Call Cutta in a Box, Eyton Road, Incwaba Lendoda Lise Cankwe Ndelela (The Grave of the Man is Next to the Road) and Tuning into the Void.

=== Festival 2008 ===
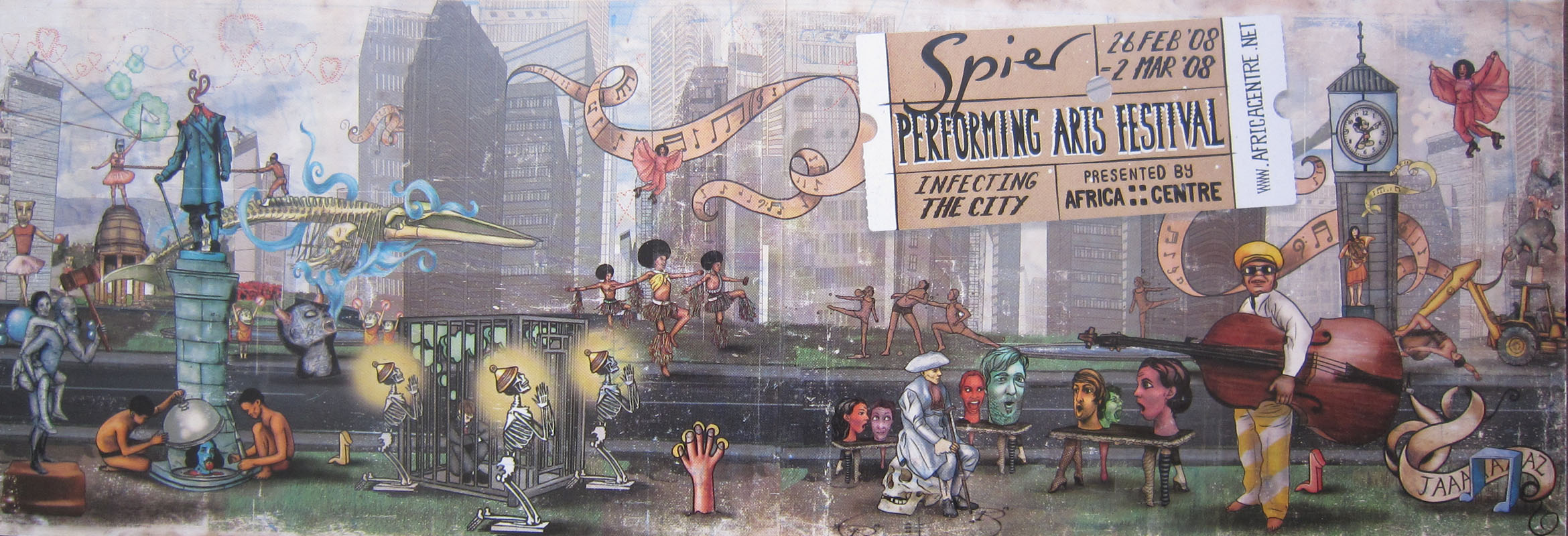
Poster for Infecting the City 2008

ITC 2009 was held from 26 February until 2 March 2008. The theme for 2008: TIME

The Spier Performing Arts Festival – Infecting the City – launched in Cape Town in February 2008 with the intention to "infect the city with performance that captures the complexities of our daily lives... The underlying intention is to feature works that bravely take on new ways of expression, of collaboration disciplines, and of integrating the classical and the contemporary".

The programme included commissioned new works (Dreamtime, I am Cinnamon), existing works relocated and restaged (Not with My Gun, Isivuno sama Phupha (Harvest of Dreams), Transport Exceptionnels, Misterios Da Actualidade) collaborative projects (An Order of Passage, 22 mins 37 sec, Waking Time), Talking Heads, and a workshop series.

=== Photographs of performances from past festivals ===
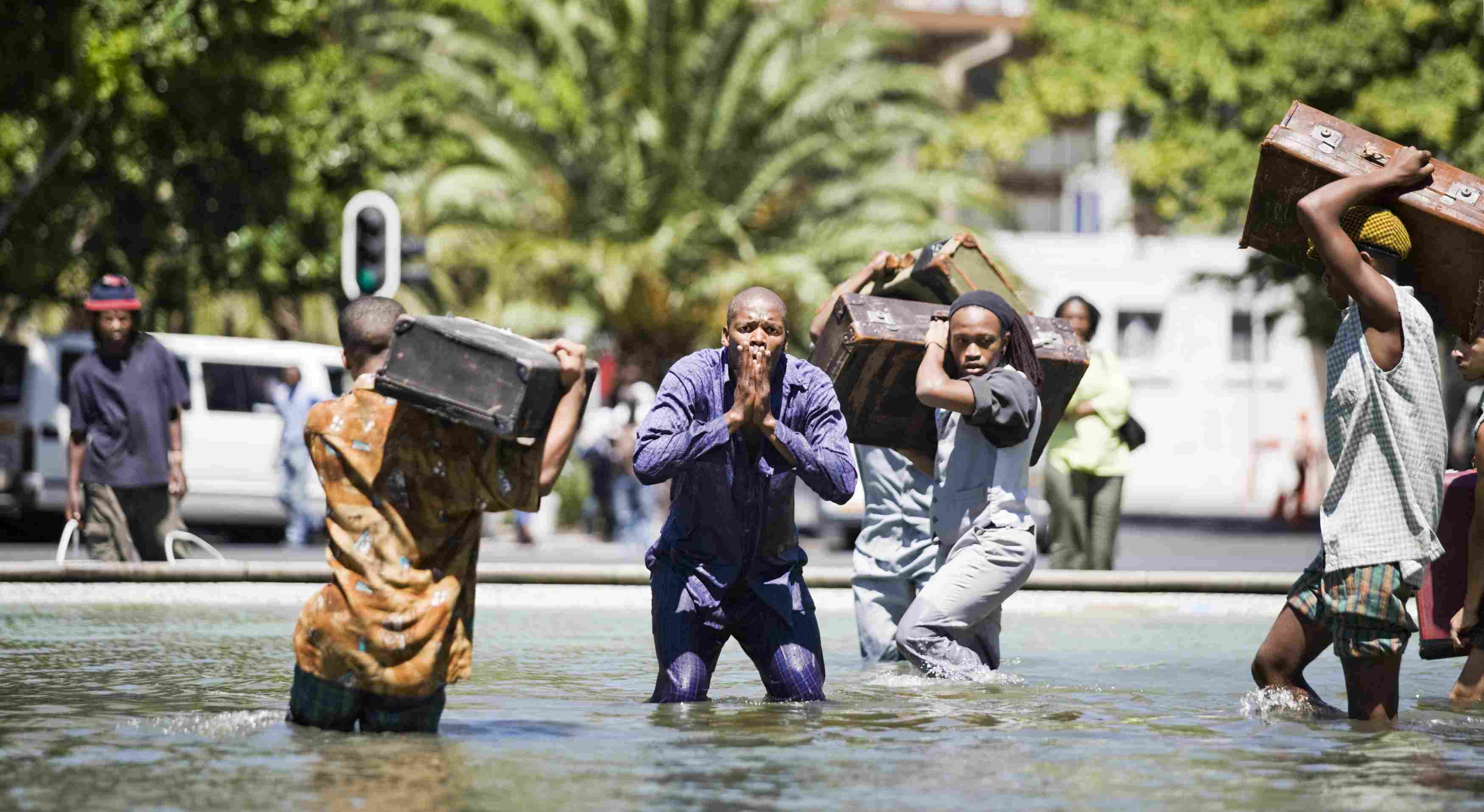
1 – Exile at Infecting the City 2009

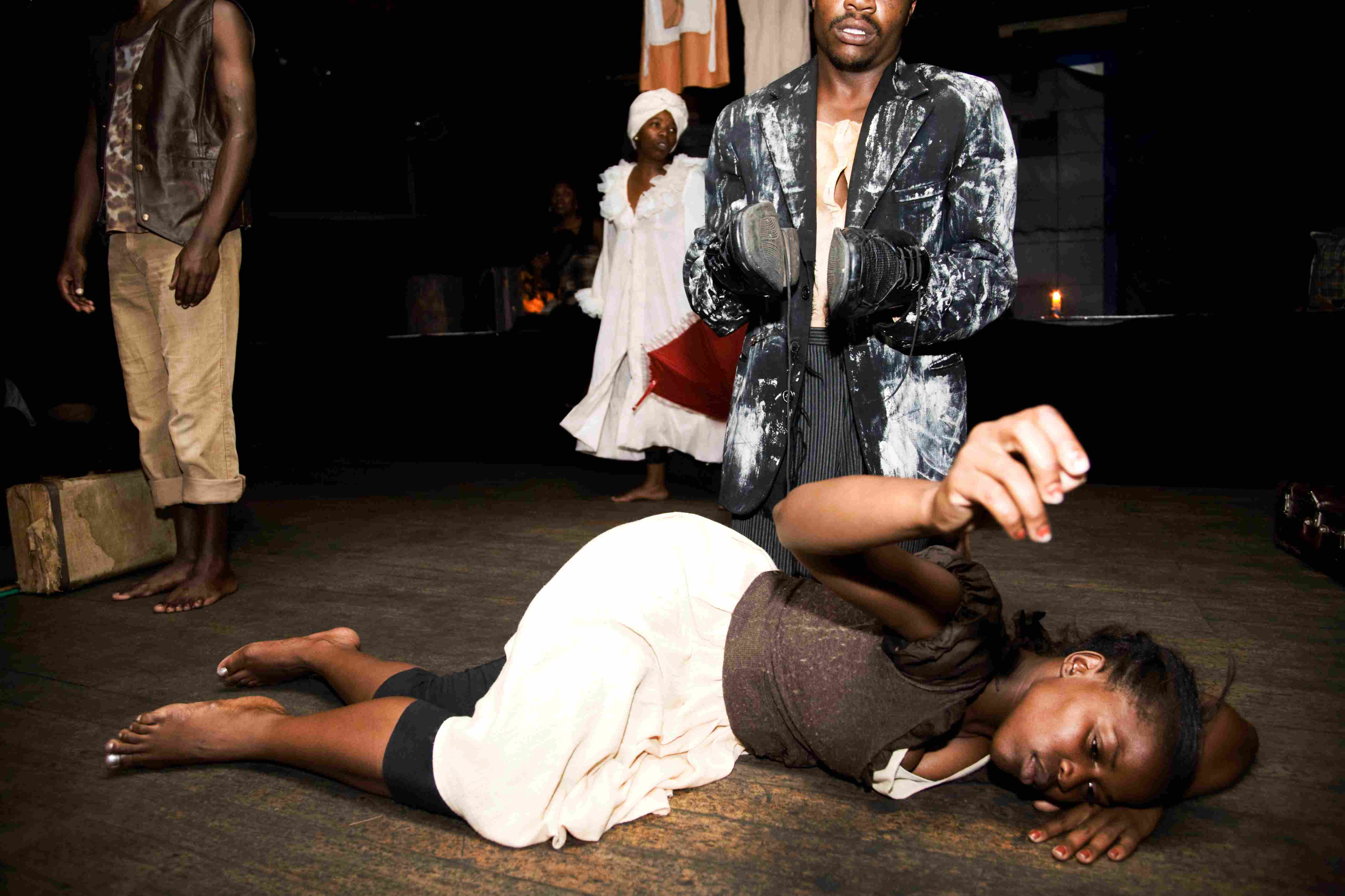
2 – Ingcwaba Lendoda Lise Cankwe Ndlela at Infecting the City 2009

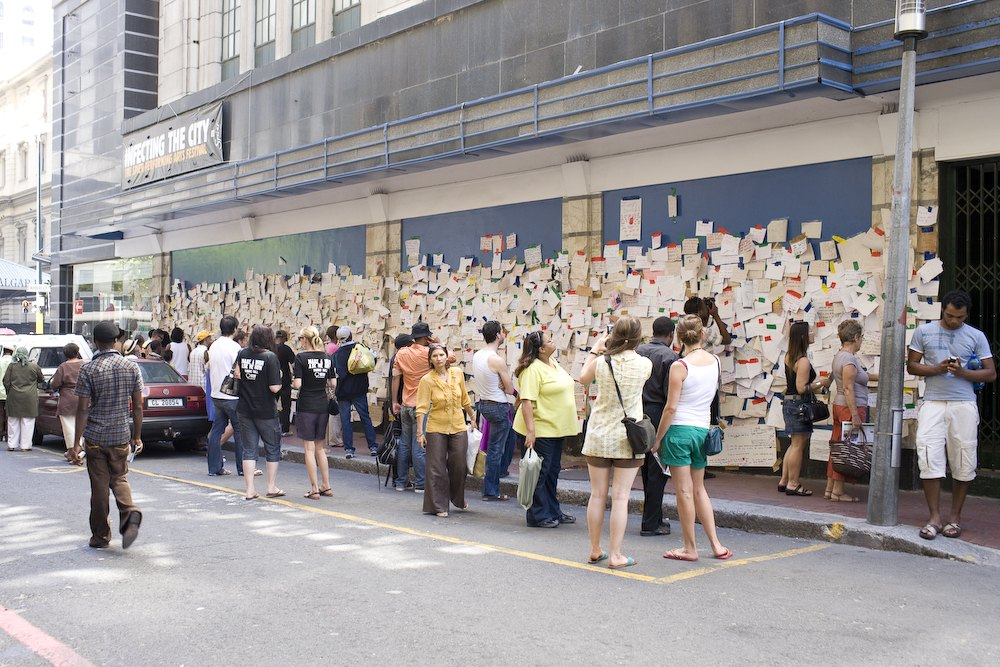
3- Wishing Wall at Infecting the City 2010

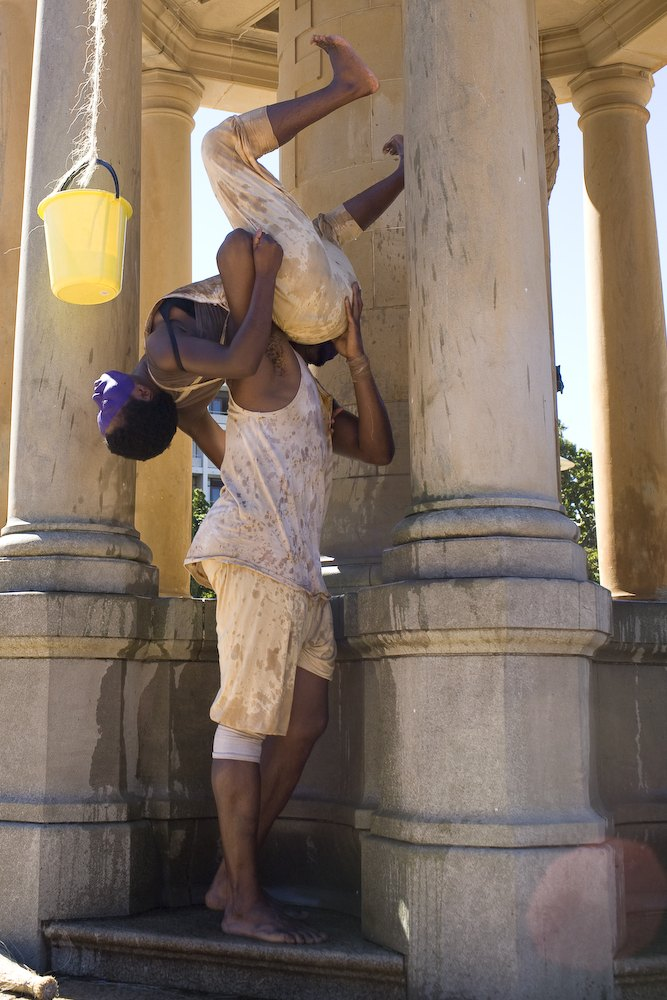
4 – Imperfections at Infecting the City 2010

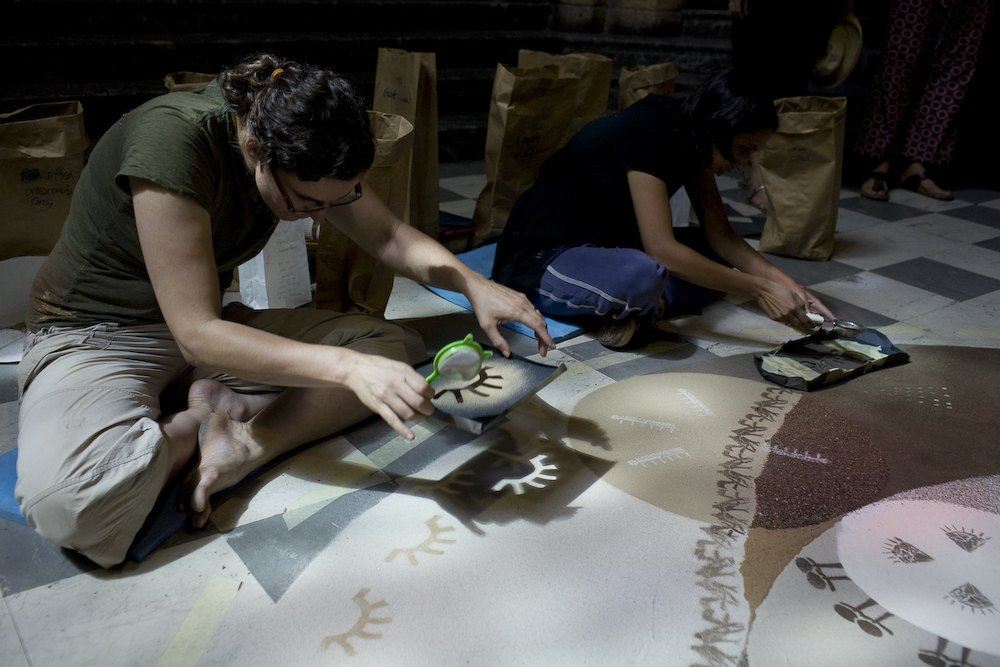
5 – Mandala for Healing at Infecting the City 2010

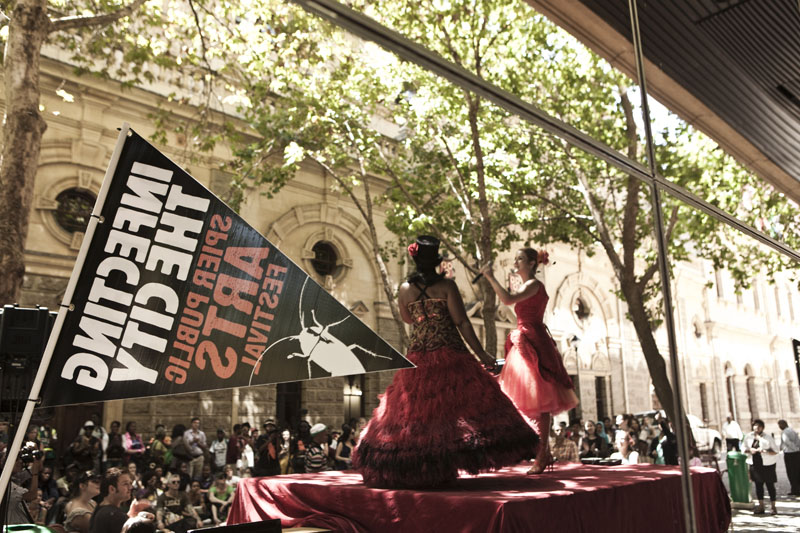
6 – Opera on the Jewel Route at Infecting the City 2011

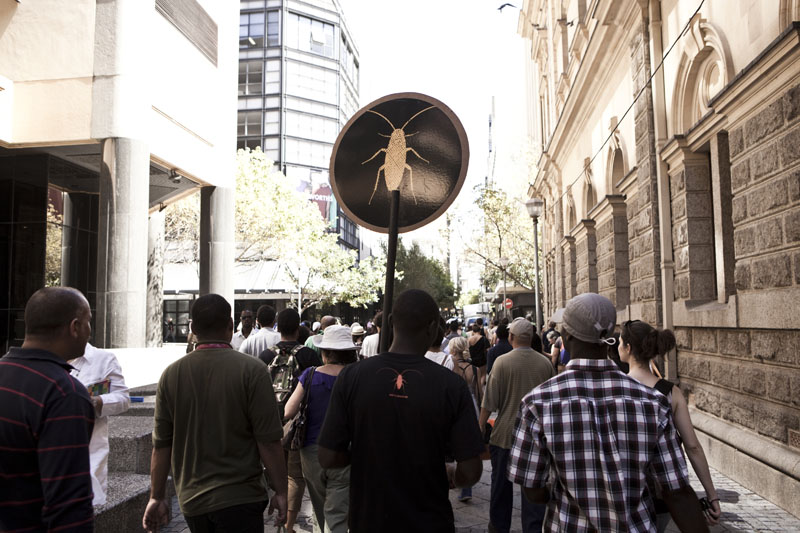
7 – Crowds walking between Jewel Stages at Infecting the City 2011

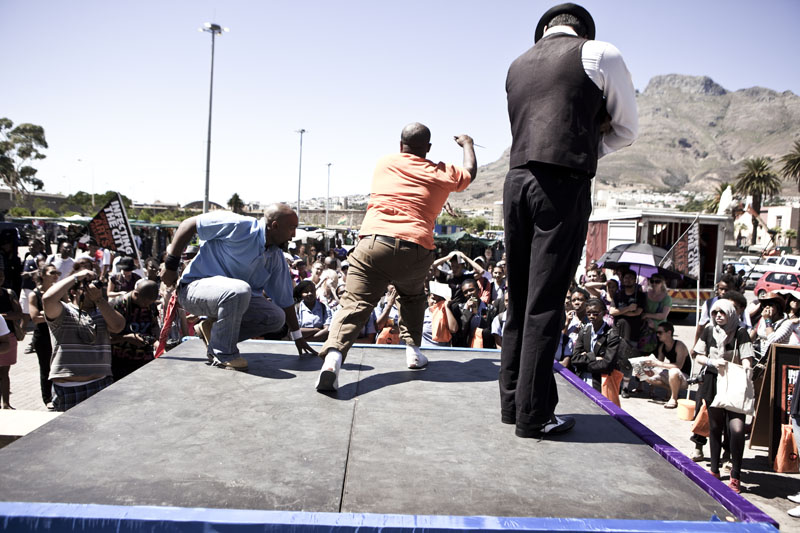
8 – The Piper System performed on Jewel Stages at Infecting the City 2011
