= Douglas Stephen Bax =

South African clergyman, author and activist

Douglas Stephen Bax is a South African clergyman, author and activist. A one-time Moderator of the Presbyterian Church in Southern Africa, he was a prominent anti-Apartheid figure as the principal composer of the Hammanskraal Resolution, a document that called on all South Africans of conscience to become conscientious objectors and refuse to serve in the South African Defence Force prior to the end of Apartheid. The document was adopted as the official response of the South African Council of Churches to the Sharpeville massacre, which had occurred in 1960.

== Early life ==
Bax was born in Benoni, South Africa. His mother's family, the Hattinghs, were a prominent Afrikaner clan; their earliest immigrant ancestor, Hans Heinrich Hattingh, had been a free burgher of the Dutch East India Company in the 1600s and had once owned the historic Spier estate in Stellenbosch. Bax's paternal ancestors, meanwhile, were among the British immigrants that immediately followed the pioneering 1820 Settlers.

== Ordained ministry ==
After being educated at Rhodes University, Bax attended graduate school at Princeton Theological Seminary in the US and Georg August University in Germany. He received a mastership of divinity during this time. Upon his return to South Africa, he was ordained as a minister of the Presbyterian Church of Southern Africa. While working alternately as a preacher and a teacher over the course of a number of years, Bax became active in the church's response to Apartheid, the system of officially enforced racial discrimination that had been in place in South Africa since 1948.

Following the Nationalist government's massacre of Black students in Sharpeville on March 21, 1960, Bax was radicalized, and began to advocate publicly for the people of South Africa – both Black and White – to oppose its policies and obstruct its rule through civil disobedience. At subsequent pan-Christian conferences, Bax and his associate the Dominee Beyers Naudé of the Dutch Reformed Church championed the wider Church's adoption of this stance as official policy.

During a major conference of the South African Council of Churches in Hammanskraal in 1974, Bax and Naudé proposed and seconded respectively a motion advocating conscientious objection in relation to military conscription, which was forcing young South Africans to prop up the Apartheid state through mandatory service regardless of their personal political opinions. Bax had drafted the final document, with help from Naudé and another associate, and it was eventually adopted as the SACC's final resolution at the end of the conference. This would serve as a major Christian contribution to the worldwide campaign to end Apartheid.

Following the eventual election of Nelson Mandela in 1994, Bax continued to serve as a preacher at a large church in Rondebosch. He ultimately retired from its leadership in 2002.

== Personal life ==
Bax married Betty Bax (née Vintcent) in 1971. Their son Michael would grow up to also become active in the Church.
