= D. M. Terblanche =

South African photographer, poet and visual artist

- Born: Dani M. Terblanche; 1998 (age 27–28); Pretoria, South Africa
- Known for: Photography, Poetry, Visual Art
- Notable work: Holyday; I Should Have Burnt More Cars; GRIM

Dani M. Terblanche (born 1998, Pretoria) is a South African photographer, poet and visual artist. A recipient of various accolades for their photography, they are also involved in curation, editing and education.

== Life ==
Terblanche was born in Pretoria, South Africa, in 1998, to a politician mother and an ecological consultant father. They were raised in Potchefstroom in the North West Province, and have two brothers. Their mother studied art history at university in her youth. During their formative years, she was diagnosed with a brain tumor, and while she was convalescing, Terblanche served as her caretaker.

At 23, they survived an attempted hijacking and witnessed a suicide shortly thereafter. Being greatly traumatized by these events, they used photography - which they had been practicing since they were 18 - to process the aftereffects of post-traumatic stress disorder. Following their subsequent completion of the Ph Museum Criticae masterclass sessions under Laura El-Tantawy, the result was Holyday, their award-winning debut project as a professional photographer.

Developed over the course of a 19-month period, Terblanche created its images using an analog camera that they inherited from their grandfather. Both he and other family members featured in the series, which was shot in stark black and white by way of choreographed staging. The series would ultimately win the 2023 Emergentes portfolio grand prize at the Encontros da Imagem Festival in Braga, Portugal.

Seeing photography as a means to explore both personal and political philosophies, Terblanche's more recent work (such as the autobiographical series I Should Have Burnt More Cars and the allegorical series GRIM) has dealt with queer identity (they are agender), autism (they were diagnosed with autism later in life), and transnationalism (they moved to Europe as a young adult and currently work out of Cologne, Germany).

Terblanche is a member of the South African Through The Lens Collective, is largely self-taught, and has had their work shown at both the Saint Laurent Babylone location in Paris, France, under the curation of Anthony Vaccarello, and at the Photo Élysée museum in Lausanne, Switzerland, as part of its epochal Gen Z: Shaping A New Gaze generational cohort. In 2026, they were a featured artist-in-residence at the Ping Pong Arts Residency in Berlin.

In addition to this, Terblanche is also a published poet. Under the moniker "DMT", which they made use of at the time, their prose poem Red appeared in the collected works anthology of The International Human Rights Art Movement (IHRAM) magazine back in 2023. Other literary works have also been published elsewhere.

== Notable awards ==
- 2023: Winner, Emergentes portfolio grand prize, Encontros da Imagem Festival, Portugal.
- 2024: Joint winner, Magnum x Polaroid Real Life Is Not Black And White Open Call, International.
- 2025: Winner, A. J . Page Award, OD Photo Prize, Open Doors Gallery, United Kingdom.
- 2026: Joint winner, New Eyes Award, Roger Ballen Foundation, South Africa.
- 2024: Featured artist, GUP magazine Fresh Eyes International Talent List, the Netherlands.
- 2023: Featured artist, Then There Was Us Ones To Watch List, United Kingdom.
