= Africa Centre =

Not-for-profit cultural organization

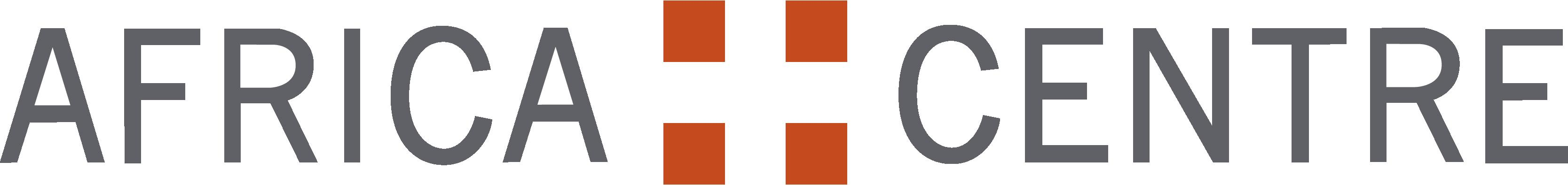
- Formation: 2004; 21 years ago
- Type: NGO
- Legal status: Active
- Purpose: The Africa Centre is an international arts and culture centre and platform for exploring contemporary Pan-African artistic practice and knowledge creation as a catalyst for social change.
- Location: Cape Town, South Africa.
- Official language: English
- Website: www.africacentre.net

The Africa Centre, based in Cape Town, South Africa, is structured as a not-for-profit organisation whose purpose is to provide a platform for Pan-African arts and cultural practice to function as a catalyst for social change. All the projects it conducts, facilitates or supports have some social intention. These projects are supported by a variety of Pan-African artists.

== History ==
The Africa Centre was formally established in 2004 as a Non-Profit Section 21 Corporation by Tanner Methvin, Ralph Freese and Adrian Enthoven in Cape Town, South Africa. This group became the original board of directors. The process began, however, in 2003, with the creation of a land development policy framework, a spatial planning analysis, a feasibility study and a financial model devised to determine possible directions and potential support for the initiative. At this time it was envisioned that the Africa Centre would be housed in an iconic building in South Africa as part of a broader housing development called the South Bank. This development was intended to create a model of sustainable living that combined mixed income, mixed use and was modelled on strict ecological principles. While the building planning was being developed, the board appointed a reference group of internationally recognised visual and performance artists, scholars and curators to determine the philosophical goals of the centre. The members of this group were:

- Adegboyega Adefope – architect,
- Bongiwe Dhlomo-Mautloa – artist and curator,
- Ntone Edjabe – cultural activist,
- Stanley Hermans – artist and curator,
- Faustin Linyekula – choreographer,
- Dominique Malaquais – architectural historian,
- Olu Oguibe – artist, art historian and curator,
- it:Edgar Pieterse – political scientist, and
- AbdouMaliq Simone – sociologist.

Over a period of 18 months, members of the group held several colloquia and workshops in Africa, North America and Europe. These meetings gave rise to a series of position papers focusing on the contextual framework, the potential audiences and the content of the Africa Centre, its architectural form and the programs expected to be developed over the next five years.

What emerged from the work of the reference group and the Board was an intention to create an organisation that could innovate, lead, challenge and transcend its geographical reality; to draw in new and wider audiences to novel experiences that recalibrate how we perceive and locate our society and ourselves. The intention was to provide a space dedicated to the celebration, creation and performance of contemporary African artistic and intellectual expression. What was paramount was the recognition that this voice is the fruit of an ever-evolving conversation, argument and counter-argument. As such the Africa Centre aims to reflect this multiplicity of identity, be proactive as well reactive and always provocative. The Africa Centre strives to be a hothouse for avant-garde ideas, sewing original avenues for exchange and debate; a brain trust with the capacity to project manage, partner with other organisations, sponsor, curate and develop an archive of resources. It wants to be a curious citizen that is committed to social activism and a sustainable future, as well as has the capacity of art and cultural expression to enhance the full range of the human experience.

As the vision developed it became clear that constructing an iconic building to house its projects was both counterproductive and counterintuitive. The Africa Centre's aspiration to work with and in a Pan-African context makes the creation of ideas and content in one city in South Africa impossible. By 2007 the Africa Centre decided that it would no longer seek to build a physical Centre, but instead would develop a decentralised approach to project creation and manifestation throughout Africa and its Diaspora.

== Projects ==
=== Artist in Residency ===
The artist in residency programme was a collaboration with residencies in Australia, Brazil, Ethiopia, Finland, Netherlands, South Africa, Turkey and the United States of America in which the Africa Centre conducts an Africa-wide search for 13 (previously 10) artists each year, across disciplines, to participate in one of the collaborating residencies. The programme has been conceived to support artists from Africa who are provocative, innovative, relevant and highly engaged with both social issues and their art forms.We managed the selection of artists for Rockefeller Centre on Lake Como.

=== Badilisha Poetry ===
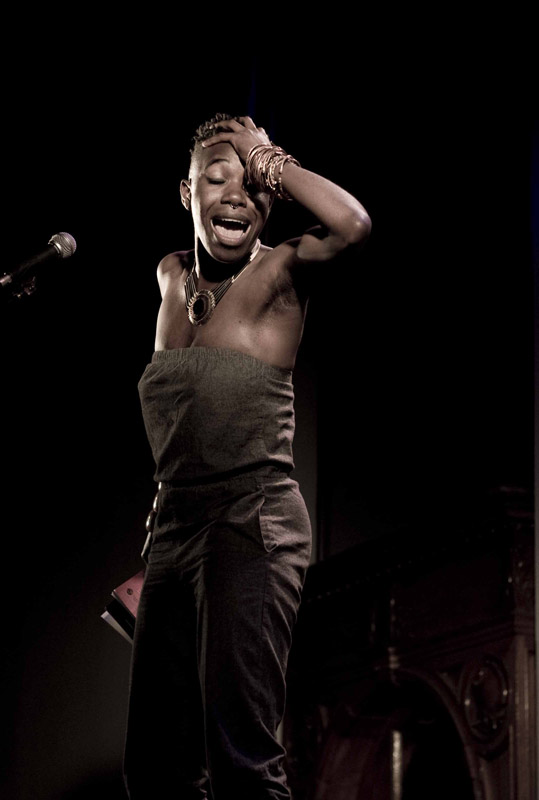
Badilisha Poetry Exchange 2010

Badilisha Poetry X-Change is a platform dedicated to showcasing poetry from Africa and the Diaspora. It is the only podcasting platform in the world dedicated to Pan-African poets. The Badilisha project started with live events in 2006 hosting 1–2 poetry festivals per year. Badilisha Poetry Radio launched on 30 April 2010 and presents new voices and poetic genres through its weekly podcasts of poets from Africa and the Diaspora. Currently there are more than 100 poets featured. "(Its) intention is to platform who and what Africa has to say to itself and the rest of the world."

=== Infecting the City ===
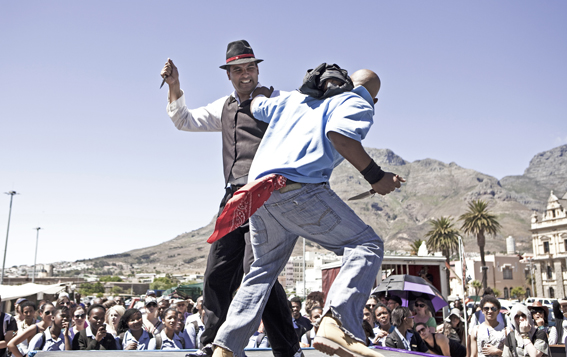
Infecting the City 2011

Infecting the City is a public art festival held annually in the central business district of Cape Town. For a week each year, Infecting the City typically hosts three types of artworks: collaborative works, commissioned works, and audience interventions. These works are collectively presented free to the public in the communal spaces City. Since inception in 2008 it has been experienced by more than 50,000 people, has included 814 local and international artists, and has showcased 81 different productions.It continues under the auspices of Jay Pather of the Institute of Creative Arts at UCT.

=== Pan-African Space Station ===
This project attempts to stake a claim to what African music is and can be. The Pan-African Space Station (PASS) began with an annual 30-day musical intervention through a free-form radio station and in unexpected venues across greater Cape Town. The idea behind the project is to embrace the lineages that shape music-making on and from Africa and to challenge the stereotypes associated with music from this continent. This project is not about connecting with African roots; it ls about exploring African cosmopolitanism in the 21st century through music.Initiated by Neo Muyanga and Toni Edjabe who has evolved the and continues to use the concept.

=== Space for Pan-African Research Creation and Knowledge (SPARCK) ===
SPARCK was a Pan-African initiative of experimental multi-disciplinary residencies, workshops, symposia, exhibitions, publications and performances centred on innovative, ethically driven approaches to urban space. The project involves a number of cities in Africa and beyond: Lubumbashi, Democratic Republic of the Congo; Aba, Nigeria; Touba, Senegal; Karachi, Pakistan; Dubai, UAE, and Guangzhou, China. Functioning as a triennial project, which started in 2008, its three-year thematic modules open ambits for exchange between participants and their audiences. The theme for the project is "Net/Works: Trans-Local Cultures in the Making of African Worlds." This theme is about cities and the art of the deal. Its starting point is an observation: cities in Africa today are crucibles of change, movement, imagination and visions for the future. Despite immense difficulties, not least of which massive infrastructural collapse, urban spaces across the continent are put to use by a wide variety of actors as mechanisms for constructing and renovating economies, cultures and selves. Through complex intersections of migration, commerce and related diasporic practices, they are emerging with increasing strength as platforms for cosmopolitan, highly prolific engagement by Africans with, through and across the globe. SPARCK through the lens of various artistic projects explores, debates, and manifests new ways of understanding this theme.

=== Spier Contemporary ===
The Spier Contemporary has been produced twice, both as an exhibition and as a competition in 2008 and 2010. It was conceived to provide a platform for South African visual and performance artists in every kind of medium, from the more traditional, such as painting and sculpture, to performance art and new media installations, to show their work, uncompromised by the limitations of technology, space and access. Artists in South Africa often work under extremely varied conditions and see the world from radically different perspectives. These differences shape the countries collective identity and unique social and cultural landscape. The Spier Contemporary provided a platform for exploring South Africa's diversity, giving audiences insights into its complexity and thus contributing to South Africa's understanding of difference.

The core objectives of the Spier Contemporary were to: Create a large-scale national exhibition, which genuinely reflects the diversity of the visual and performance arts community living in South Africa; Develop new audiences and markets for artists, which do not normally have access to 30,000+ potential buyers; Access new audiences and develop their respective appreciation of a spectrum of artistic forms; and Provide training and development for visual and performing artists and curators.

The inaugural 2008 exhibition received over 2,500 artists submissions from around the country, exhibited 95 artists in Cape Town and Johannesburg and hosted 25,000 visitors. The 2010 exhibition received over 2,700 artists submissions, exhibited 101 artists, attracted over 20.000 people in Cape Town. The winning artworks selected as part of the competition in 2010 toured four cities in South Africa and attracted 23,000 people.

=== Talking Heads ===
Talking Heads is a multi–layered, knowledge-sharing platform that was conceived to identify, showcase and expose Africa's thought leaders. It profiles the ideas, visions and manifestations of experts, mavericks and extraordinary people living in Africa. The project has multiple dimensions, but the two primary parts are Talking Heads Live and Media. The Live events are designed to provide participants with the opportunity to have an intimate 20-minute conversation (two audience members and one expert per table) with four different experts. Each event includes 40–50 experts ranging from cosmologists, economic forecasters, futurists, to sex worker activists and nuclear physicists, a real Wikipedia evening of Africa's thought leaders. The Media component takes the benefits of the Live events to a broader audience by creating mini-documentaries of compelling participants from the Talking Heads live events. These mini-documentaries are filmed and edited in such a way as to bring to life the information and expertise present from Africa's thought leaders to the broadest pool of people possible.
