= Spier estate =

Historic wine estate in South Africa

Coordinates: 33.973056°S 18.782222°E

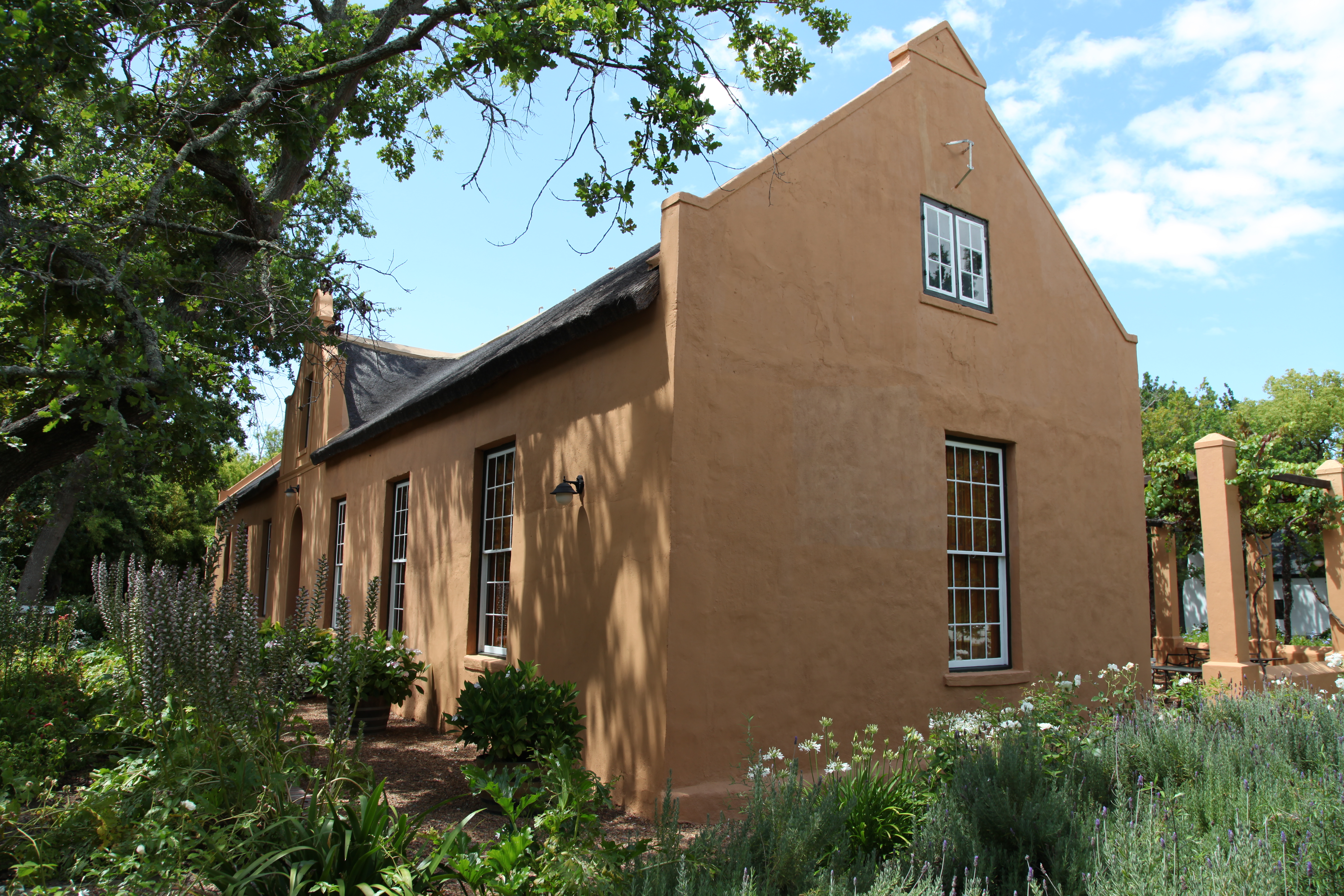
The Manor House at Spier.

Spier estate, also known as Spier Wine Farm, is a historic landed estate founded in 1692 in Stellenbosch, South Africa. One of the country's oldest private residences, it also serves as a working winery, hotel and art gallery.

After a year-long renovation, the hotel and art gallery were re-opened to the public in March, 2025. Sustainability and green architecture were major aspects of their redesign.
