= 1660s in South Africa =

- 1640s 1650s « 1660s » 1670s 1680s
- List of years in South Africa

The following lists events that happened during the 1660s in South Africa.

== Events ==
=== 1660 ===
- The Dutch East India Company imports the first horses into the Cape from Batavia
- Jan Danaert leads a horseback expedition from the Cape settlement to the east and reaches what he names the Olifants River
- Pieter Everaert leads an unsuccessful horseback expedition from the Cape settlement to the north in an attempt to locate the land of the Namaqua

=== 1661 ===
- Pieter Cruythoff is sent out from the Cape settlement to investigate the suitability of the interior for agriculture

=== 1662 ===
- 7 May - Jan van Riebeeck leaves the Cape on promotion to a position on the Council of Justice in Batavia
- 9 May - Zacharias Wagenaer succeeds Van Riebeeck as Commander of the Cape

=== 1663 ===
- 4 March - the Prince Edward Islands were discovered by Barent Barentszoon Lam of the Dutch East India Company ship Maerseveen, and named them Maerseveen (Marion) and Dina (Prince Edward).
- Settler outposts are established in the Hottentots Holland and Saldanha Bay areas

=== 1664 ===
- 26 August - Isbrand Goske arrives at the Cape as Commissioner, and was instructed to select a site for the Castle of Good Hope

=== 1665 ===
- 18 August - The first Dutch Reformed Church congregation is founded at the Cape and J. van Arkel is appointed the first minister

=== 1666 ===
- Settlements in Saldanha Bay and Vishoek are established
- The first Calvinist church built in the Cape
- Construction begins on a stone fort at the Cape (later known as the Castle of Good Hope), with work done by 300 sailors, soldiers, Khoikhoi, women, and slaves; this replaces the previous wooden fort built by Jan van Riebeeck and his men
- 24 October - Cornelis van Quaelberg assumes duty as the Commander of the Cape Colony, after Zacharias Wagenaer resigns from his post.
- Angela van Bengale, an early Cape slave, is freed with her three children.

=== 1667 ===
- The first Malays arrive as slaves

=== 1668 ===
- Hieronimus Cruse is ordered to explore the southeast coast to Mossel Bay, and to return overland.
- 16 June - Cornelis van Quaelberg is succeeded by Jacob Borghorst as Commander, after his dismissal.
- The crew on the Voerman tasked with exploring the Natal coast.
- Angela van Bengale, one of the first freed Cape slaves, is baptized as she fully joins Cape burgher society.
- Adam Tas is born, a future community leader of the Cape Colony.

== Deaths ==
- 1662 - Doman and Autsumao, leaders of the Khoikhoi and interpreters dies
- 1668 - Zacharias Wagenaer, Commander of the Cape, dies

== Bibliography ==
See Years in South Africa for list of further sources
