= Khoikhoi–Dutch Wars =

17th century wars in South Africa

Khoikhoi-Dutch Wars
- Part of the European colonisation of Africa
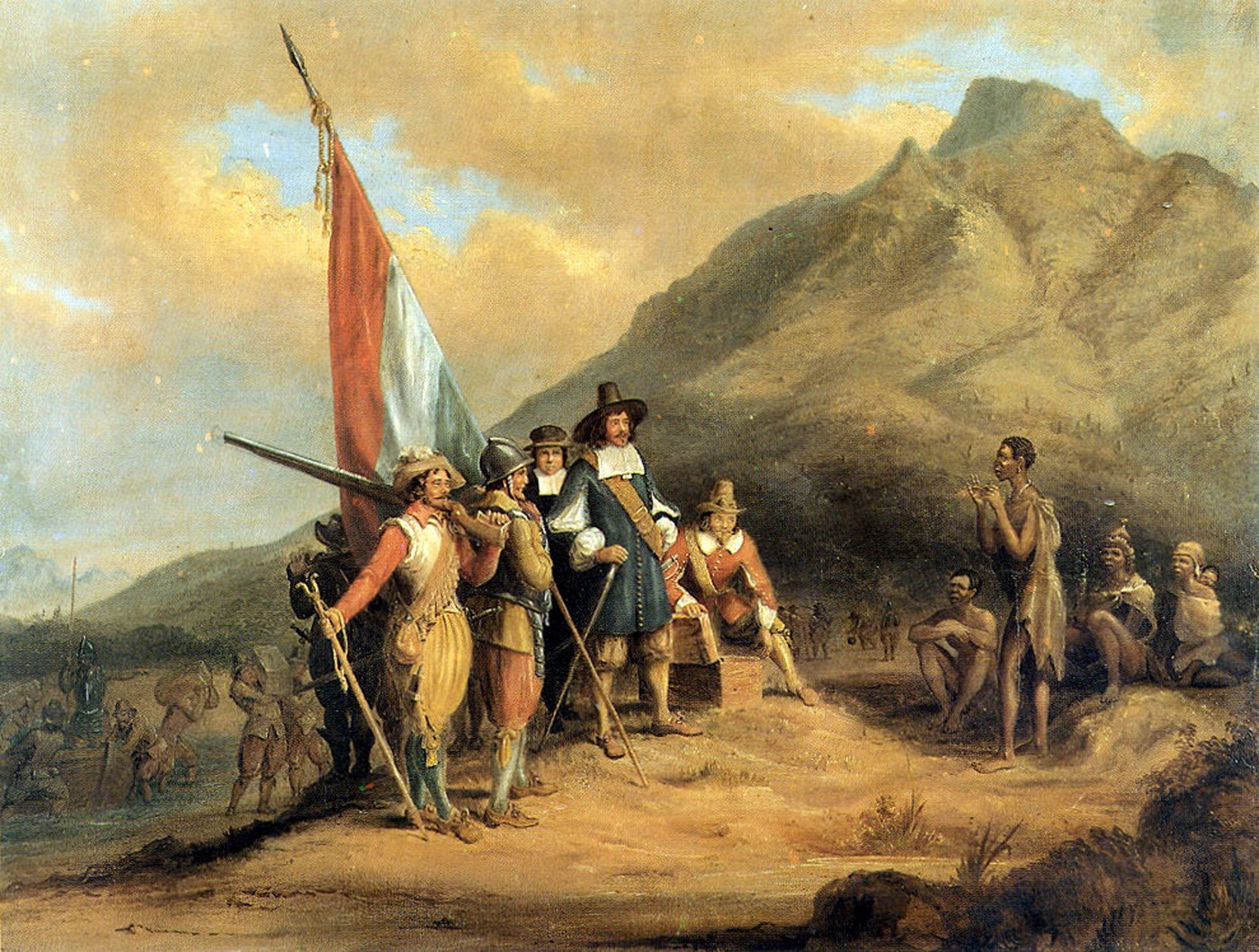
- Jan van Riebeeck arrives in Table Bay in April 1652; Charles Davidson Bell, 1851
Date	1659–1677
Location	Dutch Cape Colony
Result	Dutch victory

Belligerents
Khoekhoe	Dutch East India Company

Commanders and leaders
Nommoa; Gonnema	Jan van Riebeeck; Zacharias Wagenaer; Cornelis van Quaelberg; Jacob Borghorst; Pieter Hackius; Albert van Breugel; IJsbrand Godske; Johan Bax van Herenthals

The Khoikhoi–Dutch Wars (or Khoekhoe–Dutch Wars) refers to a series of armed conflicts that took place in the latter half of the 17th century in what was then known as the Cape of Good Hope, in the area of present-day Cape Town, South Africa, fought primarily between Dutch settlers, who came mostly from the Dutch Republic (today the Netherlands and Belgium) and the local African people, the indigenous Khoikhoi.

Under the Dutch East India Company (VOC), and starting in 1652, colonists (Vrijburghers) – initially and predominantly the VOC's European employees and emancipated servants, but later also including a minority of the VOC's Asian and African employees and emancipated servants and slaves – were permanently settled at the Cape of Good Hope on land which had been seized from the indigenous people, including the Khoikhoi (called Hottentots or Kaffirs by the Dutch), and the Bushmen (also known as the San), collectively referred to as the Khoisan.

Though Europeans had already been trading with Khoikhoi for more than a century, the VOC's colonisation of the Cape in 1652 caused serious disputes to break out over the ownership of land, and especially livestock. Tense competition, which deteriorated into violent attacks and counter-attacks by both sides, resulted in the Khoikhoi–Dutch Wars, which eventually ended with the defeat of the Khoikhoi. The First Khoikhoi–Dutch War lasted from 1659–1660, and the Second Khoikhoi–Dutch War lasted from 1673–1677.

== First Khoikhoi–Dutch War ==
=== Beginning of the War ===
The founding of the Dutch Cape Colony severely disrupted the Khoikhoi inhabiting the Cape Peninsula. Under the command of Jan Van Riebeeck, the VOC occupied the Cape and settled colonists on Khoikhoi land, but without the Khoikhoi's permission and with total disregard for the Khoikhoi's transhumance usage of the land, although it was central to their pastoral economy. In February 1657, the VOC granted nine free burghers land along the Liesbeek River. The Peninsular Khoikhoi objected to the settlement plan on the grounds that they were already using the land, but Van Riebeeck ignored their complaints and continued farming the disputed land. Van Riebeeck also ordered the construction of a line of forts, connected by a series of hedges, today known as Kirstenbosch, with the intention of fortifying the expanding free burgher farms. Over the next two years, the free burghers committed several acts of violence against the Khoikhoi, with the VOC taking a number of Khoikhoi hostage in 1658.

In May 1659, a Khoikhoi man named Nommoa, also known as 'Doman', led a coalition of Khoikhoi leaders in a series of successful cattle raids against the Dutch. Nommoa had been working for the VOC as an interpreter and he had played a major role in facilitating trade between the Dutch and the Khoikhoi. Jan Van Riebeeck had previously sent Nommoa for training in the VOC's colony in Batavia from 1657 to 1658. Whilst in Batavia, where he witnessed the VOC's subjugation of the native people there, as well as native resistance to colonial rule, Nommoa turned against the Dutch. Shortly after his return to Africa, Nommoa led his people to revolt against the VOC's colonial rule in the Cape. Nommoa timed the Khoikhoi's attacks to coincide with the rainy season, knowing that the downpour would render the VOC's matchlock muskets useless, which were incapable of firing while wet.

With express orders by the VOC to not harm the indigenes, Van Riebeeck was reluctant to retaliate against the Khoikhoi, but under pressure from the free burghers, he called a meeting of the VOC's Cape Council of Policy on 19 May 1659 to deliberate on their course of action. The council, consisting of the Colony's administrators and two free burgher representatives, all handpicked by Van Riebeeck, resolved to launch a counterattack, and the free burghers were ordered to seize or shoot the Khoikhoi on sight. This went against the VOC's express orders to not harm the indigenous Khoikhoi, but the council determined that war would be the only way to protect the profitability of the Colony, being the VOC's main objective.

=== Militarisation of the Cape Colony ===
During the council meeting a party of Khoikhoi, led by Nommoa, raided a farm for cattle and killed a man named Simon Janssen in battle. Within an hour of the council's adjournment, news of the Khoikhoi attack reached the Fort De Goede Hoop, causing panic and confusion to set in among the colonists. The Khoikhoi who had been living in and around the Fort immediately fled from the area, fearful of getting caught up in the conflict. Some free burghers fortified their houses in order to better defend their settlements, but others evacuated to the safety of the Fort. In order to augment the Colony's limited armed forces, some free burghers were summoned from their farms and formed into a corps, and soldiers were commandeered from VOC ships as they resupplied at the Cape. In addition, the Council resolved to release a number of slaves from their irons and give them light arms.

In August of 1659, Van Riebeeck and the Council commenced the construction of the redoubts Kijkuijt (The Lookout), Keert de Koe (Stops the cow), and Ruijterwacht, connected by timber fences, in order to further fortify the borders of the VOC's occupation against the threat of cattle raids. Keert de Koe was a 2.4m-tall, stone structure, constructed about a half-hour's walk away from the Fort, at the junction of the Liesbeek River and Salt River at Table Bay. Its location was chosen because of its proximity to a river crossing the Khoikhoi customarily used when approaching Table Bay from the north. The redoubt's main function was to guard this river crossing, for which purposes a gate, or boom, was constructed in the fence along the river. The gate was also visible from the Kijkuijt, which was located close to the beach on the northern bank of the Salt River. Ruijterwacht was erected about 4.8km south of the shore, among the free burghers' farmsteads, and as the name suggests, it served as a mounted infantry station. However, Ruijterwacht wasn't of much use during the war because the company had so few horses at the time. Although horses had been delivered as early as 25 February 1652 (originally entrusted to the care of Autshumao (a.k.a. 'Herry' or 'Harry'), the VOC's stables remained unoccupied until 27 May 1660 — a month after peace was concluded for the First Khoikhoi-Dutch War.

=== Khoisan involvement ===
During the First Khoikhoi-Dutch War, the settlers' cattle were afflicted by a devastatingly virulent sickness which caused death to upwards of four out of five of the cattle in some herds. The settlers ritually prayed to God every Wednesday for relief from the dire situation and for victory. Another Khoisan clan under the leadership of Oedasoa, who were also at war with Doman's clan, approached the settlers and offered an alliance. The Council decided to accept Oedasoa's advice on expedition matters but not to accept any men from his clan for the purpose of conducting military operations since they felt that additional manpower were unnecessary and costly. The arrival of 105 additional European soldiers greatly strengthened the garrison at the Cape. The additional men enabled the settlers to carry out several expeditions, of which most were unsuccessful. Seeking assistance with their expeditions, the Council approached Autshumao, the leader of the Gorinhaicona (a.k.a. 'Strandloper') clan, and he pointed out that Doman's people had already placed men as sentinels on every hill.

=== Skirmishes ===
Skirmishes between the mounted patrols and Doman's people erupted on several occasions where Doman's men were defeated owing to the advantage in weapons on the side of the settlers. During one skirmish, Doman was wounded and his party dispersed from the area. After the conflict ended, the Strandloper clan moved back to the area near the Fort where they had lived before and a time of peace emerged.

=== Peace treaty ===
On 6 April 1660 Doman and his followers arrived at the Fort and concluded a treaty. Both parties agreed that neither would attack each other in future and that Doman's people would only enter the settlement's territory, and remain on the designated paths as pointed out, for the purpose of trade in order to replace the stolen cattle. It was further declared that the free burghers and the Company would retain ownership of the land occupied by them and that the settlers would not treat the natives harshly for what had happened during the war, upon which all parties agreed.

== Second Khoikhoi–Dutch War ==
=== Beginning of the war ===
In 1672 the settlement dispatched explorers in search of Khoisan to trade with since they relied on trade with the Khoisan to obtain livestock for passing ships. The explorers discovered that the Chainouqua and Cochoqua clans were at war with each other. In November 1672 the governor at the Cape sent three hunters to Riebeek's Kasteel to hunt for meat when upon their arrival they were ambushed and robbed by Gonnema's gang. Gonnema, the chief of the Cochoquas, frequently plundered neighbouring Khoisan camps in the area. Gonnema was displeased because of the assistance which the settlement provided in trade with his enemies the Chainouquas. In June 1673 the governor sent another hunting party consisting of nine men with two wagons to hunt large game, the hunters went up into the mountains where they were surrounded and captured by the Cochoquas who detained them for several days and then murdered them at a place called Moordkuil.

=== Cochoquas attack on Saldanha Bay ===
Cochoquas, disguised as traders, arrived at the Company's trading post at Saldanha Bay on 6 July 1673 when suddenly they attacked and murdered four of the soldiers stationed there. The Chochoquas then plundered the outpost. Only one soldier managed to escape.

=== Settlement's response ===
After receiving news of these attacks the counsel resolved to send soldiers in search of the Cochoquas. Ensign Hieronymus Cruse assembled and led 36 freeburghers and 36 Company soldiers to the area of Twenty Four Rivers. Reinforcements in the form of eighteen horsemen under leadership of freeburgher officer Elbert Diemer were dispatched a few days later to assist Hieronymus Cruse in his mission. The settlements combined forces marched across the area of Twenty Four Rivers when their scouts discovered a Cochoqua kraal among the mountains on 18 July. By the time the forces arrived at the kraal, it had been abandoned. They found property belonging to the murdered settlers inside the abandoned huts. The following day the horsemen followed the fugitives resulting in the Chochoquas fleeing into the mountains and leaving their cattle behind. Hieronymus Cruse then took possession of the cattle and ordered his forces to return to the fort. When the forces stopped to set up camp for the night the Cochoquas mobilised an attack in an attempt to recover the cattle, during the skirmish one burgher was wounded and two horses killed while about twelve Cochoquas were fatally wounded. Gonnema failed to recover the livestock and the expedition forces reached the fort again on 25 July 1673 with eight hundred head of horned cattle and nine hundred sheep.

=== Dutch–Chainouqua Alliance ===
The Chainouquas, who were already at war with the Cochoquas, now allied with the settlers. On 20 August the Chainouquas with more than a hundred of their people arrived at the fort. They had captured four of Gonnema's followers and delivered them to the governor to be tried by a court. They were found guilty of participation in the murder of the burghers and were sentenced to death at the hands of the Chainouquas.

The war had been suspended for some months, owing to a fatal disease which had broken out among the Khoisan people. On 24 March 1674 the Chainouquas reported that their spies had located Gonnema's camp at the Little Berg River at Tulbagh Kloof whereafter it was resolved to send combined forces to that location. There were fifty freeburghers under command of Wouter Moster, four hundred Chainouquas under command of captains Klaas, Koopman, Schaecher, and Kuiper, and fifty soldiers under Ensign Cruse, who was also commandant-general of the expedition. The Cochoquas anticipated an attack and fled, leaving their possessions and livestock behind. The army seized eight hundred head of horned cattle and four thousand sheep. The spoils were divided among the soldiers and the Company.

=== 1675 Cochoqua offensive ===
In November 1675 Gonnema led a surprise attack at Tigerberg where the Chainouquas kept their cattle during which several of the herders were killed and a large portion of their cattle were taken. During the skirmish fifteen Cochoquas were killed. By the time reinforcements from the settlement arrived Gonnema had already escaped into the mountains.

=== 1676 Dutch–Chainouqua offensive ===
In 1676 the council dispatched a military expedition under the command of Lieutenant Cruse, in search of the Cochoquas, consisting of fifty foot-soldiers, twenty-three horsemen, fifty burghers and a large band of Chainouquas. They were unable to track down the Cochoquas location. It was then decided to send a spy named Jacob to locate Gonnema, the spy returned with news that the Cochoquas were at war with other Khoisan clans named the Namaquas and the Chariguriquas. Another force was dispatched under guidance of the spy Jacob to Saldanha Bay, where they found and killed several of Gonnema's followers. They seized one hundred and sixty-five head of horned cattle and thirty sheep which was taken by the Chainouquas as spoils of war.

=== 1677 peace treaty ===
On 8 June 1677 Cochoqua messengers arrived at the Castle of Good Hope to initiate peace negotiations of which the council were in favour. On 24 June a delegation of high ranking Cochoquas arrived at the Castle with nine head of cattle to negotiate for peace. The following terms were agreed upon: trade relations between the Cochoqua and the Dutch East India Company would be restored and the Cochoquas would deliver as tribute thirty head of cattle yearly to the return fleet of the Company. Furthermore, the Cochoquas would instruct their people to refrain from stealing livestock from the settlers and their allies and severely punish those who committed such a crime. The Cochoquas vowed not to wage war against any of the Company's allies.

== Conclusion ==
Some modern scholars have observed that superior war-making ability was not the only means whereby the Dutch forced the Khoikhoi to submit and concluded that, in addition to having superior technology, European settlers also used bureaucratic support from the Dutch East India Company to occupy better watered and more productive lands in the interior, whereas Khoikhoi pastoralists were denied access to these lands. The settlers could defend these lands from Khoikhoi by firearms:

In a slow, non-catastrophic process the Khoikhoi were gradually squeezed out of the lands they had once occupied as European settlers alienated the springs and permanent water courses. The survivors of this process often became clients of European settlers and applied their skills in animal husbandry to the invaders' livestock instead of their own.

The disappearance of these people from the land can be attributed to the conflicts of the Khoikhoi Dutch Wars and the political and legal aftermath in the resulting areas. The hunter-gatherer lifestyle associated with the Khoisan faced new barriers from legal changes around activities necessary to maintain a hunter gatherer society. Additional contributions to the disintegration of the Khoisan ethnicity revolve around the loose structure of the Khoisan society. The relative lack of a strong Khoisan social structure created an environment in which Khoisan people were ready to acculturate to the Dutch and Bantu speaking intruders given the collapse of the existing Khoisan social structure or disruption of the existing lands being used for survival by the Khoisan. Khoisan people were spread all throughout the southern portion of Africa as seen in Map 1. The portions of land seen in Map 1 were commonly shared with the Bantu people, but the alignment of the Bantu with Dutch goals contributed to the downfall of Khoisan political influence in Southern Africa. The loss of Khoisan political influence has also led to the decline in the commonality of the Khoisan language. Khoisan pottery was one of the few expressions of Khoisan language and most remnants of this style of pottery have been wiped out. The final conclusion of the Khoikhoi-Dutch wars is that the Khoisan people along with their culture was completely wiped out in a complex struggle balancing potential prosperity with cultural identity. The complexity of the disappearance of the Khoisan from influence in Southern Africa is often seen as the Khoisan trading away their influence for livestock. The truth is the resistance of the Khoisan was a response and reaction to the disposition of the Boers. The downfall of the Khoisan came at the hands of violence that is often overlooked when considering the ethnic identities that vanished from the African continent in the 17th and 18th centuries.

== See also ==
- Cape Colony
- Military history of South Africa
