= 1672 in South Africa =

- Decades
- See also: List of years in South Africa

The following lists events that happened during 1672 in South Africa.

== Incumbents ==
- Acting Commander - Albert van Breughel
- Commander of the Cape of Good Hope - Isbrand Goske

== Events ==
- The VOC attempts to transfer land previously seized from the Khoikhoi.
- Sugar cane is introduced to South Africa.
- The first Cape brandy is produced, and is then used as a currency in trade with the Khoikhoi.
- 13 Dutch East India officials are sent to Hottentots Holland to boost its wheat production.
- War breaks out between the United Provinces of the Netherlands on one side, and both Britain and France on the other side.
- The VOC assumes itself as the rightful owner of the Cape district, including Table Bay, Hout Bay, and Saldanha Bay.
- The Duijnhoop redoubt is demolished.
