= 1670s in South Africa =

- 1650s 1660s « 1670s » 1680s 1690s
- List of years in South Africa

The following lists events that happened during the 1670s in South Africa.

== Events ==
=== 1670 ===
- 2 June - Jacob Borghorst, after his formal resignation, is succeeded by Pieter Hackius as Commander of the Cape Colony.
- According to word-of-mouth the Zulu royal line is founded by Zulu, son of Malandela.
- The French attack Saldanha Bay, and in doing so expose the Dutch settlement's vulnerability.
- The VOC commits to establishing a permanent settlement at the Cape, as growing British and French influence in the Indian Ocean begins to become a concern.
- Commissioner Mattheus van der Broeck arrives at the Cape settlement with a fleet of 15 ships.
- The first public works tender is awarded to free burgher Wouter Mostert, as free burghers are now allowed to tender for construction materials.
- Free burghers are banned from trading livestock with the Khoisan, but are granted licenses to hunt large game.
- VOC directors order the Cape Government to stop farming and source their food from burgher farmers via tenders.

=== 1671 ===
- Land is purchased from the Khoikhoi and the Cape Colony started
- 1 December- After the death of Pieter Hackius, Governor of the Cape, a political council is appointed to run the colony with Coenraad van Breitenbach as chairman

=== 1672 ===
- Sugar cane is introduced
- Production of Brandy is started
- 23 March - Albert van Breugel is appointed acting Governor of the Cape
- 2 October - IJsbrand Godske is appointed Governor of the Cape

=== 1673 ===
- When negotiations for trade of livestock fails, the VOC sends Hieronimus Cruse to attack the Cochoqua on horseback, which starts the Second Dutch-Khoikhoi War. The Dutch end up seizing a number of livestock accounting to 1800.
- 13 Dutch explorers find fertile grazing land suitable for wheat production north-east of the Hottentots-Holland Mountains, home to the Chainoqua, Hessequa, Cochoqua, and Gouriqua Khoi-Khoi chiefdoms.
- A Dutch hunting party of nine men with two wagons ventured into the mountains for large game. They were ambushed and captured by the Cochoqua, detained for several days, and subsequently killed at a location known as Moordkuil.
- The Khoikhoi have large livestock herds and begin to trade with the Dutch, but unfair Dutch terms lead to conflict and livestock raiding.
- The Dutch capture an English slaver with 184 Malagasy slaves, uncovering the Boina Bay slave trade.
- The VOC begins to establish a regular slave-trade route from the Cape to Boina Bay.
- De Post Huys is built, the oldest existing house in South Africa.

=== 1676 ===
- 2 January - Johan Bax van Herenthals is appointed Governor of the Cape
- 18 February - Two young lions are dispatched from Cape Town to Ceylon as a gift to the king of Kandy
- A military expedition is dispatched under the command of Lieutenant Cruse, in search of the Cochoquas. It consists of fifty foot-soldiers, twenty-three horsemen, fifty burghers and a large band of Chainouquas
- Starting the Third Dutch-Khoikhoi War, the VOC launches a second attack on the Chocoqua. Nearly 5,000 livestock and weapons are seized.
- Oloff Bergh, a future appointee of the High Court of Justice, arrives at the Cape coming from Sweden.

=== 1677 ===
- Governor Bax sends captain Cornelis Thomas Wobma along the west coast to determine the boundary between the Khoi-Khoi and the Kaffirs.
- The Third Khoikhoi-Dutch War ends. Governor Bax secures the Chocoqua’s submission, and demands an annual tribute of thirty cattle.
- Jan van Riebeeck dies aged 57 in Batavia.
- The first person in the Uys family to arrive at the Cape is Daentie Rycken, the mother of the family's progenitor. She is accompanied by Jan Hendriksz de Lange, her second spouse.

=== 1678 ===
- The settlement of Hottentots-Holland is established
- 29 June Hendrik Crudop is appointed acting Governor of the Cape

=== 1679 ===
- 26 April The building of the Castle of Good Hope is completed
- 14 October Simon van der Stel is appointed Commander of the Cape
- 6 November - The town of Stellenbosch is founded on the banks of the Eerste River.
- A Slave Lodge is made for VOC slaves. It is the second oldest building in South Africa.
- Simon van der Stel is mandated by the VOC to expand the Dutch colonial rule.
- Conditions in the Slave Lodge are rated low. The structure is permanently moist, has poor air circulation, and a persistent odor due to its leaking roofs, lack of windows, and barred slats in the walls.

== Deaths ==
- 30 November 1671 - Pieter Hackius dies
- 18 January 1677 - Jan van Riebeeck dies at Batavia on Java
- 29 June 1678 - Johan Bax van Herenthals dies
