= 1650s in South Africa =

- 1630s 1640s « 1650s » 1660s 1670s
- List of years in South Africa

The 1650s in South Africa saw the beginning of European settlement, marked by the introduction of crops from Europe and the New World and culminating in war with the Khoikhoi in 1659.

== Jan van Riebeeck ==
Jan van Riebeeck arrives in Table Bay aboard the Drommedaris on 6 April 1652. He selects a site for a fortification, and establishes a VOC refreshment station at the Cape to supply passing ships.

== Milestones ==
Bernert Willemsz Wijlant, the first European baby, was born at the Cape on 6 June 1652. In 1654, Batavian convicts and political opponents were banished to the Cape bringing Islam to South Africa. Hout Bay, a sheltered cove just south of the Cape settlement is proposed as a settlement for Dutch families on 6 October 1654. Van Riebeeck sent Jan Wintervogel, a Dutch ensign, to scout the interior in 1655. Wintervogel went as far as Saldanha Bay. Van Riebeeck sent Willem Muller, a Dutch corporal, with the Khoikhoi interpreter, Autsumao, to explore the Hottentots Holland region. Maize and Grape vines were planted in the Cape that same year. In 1657, Abraham Gabbema was sent to scout the interior and explored as far as the Berg River and Paarl regions. Doman, the leader of the Goringhaiqua Khoikhoi, was sent to Batavia to be trained as an interpreter. Nine Dutch East India Company servants were freed to become free burghers (free citizens) on 21 February. They settled along the Liesbeeck River (now Rondebosch area). The first wine was pressed from Cape grapes on 2 February 1659. Jan van Riebeeck established the Burgher Militia on 1 May 1659. A few days later on 19 May, the Khoikhoi protested against white encroachment, leading to the first Khoikhoi-Dutch War.

The first VOC horses are imported from Java.

== Slavery ==
The Dutch East India Company gave van Riebeeck authority to bring slaves to South Africa in 1654. The Roode Vos ship sailed to Mauritius and Anongil Bay, Madagascar in search of slaves, but brought back none. In 1658, the Amersfoort ship stole 250 slaves from a Portuguese slave trading trafficking slaves from Angola to Brazil. The ship arrived in South Africa on 28 March with 170 slaves. 80 died during the trip. Later that year, the Hassalt ship brought 228 out of an initial 271 slaves from the Gulf of Guinea to South Africa on 6 May. 43 died at sea. After these two shipments, the Dutch East and West companies agreed to stop enslaving natives from lands controlled by the other company. Slave traffickers brought 63,000 slaves to South Africa between 1658 and 1808, when the British abolished the slave trade.

Catharina Anthonis, became the first slave to be freed to marry Jan Woutersz, a Dutch settler, in 1656. In 1658 a Portuguese slaver was captured and 174 slaves were taken. About 80 were shipped to Batavia.

== See also ==
- Slavery in Angola
