= 1600s in South Africa =

- 15th 16th century « 1600s » 1610s 1620s
- List of years in South Africa

The following lists events that happened during the 1600s in South Africa.

== Events ==
- 1594 - 1601 - James Lancaster, an English navigator, explores the southern African coast and establishes trade relationships with the Khoikhoi
- Europeans being settling in South Africa, increasing colonization and trade with the Khoikhoi. Representatives of the British East India Company began calling sporadically at the Cape in search of provisions.
- Nguni and Sotho groups begin to split into modern identities such as Zulu, Ndebele, Tswana, and Xhosa.
- 1601 - Joris van Spilbergen anchors in Table Bay.
- 20 March 1602 - The Vereenigde Landsche Ge-Oktroyeerde Oost-Indische Compagnie (VOC) trading company, better known as the Dutch East India Company, receives a charter from the States General, which entails a trading monopoly and the right to acquire and govern Dutch possessions in the Orient for a period of 21 years.
- 1608 - The Portuguese ship, Santo Esperitu, is believed to have been shipwrecked off the eastern coast of South Africa

== Bibliography ==
See Years in South Africa for further sources.
