= Pieter Hackius =

Dutch colonial governor

5th Commander of the Cape
- In office 25 March 1670 – 30 November 1671
- Preceded by: Jacob Borghorst
- Succeeded by: Albert van Breugel (acting)

Personal details
- Died: 30 November 1671 Cape Town
- Spouse: Alida Paets

Pieter Hackius (died 30 November 1671) was the fifth commander of the Cape of Good Hope before it became the Dutch Cape Colony in 1691. Hackius succeeded Jacob Borghorst as commander on 25 March 1670 and was appointed to a position similar to governor on 2 June 1670.

== Career ==
Hackius became secretary of the college of aldermen in Batavia in 1643 and bailiff in 1651. In the same year he also served as an elder of the Reformed Church. In 1656 he returned to the Netherlands and thirteen years later, in 1669, he was appointed head of the refreshment station at the Cape.

On 7 December 1669 he left Texel and arrived in Table Bay the following March. On 25 March 1670, he took over control from his ailing predecessor, Jacob Borghorst, although he too was practically an invalid. When Isbrand Goske visited the Cape in February 1671, he was very critical of Hackius as many assignments had not been carried out. Hackius served as commander for only a year and eight months and his health deteriorated rapidly, and the secundes, Hendrik Crudop and Cornelis de Cretzer had to handle the administration. During his reign, efforts were made to encourage immigration from Holland, but nothing of importance really happened.

== Personal ==
Hackius married Alida Paets and they had 5 children. He died in the Fort de Goede Hoop after a lengthy illness, and was the first head of the Cape Colony to die in the Cape and was buried there.

== See also ==
- 1670s in South Africa
