= Battle of Masulipatnam =

- Part of the Third Anglo-Dutch War
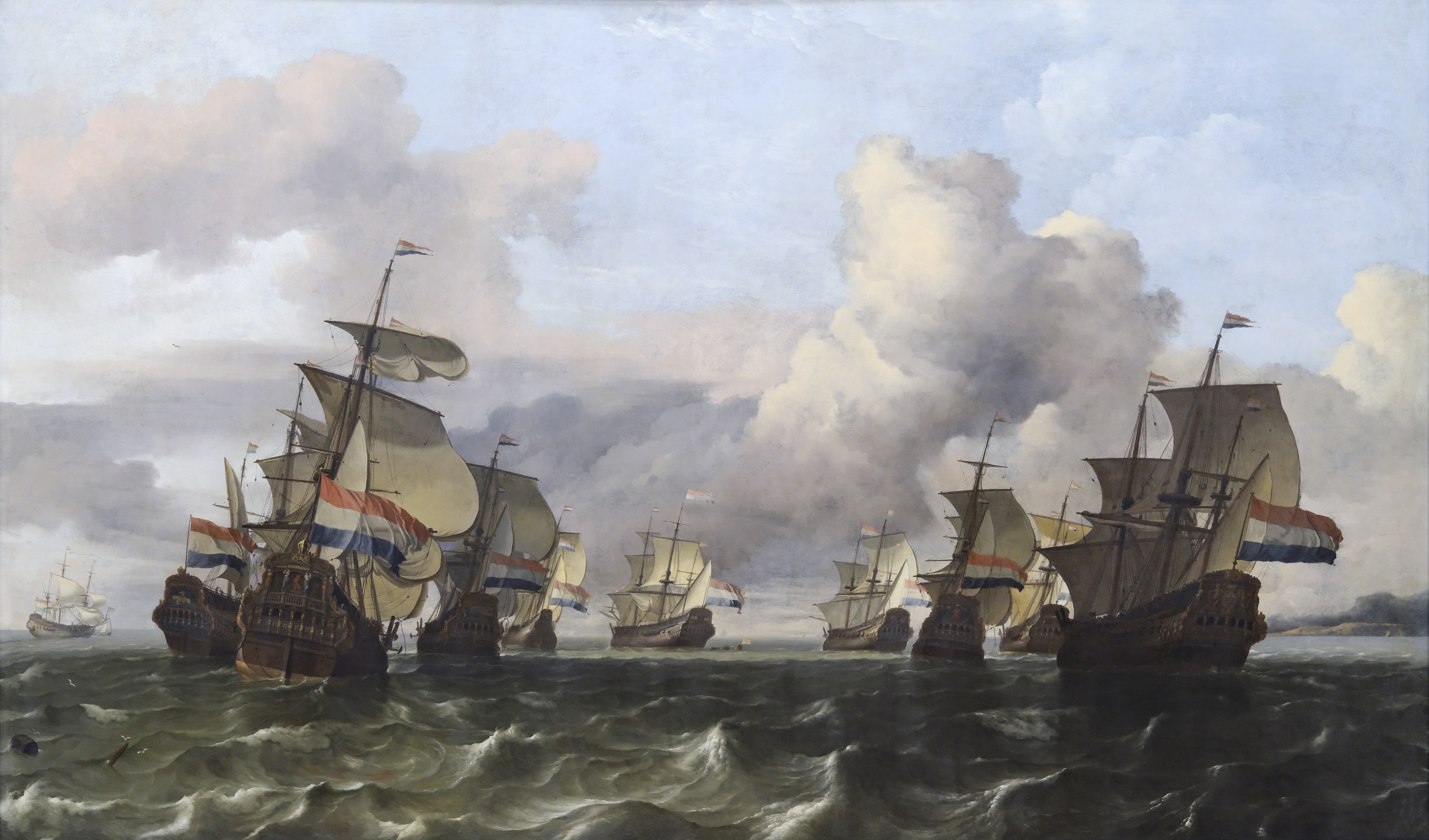
- Returning fleet of the Dutch East India Company (1675), by Ludolf Bakhuysen
Date	1 September 1673 (N.S.); 22 August 1673 (O.S.) (Note: The English still used the Julian calendar at this time.)
Location	Machilipatnam, India
Result	Dutch victory

Belligerents
Dutch East India Company	East India Company

Commanders and leaders
(Dutch East India Company) Cornelis van Quaelberg	William Basse

Strength
13 warships	10 warships

Casualties and losses
Light	3 ships captured 360 killed, wounded or taken prisoner

The Battle of Masulipatnam took place between the Dutch East India Company (VOC) and English East India Company (EIC) during the Third Anglo-Dutch War off Machilipatnam. During the siege of São Tomé 13 Dutch ships clashed with 10 English ships in a battle which ended in a Dutch victory.

== Prelude ==
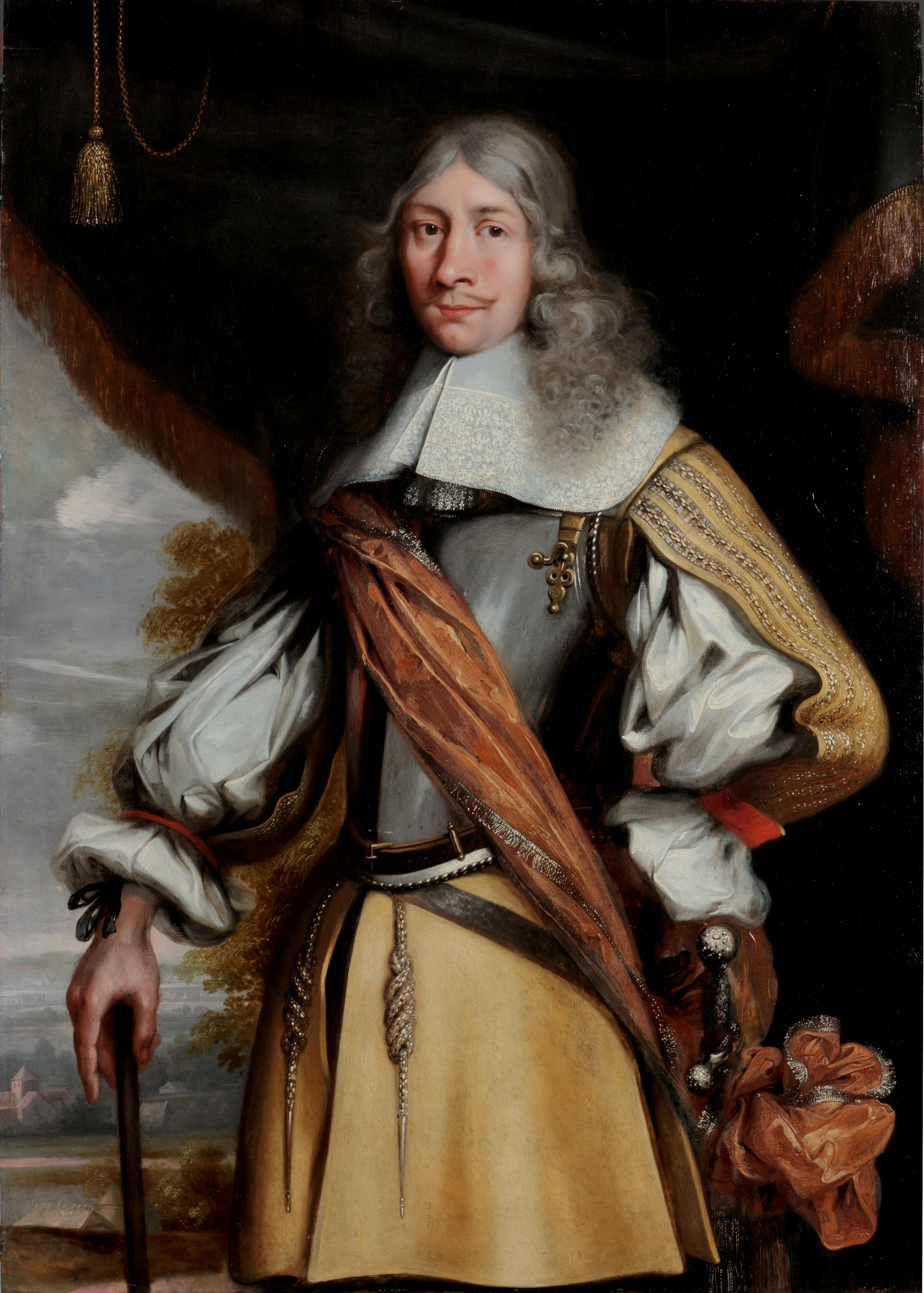
Rijcklof van Goens, commander of the Dutch forces in Asia.

In 1671, even before the outbreak of Franco-Dutch War, the French navy had placed a powerful squadron under the command of Admiral de la Haye at the disposal of the French East India Company. In full knowledge that war with the Dutch Republic would be declared next year, it was deemed opportune to send a powerful fleet to Asia to be in a position to strike when news was received that hostilities had commenced. La Haye had been ordered to seek a firm foothold in Asia to fortify and defend, sending all but two of his ships home. It was with this object in mind that the French captured Trincomalee, the crucial strategic bay on Ceylon’s east coast, in March 1672 and São Tomé from the Dutch in July 1672.

But taking São Tomé was a mistake. It had formerly been a Portuguese town and the Portuguese government still hoped to see it returned to them. Situated close to Madras, the French capture of the town also angered their English allies since it placed a powerful commercial rival right on the doorstep of what was the most important EIC settlement in India. Finally, by conquering the city, the French gained the enmity of the Abul Hasan Qutb Shah, the sultan of Golconda, the sovereign of the city. Golconda raised an army and set about to besiege the town from the summer of 1672 onwards. This first siege was in fact broken by the French, but by June 1673, the VOC, having secured its position in Southeast Asia by defeating the French garrison left behind in Trincomalee, joined forces with the Qutb Shahi and the town was besieged again, on land by the forces of Golconda, and on the sea side by the fleet of the VOC under Rijcklof van Goens.

== The battle ==
During the siege an English fleet appeared on the Coromandel coast, consisting of ten East Indiamen of the English East India Company under William Basse. It would have been possible for this fleet to join forces with the remaining part of the French navy, to relieve São Tomé together and drive the Dutch out of the area. But the English made no attempt to do so and chose to remain on their own. Van Goens, who does not seem to have heard of the arrival of this naval force, had sent a fleet of thirteen Dutch East India Company ships to Masulipatnam, an important office, north of São Tomé on the coast of Coromandel, to protect it against the attacks of the French admiral de la Haye, who seemed to be aiming for that post.

Cornelis van Quaelberg to whom the command of this fleet was entrusted, met the English fleet on 1 September 1673 (N.S., 22 August O.S.), five or six miles from Masulipatnam. Soon the battle began, which was fought vigorously on both sides. After three or four hours of fighting the Dutch finally emerged victorious, taking the ship of the English Vice-Admiral of 40 guns, that of the Rear-Admiral of 34 guns, and a third of 36 guns. The others were chased away, and soon left the Indian seas altogether.

The English Captain Basse, who acted as admiral of the EIC squadron gives a detailed account of the battle in the log of his ship London. (Note: Note that it was an EIC ship, so it was not "HMS London".) He writes that the battle started at 10 AM. (Note: The Dutch fleet was first seen at 6 AM to windward, so they had the weather gage, and Basse ordered his ships to form line of battle at 8 AM and started beating to windward to close the distance.) His Van was led by Captain Earwin, who bore away after about two hours in the fight, followed by the second ship under Captain Cruft, because he had been holed under the waterline. Both ships did not reengage, but what Cruft's excuse was Basse did not know. Captain Westlock did not engage at all that day. He was second behind the ship of Captain Hides, who acted as Vice-Admiral, and kept to leeward of the line, so was in relative safety. Hides himself got the worst of it, as his ship was disabled around 5.30 PM and then surrounded by three Dutch ships and boarded by two of them, one on either side. His ship was taken, as was the ship of Captain Earning (Rear-admiral, so leading the rear), and the Antelope of captain Goldsborough.

Basse had his rigging shot away, as the Dutch fired chains and several small cannonballs per shot (foreshadowing the Shrapnel shell), maximizing the effect of their broadsides. His main mast was holed in three places. To make matters worse there was a gunpowder explosion, which caused several fires aboard (which were speedily put out) and killed and wounded eighteen men. (Note: Basse's own coat caught fire in the accident.) Nevertheless, he kept firing, but had to bear away to save his own ship, so he was unable to come to the aid of captain Hides. His excuse was that he had nine more wounded on the gundeck, due mainly to splinters. He was not aided by other ships in his division, except for the ship of captain Browne, that was also disabled, though he praises Browne for his bravery. Others like captain Coolys, did not engage at all, allegedly because he had no ammunition.

The Dutch halted their pursuit around 6.30 PM. The English were exhausted and only managed to repair some of the sails (the longboat and pinnace of the London were also shot away). The next morning Basse caught up with captains Earwin and Browne. The captains had dinner aboard Browne's ship and held a council of war, during which it was decided to sail south of São Tomé, for fear of otherwise encountering the Dutch again. Aboard the London several wounded died of their wounds.

== Aftermath ==
The siege of São Tomé would last until late August 1674, when the French garrison capitulated to Van Goens. The capitulation of the French garrison was due to its lack of supplies of food and gunpowder. As the VOC had agreed with the sultan of Golconda that the town would be handed back and demolished, the Dutch would not retain the port. This would also benefit the EIC officials in Madras and they were very eager to see the destruction of this neighbouring town, going so far as to write to the sultan, urging him to demolish it quickly. Still, the French and English East India Companies had been unable to seriously undermine the VOC's strong position in both the intercontinental route and in intra-Asian trades during the war.

== Sources ==
- Ahmad Khan, Shafaʼat (1926). "Log of the London". Sources for the History of British India in the Seventeenth Century. Oxford University Press. pp. 241–250.
- Blok, P.J.; Molhuysen, P.C. (1924). "Goens, Rijcklof van". Nieuw Nederlandsch biografisch woordenboek. Deel 6 (in Dutch).
- De Jonge, Johannes Cornelis (1859). Geschiedenis van het Nederlandsche zeewezen Deel 2 (PDF) (in Dutch). A.C. Kruseman.
- Odegard, Erik (2020). "Merchant Companies at War: The Anglo-Dutch Wars in Asia". War, Trade and the State: Anglo-Dutch Conflict, 1652-89: 230–247.
