= 1620s in South Africa =

- 1600s 1610s « 1620s » 1630s 1640s
- List of years in South Africa

The following lists events that happened during the 1620s in South Africa.

== Events ==
- 1620
  - Captain Andrew Shillinge and Captain Humphrey Fitzherbert formally annex the shores of Table Bay in the name of King James I.
  - French explorer Augustin de Beaulieu records the Robben Island Earthquake, the first recorded one in the country.
- 1622
  - The Portuguese ship, Sao João Baptista, was lost off the eastern coast of South Africa
