= 16th century in South Africa =

- 14th 15th « 16th century » 1600s 1610s
- List of years in South Africa

== Events ==
=== 1500s ===
- 1503 - Antonio de Saldanha, leading a Portuguese squadron, enters Table Bay due to a navigational error. De Saldanha and his squadron become the first Europeans to climb Table Mountain, formerly known as Hoerikwagga. The Portuguese begin to actively explore the South African coastline, and eventually establish early contact with the Khoikhoi people. De Saldanha and his men attempt to trade with the local Khoikhoi people, offering mirrors, glass beads, and a rattle for two sheep and a cow. The Khoikhoi realize the unfair deal, and ambush De Saldanha and his men to reclaim their animals.

=== 1510s ===
- 1510: The Viceroy of Portuguese India, Francisco d'Almeida, is killed in a skirmish with Khoi-Khoi near Salt River in Table Bay due to a misunderstanding over barter.
- Portuguese traders bypass the Cape, using Robben Island for fresh meat and water.

=== 1550s ===
- 8 June 1552 - The Portuguese galleon São João is wrecked north of the Great Fish River, on return from the East. Only 64 out of the 473 crew members survive, including navigator and cartographer Manuel de Mesquita Perestrelo. They undertook a 165 days march to the mouth of the Maputo River in what is now Mozambique.
- 1554 - The Portuguese ship Saint Benedict is shipwrecked on the coast of what is now called St. Lucia. The survivors named the estuary Rio dos Medos do Ouro (alternatively Rio dos Médãos do Ouro — River of the Gold Dunes)
- 1554 - Sebastian Munster creates the earliest map of Africa.

=== 1560s ===
- 1564 - Shipwreck of São Bento in 1554 is described by Portuguese mariner and cartographer Manuel de Mesquita Perestrelo. This is the first book exclusively about South African events.
- 1564 - The first British slave ship, named "The Jesus Ship," sets sail for Africa.

=== 1570s ===
- 13 December 1575 - on the feast of Saint Lucy, Manuel Peresterello renamed Rio dos Medos do Ouro to Santa Lucia

=== 1580s ===
- Portugal maintains contact and interaction with South Africa, as a land and as a people, during the reign of King Sebastian.
- 18 July 1580 - An English admiral, Sir Francis Drake, rounded the Cape on his voyage round the world. He called it "a most stately thing and the fairest cape we saw in the whole circumference of the earth".
- 1589 - The Portuguese ship Sao Thome is shipwrecked near Sodwana Bay

=== 1590s ===
The British & Dutch regularly stop at Table Bay for Asia trade. The Khoikhoi begin to trade iron, copper & marijuana with the Europeans.

- 1591 - English navigator James Lancaster trades sheep at Saldanha Bay, describing them as large, wool-less, big tailed, and with good mutton.
- 1593 - A Portuguese ship, the Santo Alberto is lost off the coast of what is now known as the Wild Coast, Eastern Cape Province. It is believed to be near the Mthatha River
- 1594 - 1601 - James Lancaster, an English navigator, explores the southern African coast and establishes trade relationships with the Khoikhoi
- 1595 - Four ships under Cornelis de Houtman reach São Bras.
- 1595 - The Dutch make their first contact with the coast of Southern Africa.
- 1595 - An early trade relations agreement is signed between Dutch sailors aboard the 'Mauritius' and the Khoikhoi locals near Mossel Bay.

== Deaths ==
- 29 May 1500 - Bartolomeu Dias drowns at sea near the Cape of Good Hope
- 1 March 1510 - Francisco de Almeida, the Viceroy of Portuguese India, is killed by the Khoikhoi at the mouth of the Salt River in Table Bay, after engaging in provocations towards the indigenous people

== Bibliography ==
- Steenkamp, Willem (2012). Assegais, Drums & Dragoons: The Untold Military History of the Old Cape 1510 - 1806. Johannesburg: Jonathan Ball Publishers. ISBN 978-1-86842-479-5.
- See also Years in South Africa for further sources
