= 1610s in South Africa =

- 16th century 1600s « 1610s » 1620s 1630s
- List of years in South Africa

The following lists events that happened during the 1610s in South Africa.

- 1615
  - Sir Thomas Roe attempts to land deported British criminals at the Cape.
  - Many British criminals are drowned or killed by Khiokhoi.
