= 1630s in South Africa =

- 1610s 1620s « 1630s » 1640s 1650s
- List of years in South Africa

The following lists events that happened during the 1630s in South Africa.

== Events ==
=== 1631 ===
- The British capture Autshumao, the chief of Goringhaikonas Khoi-Khoi, and take him to Batavia. Autshumao later returns to the Cape to act as a resident agent, postmaster, and translator for ships.
- Groote Catrijn van Palicatta is born in India, later to be exiled to the Cape of Good Hope.

=== 1632 ===
- Autshumao asks passing sailors to ferry him and 20 followers to Robben Island. Autshumao's Robben Island group are protected from mainland Khoikhoi enemies, with food such as penguins and seals provided for the group. Autshumao travels to Java and back to South Africa.
- 23 Dutch sailors killed after allegedly attempting to steal cattle.

=== 1635 ===
- The Portuguese Nossa Senhora runs aground near the mouth of the Umzimkulu River

== Bibliography ==
See Years in South Africa for other sources.
