= 15th century in South Africa =

- 13th 14th « 15th » 16th century 1600s
- List of years in South Africa

== Events ==
=== 1430s ===
- The Kingdom of Mutapa, centred on Great Zimbabwe is founded which today forms part of Limpopo province South Africa.

=== 1480s ===
In 1487-87, Bartolomeu Dias (or Bartholomew Dias) a Portuguese navigator sailed south along the coast of Southern Africa as far as the Orange River, was blown out to sea and made landfall at Mossel Bay and Algoa Bay. But at the Fish River his men refused to go any further. He sailed round the Cape of Good Hope, named by either Dias or his patron, King John II of Portugal for the “great hope it gave of discovering the Indies”.

- 12 March 1488 - Bartolomeu Dias lands at what is to become Mossel Bay in the Western Cape Province and erects the first padrão (stone cross) on the South African coast
- 6 June 1488 - Bartolomeu Dias erects the second padrão (stone cross), that's north-east of St. Philip, in Cape Maclear, south of Cape Point, on his return journey to Portugal

=== 1490s ===
In 1497-99, Vasco da Gama a Portuguese navigator sighted land at St. Helena Bay, doubled the Cape, passed up the coast of Natal at Christmastide and named it, and reached Arab Mozambique. He had discovered a route to India. His patron was the successor to John II, Manuel the Fortunate.

- 22 November 1497 - Vasco da Gama discovers the sea route to India around the Cape of Good Hope
- 25 December 1497 - Vasco da Gama anchored at present day Durban and named it Rio De Natal
- Bakoena City State is established 1500s
