= Hendrik Crudop =

Dutch colonial governor

Acting Commander of the Cape
- In office 29 June 1678 – 12 October 1679
- Preceded by: Johan Bax van Herenthals
- Succeeded by: Simon van der Stel

Personal details
- Born: c. 1646 Bremen
- Died: after 1720
- Spouse: Catharina de Vooght

Hendrik Crudop (c. 1646 – after 1720) was a VOC official who also acted as commander at the Cape of Good Hope after the death of Commander Johan Bax van Herenthals in 1678 until the arrival of Simon van der Stel.

== Career ==
Crudop arrived at the Cape in 1668 as a midship man and in the same year became steward to Commander Cornelis van Quaelberg and later to Commander Jacob Borghorst, a position which he held 'with considerable diligence and success'. Since the VOC's policy was to reduce its expenses, Crudop had in 1671 to combine the duties of fiscal, secretary of the Council of Policy and accountant. In addition, he acted as president of the Orphan Chamber from 1674, became the Company's storekeeper in 1675. In 1676 he was appointed secunde (second in command). He obtained the rank of merchant when appointed as secunde but retained all his previous duties.

After the death of Johan Bax van Herenthals on 29 June 1678, he acted as Commander until 12 October 1679. In 1680, he asked the visiting Commissioner Sybrand Abbema for a transfer to Batavia. His request was granted in 1680 and in 1681 he was appointed Governor of Honimoa in the Governorate of Ambon. Illness however forced him to return to Batavia in 1682 and after he recovered, he was appointed secunde at Banda in January 1684 and four days later became senior merchant. In 1687 he was appointed secunde of Amboyna in the Governorate of Ambonand in 1720 he was still mentioned in the Monsterrollen of Batavia among the officials of the VOC.

== Personal ==
Crudop was the son of Hinrich Krutop and his wife Ilsabe Grothaus. He married Catharina de Vooght in 1671 and the couple had three sons. The youngest son, Johan Adriaan became Councillor Ordinary of the Dutch East Indies in Batavia.

== See also ==
- 1670s in South Africa
