= 1640s in South Africa =

- 1620s 1630s « 1640s » 1650s 1660s
- List of years in South Africa

The following lists events that happened during the 1640s in South Africa.

== 1643 ==
- 1643 - The Portuguese ship, Santa Maria Madre de Deus is wrecked off the South African east coast

== 1647 ==
- 25 March 1647 - The Dutch ship Nieuwe Haerlem is wrecked in Table Bay and survivors later build a small fort. Nieuwe Haerlem survivor Leendert Janszen and some crew stay in Table Bay to guard cargo until a Dutch ship rescues them a year later. The Nieuwe Haerlem shipwreck is later found on Blouberg's shores many years on.
- The Portuguese ship, Sacromento is wrecked off the South African east coast near Port Edward. Another Portuguese ship Nossa Serihora da Atalayais also lost off Keiskamma Point near between East London and Port Elizabeth
- Leendert Janszen and Matthijs Proot write a feasibility report on establishing a refreshment station at the Cape.

== 1649 ==
- Leendert Janszen and Matthijs Proot present the 'Remonstrantie', advocating for a Dutch refreshment station, fort, and garden at the Cape.
- Jan van Riebeeck serves on a ship that took on castaways from the Nieuwe Haerlem in Table Bay.
- Jan van Riebeeck supports the proposal, and is later appointed by the VOC to establish the station.
- Maria de la Queillerie marries Jan van Riebeeck, and they have 8 children between them.

== Bibliography ==
See Years in South Africa for other sources.
