= Albert van Breugel =

Dutch colonial governor

Acting Commander of the Cape
- In office April 1672 – 2 October 1672
- Preceded by: Pieter Hackius
- Succeeded by: Isbrand Goske

Personal details
- Died: 1687
- Spouse: Johanna Lenartsz

Albert van Breugel was the acting commander of the Cape of Good Hope between April 1672 and 2 October 1672. He succeeded Governor Pieter Hackius after his death on 30 November 1671. Between Hackius's death and Breugel's appointment, the administration in the Cape was overseen by the Political Council.

== Biography ==
Van Breugel was appointed merchant and secunde (second in command) at the Cape in 1672. As the newly appointed Governor, Isbrand Goske, had not then arrived, he acted in his place until 2 October 1672. After Goske took control, it soon became apparent that he was not happy with the way Van Breugel handled the administration. Goske was specifically dissatisfied with how he handled the company's books and kept them up to date. In February 1676, the VOC Commissioner Nicolaas Verburg decided to send Van Breugel to Batavia, since his administration showed a big financial deficit.

After arriving in Batavia in August 1676, the Council of Justice acquitted him of Goske's charges. During 1680 he was elected a member of the College of Schepenen of Batavia and in January 1684, with the title of senior merchant, he became secunde in Banda, only to retire at his own request a month later due to ill health. He was succeeded by Hendrik Crudop.

== See also ==
- 1670s in South Africa
