= Dutch Cape Colony =

Former Dutch supply station in Southern Africa (1652–1806)

Cape of Good Hope Nederlandse Kaapkolonie
- 1652–1795; 1803–1806
- Flag Coat of arms
- Anthem: "Wilhelmus van Nassouwe" (Dutch) "'William of Nassau"
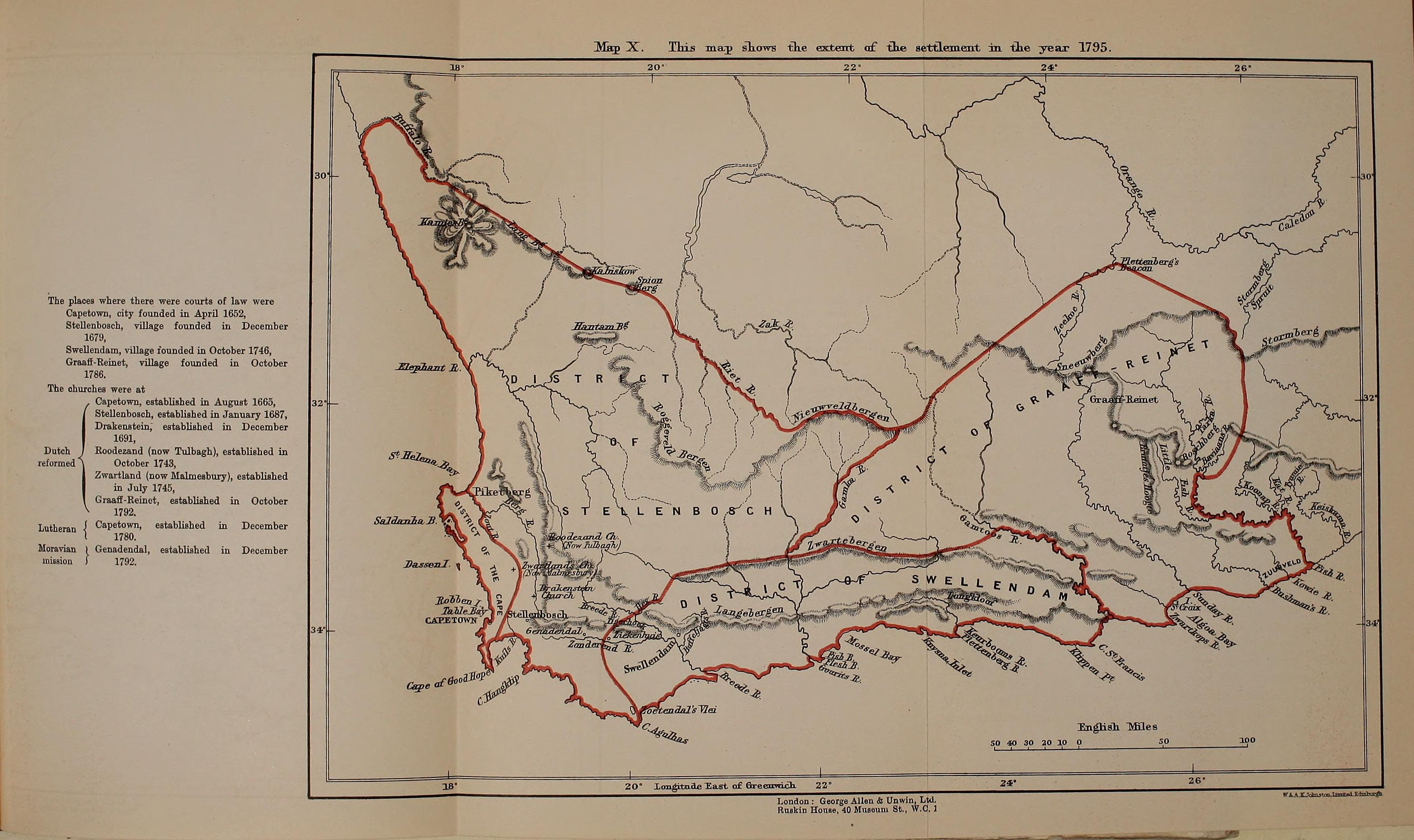
- VOC Cape at its largest extent in 1795
- Status: Supply station under Company rule (1652–1795); British occupation (1795–1803); Colony of the Batavian Republic (1803–1806)
- Capital: Castle of Good Hope (1st); Kaapstad (2nd)
- Official languages: Dutch
- Common languages: Early Afrikaans; Khoikhoi isiXhosa; Malay
- Religion: Dutch Reformed native beliefs
- Governor
  - 1652–1662: Jan van Riebeeck
  - 1662–1666: Zacharias Wagenaer
  - 1771–1785: Joachim van Plettenberg
  - 1803–1806: Jan Willem Janssens
- Historical era: Colonialism
  - Establishment of Cape Town: 6 April 1652
  - Elevated to Governorate: 1691
  - First British occupation: 7 August 1795
  - Cape Colony to Dutch rule: 1 March 1803
  - British occupation: 8–18 January 1806
  - Official relinquishment: 13 August 1814

Area
  - Total: 145,000 km^{2} (56,000 sq mi)

Population
  - 1797: 61,947
- Currency: Dutch rijksdaalder
Preceded by
Khoekhoe people
Succeeded by
British Cape Colony
Republic of Graaff-Reinet
Republic of Swellendam
- Today part of: South Africa

The Dutch Cape Colony (Dutch: Nederlandse Kaapkolonie), officially known as the Cape of Good Hope Waystation (Dutch: Tussenstation Kaap de Goede Hoop), was a colony of the Dutch East India Company (VOC) and Batavian Republic in Southern Africa. Centered on the Cape of Good Hope, from where it derived its name, it was founded in 1652 by a VOC expedition under Jan van Riebeeck to serve as a re-supply and layover port for VOC vessels trading with Asia. The Cape was under VOC rule from 1652 to 1795 and Batavian rule from 1803 to 1806. Much to the dismay of the VOC's shareholders, who focused primarily on making profits from the Asian trade, the Cape Colony rapidly expanded into a settler colony in the years after its founding.

As the only permanent settlement of the VOC which served as a trading post, it proved an ideal retirement place for employees of the company. After several years of service in the company, an employee could lease a piece of land in the Cape Colony as a Free Burgher, on which he had to cultivate crops that he had to sell to the VOC for a fixed price. As these farms were labour-intensive, Free Burghers imported slaves from Madagascar, Mozambique and Asia (mostly the Dutch East Indies and Dutch Ceylon), which rapidly increased the number of inhabitants. After King Louis XIV of France issued the Edict of Fontainebleau in October 1685 (revoking the Edict of Nantes of 1598), thereby ending protection of the right of Huguenots in France to practise Protestant worship without persecution from the state, the Cape Colony attracted some Huguenot settlers, who eventually mixed with the general Dutch population.

Due to the authoritarian rule of the company (telling farmers what to grow for what price, controlling immigration, and monopolising trade), some farmers tried to escape the rule of the company by moving further inland. The company, in an effort to control these migrants, established a magistracy at Swellendam in 1745 and another at Graaff Reinet in 1786, and declared the Gamtoos River as the eastern frontier of the Cape, only to see the Trekboers cross it soon afterwards. In order to keep out Cape native pastoralists, organised increasingly under the rising Xhosa people, the VOC agreed in 1780 to make the Great Fish River the boundary of the Cape.

In 1795, after they launched an invasion of the Cape Colony in present-day Cape Town, the British occupied the Cape. Under the terms of the Peace of Amiens of 1802, Britain ceded the Cape back to the Batavian Republic on 1 March 1803, but as the Batavians had nationalized the VOC in 1796, the Cape Colony now became a colony under the direct rule of The Hague. Batavian control did not last long, however, as the outbreak of the Napoleonic Wars on 18 May 1803 invalidated the Peace of Amiens. In January 1806, the British occupied the colony for a second time after their victory at the Battle of Blaauwberg at present-day Bloubergstrand. The Anglo-Dutch Treaty of 1814 confirmed the transfer of sovereignty to Britain.

== History ==
=== United East India Company ===
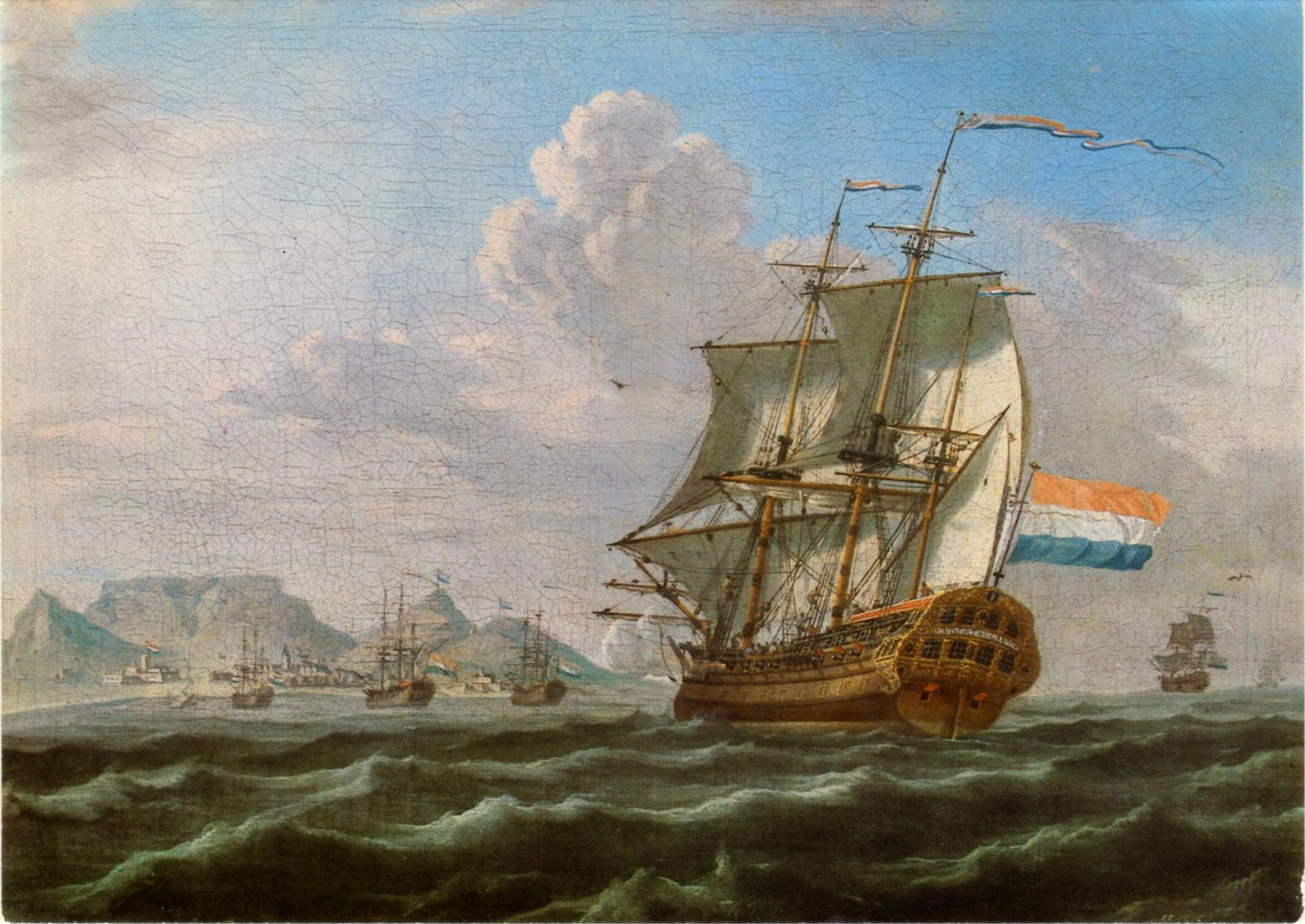
View of Table Bay with ships of the United East India Company (VOC), c. 1763

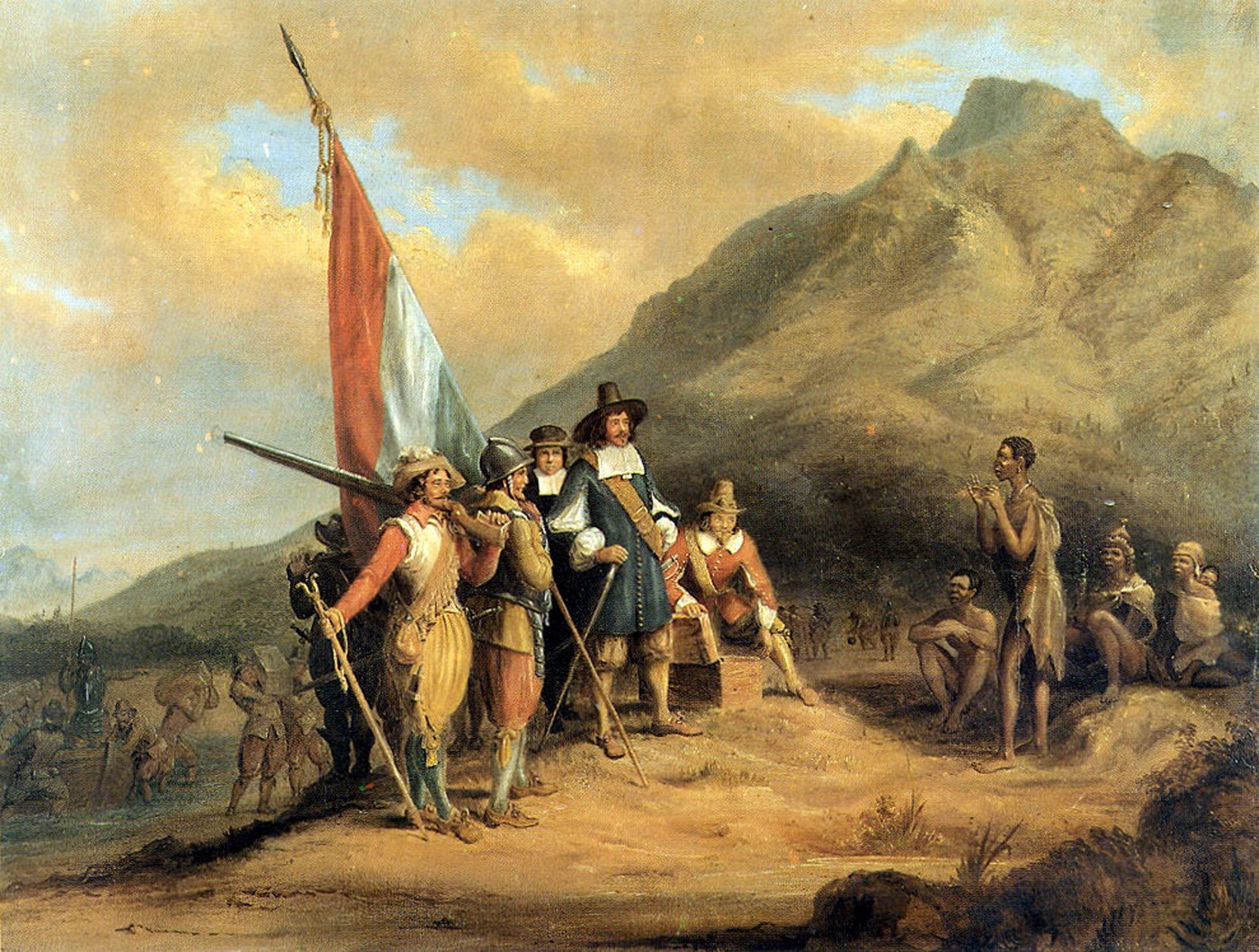
Painting of an account of the arrival of Jan van Riebeeck, by Charles Bell

Traders of the United East India Company (VOC), under the command of Jan van Riebeeck, were the first people to establish a European colony in South Africa. The Cape settlement was built by them in 1652 as a re-supply point and way-station for United East India Company vessels on their way back and forth between the Netherlands and Batavia (Jakarta) in the Dutch East Indies. The support station gradually became a settler community, the forebears of the Boers, and the Cape Dutch who became Afrikaners.

=== Khoi people of the Cape ===
At the time of first European settlement in the Cape, the southwest of Africa was inhabited by Khoikhoi pastoralists and hunters. Disgruntled by the disruption of their seasonal visit to the area for which purpose they grazed their cattle at the foot of Table Mountain only to find European settlers occupying and farming the land, leading to the first Khoi-Dutch War as part of a series of Khoikhoi–Dutch Wars. After the war, the natives ceded the land to the settlers in 1660. During a visit in 1672, the high-ranking Commissioner Arnout van Overbeke made a formal purchase of the Cape territory, although already ceded in 1660, his reason was to "prevent future disputes".

The ability of the European settlers to produce food at the Cape initiated the decline of the nomadic lifestyle of the Khoi and Tuu speaking peoples since food was produced at a fixed location. Thus by 1672, the permanent indigenous residents living at the Cape had grown substantially. The first school to be built in South Africa by the settlers were for the sake of the slaves who had been rescued from a Portuguese slave ship and arrived at the Cape with the Amersfoort in 1658. Later on, the school was also attended by the children of the indigenes and the Free Burghers. The Dutch language was taught at schools as the main medium for commercial purposes, with the result that the indigenous people and even the French settlers found themselves speaking Dutch more than their native languages. The principles of Christianity were also introduced at the school resulting in the baptisms of many slaves and indigenous residents.

Conflicts with the settlers and the effects of smallpox decimated their numbers in 1713 and 1755, until gradually the breakdown of their society led them to be scattered and ethnically cleansed beyond the colonial frontiers: both beyond the Eastward-expanding frontier (to form eventually the future resisting population of the frontier wars), as well as beyond the Northern open frontier war above the Great Escarpment.

Some worked for the colonists, mostly as shepherds and herdsmen.

=== Free Burghers ===
The VOC favoured the idea of freemen at the Cape and many settlers requested to be discharged in order to become free burghers; as a result, Jan van Riebeeck approved the notion on favorable conditions and earmarked two areas near the Liesbeek River for farming purposes in 1657. The two areas which were allocated to the freemen, for agricultural purposes, were named Groeneveld and Dutch Garden. These areas were separated by the Amstel River (Liesbeek River). Nine of the best applicants were selected to use the land for agricultural purposes. The freemen or free burghers as they were afterwards termed, thus became subjects, and were no longer servants, of the company.

=== Trekboers ===
After the first settlers spread out around the Company station, nomadic European livestock farmers, or Trekboeren, moved more widely afield, leaving the richer, but limited, farming lands of the coast for the drier interior tableland. There they contested still wider groups of Khoe-speaking cattle herders for the best grazing lands.

The Cape society in this period was thus a diverse one. The emergence of Afrikaans reflects this diversity, from its roots as a Dutch pidgin, to its subsequent creolisation and use as "Kitchen Dutch" by slaves and serfs of the colonials, and its later use in Cape Islam by them when it first became a written language that used the Arabic letters. By the time of British rule after 1795, the sociopolitical foundations were firmly laid.

=== British conquest ===
In 1795, France occupied the Dutch Republic. This prompted Great Britain, at war with France, to occupy the territory that same year as a way to better control the seas on the way to India. The British sent a fleet of nine warships which anchored at Simon's Town and, following the defeat of the Dutch militia at the Battle of Muizenberg, took control of the territory. The United East India Company transferred its territories and claims to the Batavian Republic (the Dutch sister republic established by France) in 1798, then ceased to exist in 1799. Improving relations between Britain and Napoleonic France, and its vassal state the Batavian Republic, led the British to hand the Cape Colony over to the Batavian Republic in 1803, under the terms of the Treaty of Amiens.

In 1806, the Cape, now nominally controlled by the Batavian Republic, was occupied again by the British after their victory in the Battle of Blaauwberg. The peace between Britain and Napoleonic France had broken after one year, while Napoleon had been strengthening his influence on the Batavian Republic (which he would replace with a monarchy later that year). The British established their colony to control the Far East trade routes. In 1814 the Dutch government formally ceded sovereignty over the Cape to the British, under the terms of the Convention of London.

== Administrative divisions ==
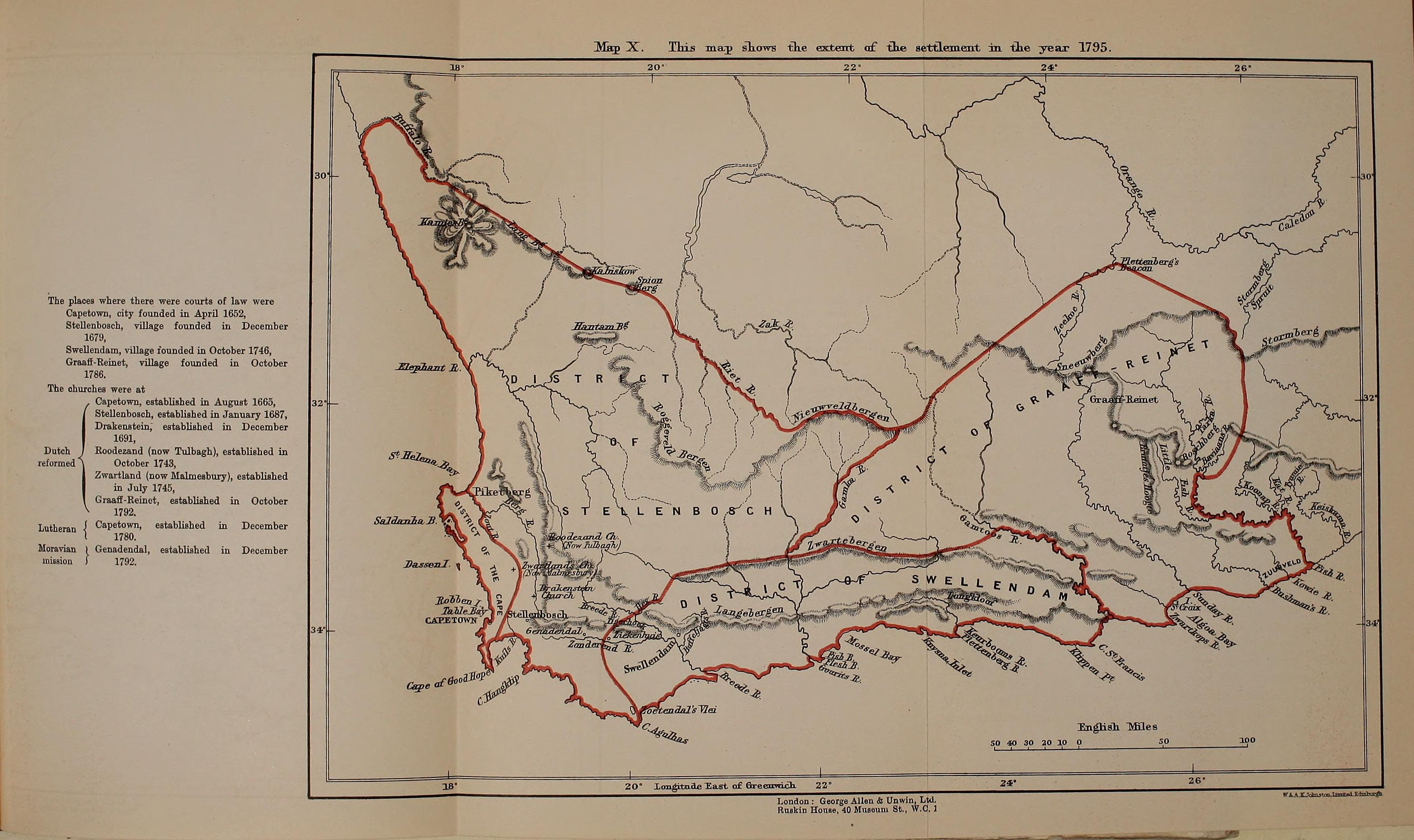
Administrative divisions of the Cape Colony on the eve of the 1795 British occupation

The Dutch Cape Colony was divided into four districts. In 1797 their "recorded" populations were:

District	Free Christians	Slaves	"Hottentots"	Total (1797)
District of the Cape	6,261	11,891	-	18,152
District of Stellenbosch and Drakenstein	7,256	10,703	5,000	22,959
District of Zwellendam	3,967	2,196	500	6,663
District of Graaff Reynet	4,262	964	8,947	14,173

== Demographics ==
During this period a significant proportion of marriages were interracial, this is at least partially attributed to a lack of 'White' or 'Christian' women within the colony. What later became the racial division between 'White' and 'non-White' populations originally began as a division between Christian and non-Christian populations. The Geslags-registeers estimated that seven percent of the Afrikaner gene pool in 1807 was non-White.

Year	White men	White women	White children	White total	Total population	Source/notes
1658					360	Recorded population of Cape Town only.
1701	418	242	295	1,265	–	Excluding indentured servants.
1723	679	433	544	2,245	–	Excluding indentured servants.
1753	1,478	1,026	1,396	5,419	–	Excluding indentured servants.
1773	2,300	1,578	2,138	8,285	–	Excluding indentured servants.
1795	4,259	2,870	3,963	14,929		Excluding indentured servants.
1796	–	–	–	–	61,947	Total for all groups.

== Commanders and Governors of the Cape Colony (1652–1806) ==
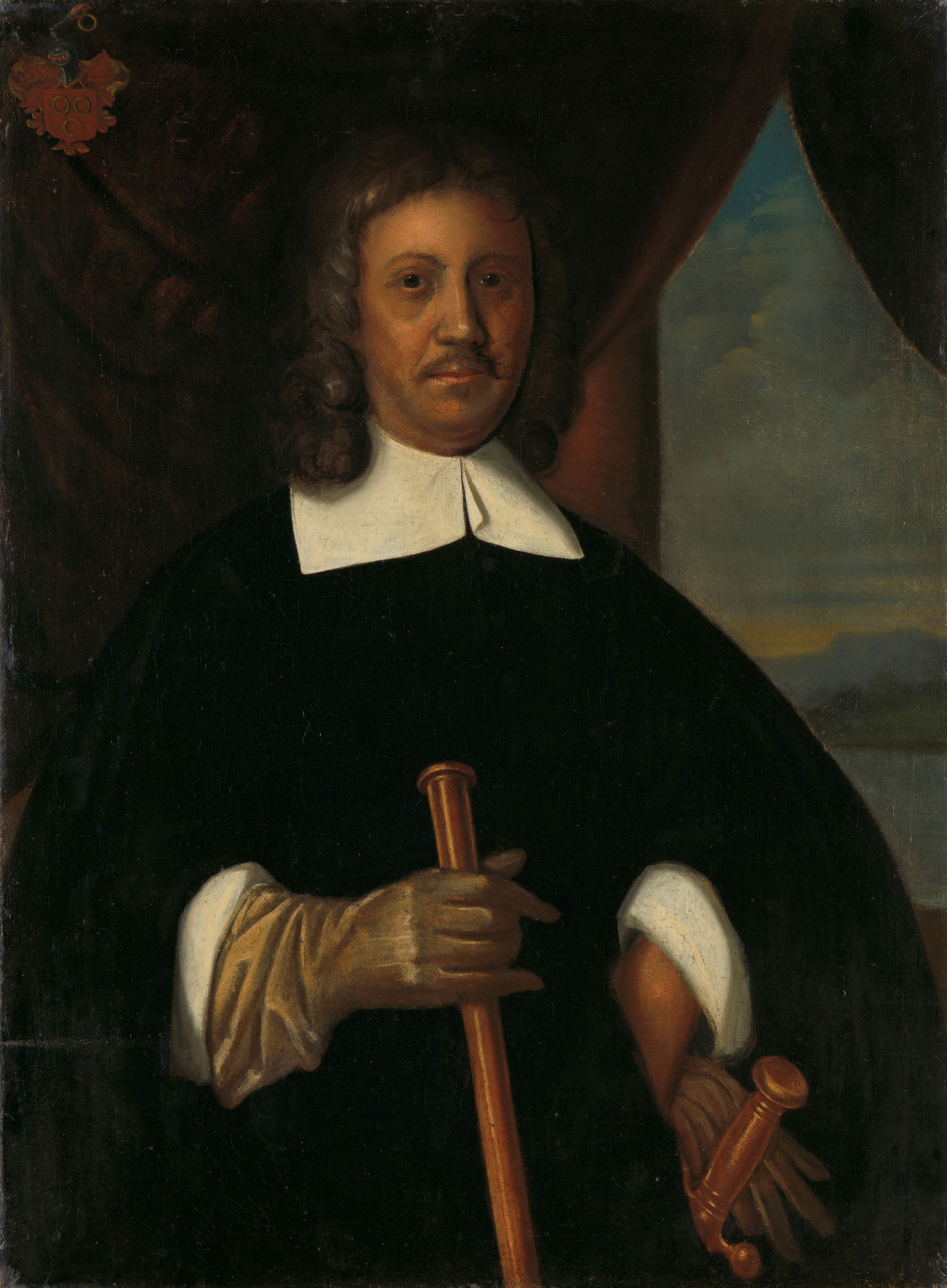
Portrait of Jan van Riebeeck

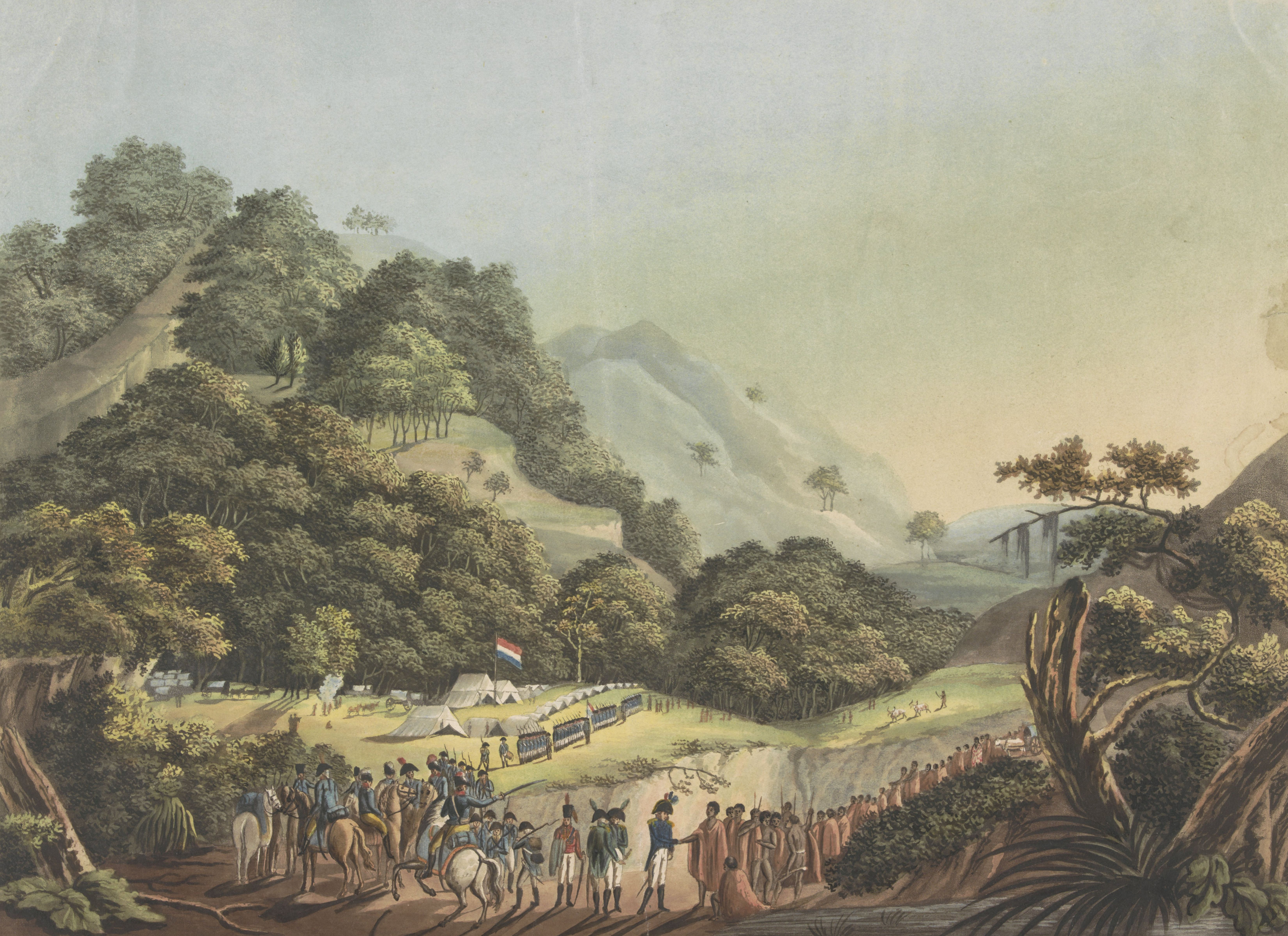
Meeting between Governor Janssens and the Xhosa chief Gaika in 1803

The title of the founder of the Cape Colony, Jan van Riebeeck, was installed as "Commander of the Cape", a position he held from 1652 to 1662. During the tenure of Simon van der Stel, the colony was elevated to the rank of a governorate, hence he was promoted to the position of "Governor of the Cape".

Commanders of the Cape Colony (1652–1691)
Name	Period	Title
Jan van Riebeeck	7 April 1652 – 6 May 1662	Commander
Zacharias Wagenaer	6 May 1662 – 27 September 1666	Commander
Cornelis van Quaelberg	27 September 1666 – 18 June 1668	Commander
Jacob Borghorst	18 June 1668 – 25 March 1670	Commander
Pieter Hackius	25 March 1670 – 30 November 1671	Commander and Governor
	1671–1672	Acting Council
Albert van Breugel	April 1672 – 2 October 1672	Acting Commander
Isbrand Goske	2 October 1672 – 14 March 1676	Governor
Johan Bax van Herenthals	14 March 1676 – 29 June 1678	Commander
Hendrik Crudop	29 June 1678 – 12 October 1679	Acting Commander
Simon van der Stel	10 December 1679 – 1 June 1691	Commander, after 1691 Governor

Governors of the Cape Colony (1691–1795)
Name	Period	Title
Simon van der Stel	1 June 1691 – 2 November 1699	Governor
Willem Adriaan van der Stel	2 November 1699 – 3 June 1707	Governor
Johan Cornelis d'Ableing	3 June 1707 – 1 February 1708	Acting Governor
Louis van Assenburgh	1 February 1708 – 27 December 1711	Governor
Willem Helot (acting)	27 December 1711 – 28 March 1714	Acting Governor
Maurits Pasques de Chavonnes	28 March 1714 – 8 September 1724	Governor
Jan de la Fontaine (acting)	8 September 1724 – 25 February 1727	Acting Governor
Pieter Gysbert Noodt	25 February 1727 – 23 April 1729	Governor
Jan de la Fontaine	23 April 1729 – 8 March 1737	Acting Governor
Jan de la Fontaine	8 March 1737 – 31 August 1737	Governor
Adriaan van Kervel	31 August 1737 – 19 September 1737 (died after three weeks in office)	Governor
Daniël van den Henghel	19 September 1737 – 14 April 1739	Acting Governor
Hendrik Swellengrebel	14 April 1739 – 27 February 1751	Governor
Ryk Tulbagh	27 February 1751 – 11 August 1771	Governor
Baron Joachim van Plettenberg	12 August 1771 – 18 May 1774	Acting Governor
Baron Pieter van Reede van Oudtshoorn	1772 – 23 January 1773 (died at sea on his way to the Cape)	Governor designate
Baron Joachim van Plettenberg	18 May 1774 – 14 February 1785	Governor
Cornelis Jacob van de Graaff	14 February 1785 – 24 June 1791	Governor
Johan Isaac Rhenius	24 June 1791 – 3 July 1792	Acting Governor
Sebastiaan Cornelis Nederburgh and Simon Hendrik Frijkenius	3 July 1792 – 2 September 1793	Commissioners-General
Abraham Josias Sluysken	2 September 1793 – 16 September 1795	Commissioner-General

Governors of the First British occupation (1797–1803)
Name	Period	Title
George Macartney, 1st Earl Macartney	1797–1798	Governor
Francis Dundas (1st time)	1798–1799	Acting Governor
Sir George Yonge	1799–1801	Governor
Francis Dundas (2nd time)	1801–1803	Governor

Governors of the Cape Colony for the Batavian Republic (1803–1806)
Name	Period	Title
Jacob Abraham Uitenhage de Mist	1803–1804	Governor
Jan Willem Janssens	1804–1807	Governor

== Sources ==
- Van der Merwe, Petrus Johannes (1995). The Migrant Farmer in the History of the Cape Colony, 1657–1842. Athens: Ohio University Press. ISBN 978-0-8214-1090-5.
- Theal, George McCall (1887). History of the Boers in South Africa; Or, the Wanderings and Wars of the Emigrant Farmers from Their Leaving the Cape Colony to the Acknowledgment of Their Independence by Great Britain. London: S. Sonnenschein, Lowrey.
- Ross, Robert John (1999). Status and Respectability in the Cape Colony, 1750–1870: A Tragedy of Manners (PDF). African studies series. Cambridge (GB): Cambridge University Press. ISBN 978-0-521-62122-9.
