= IJsbrand Godske =

Dutch politician

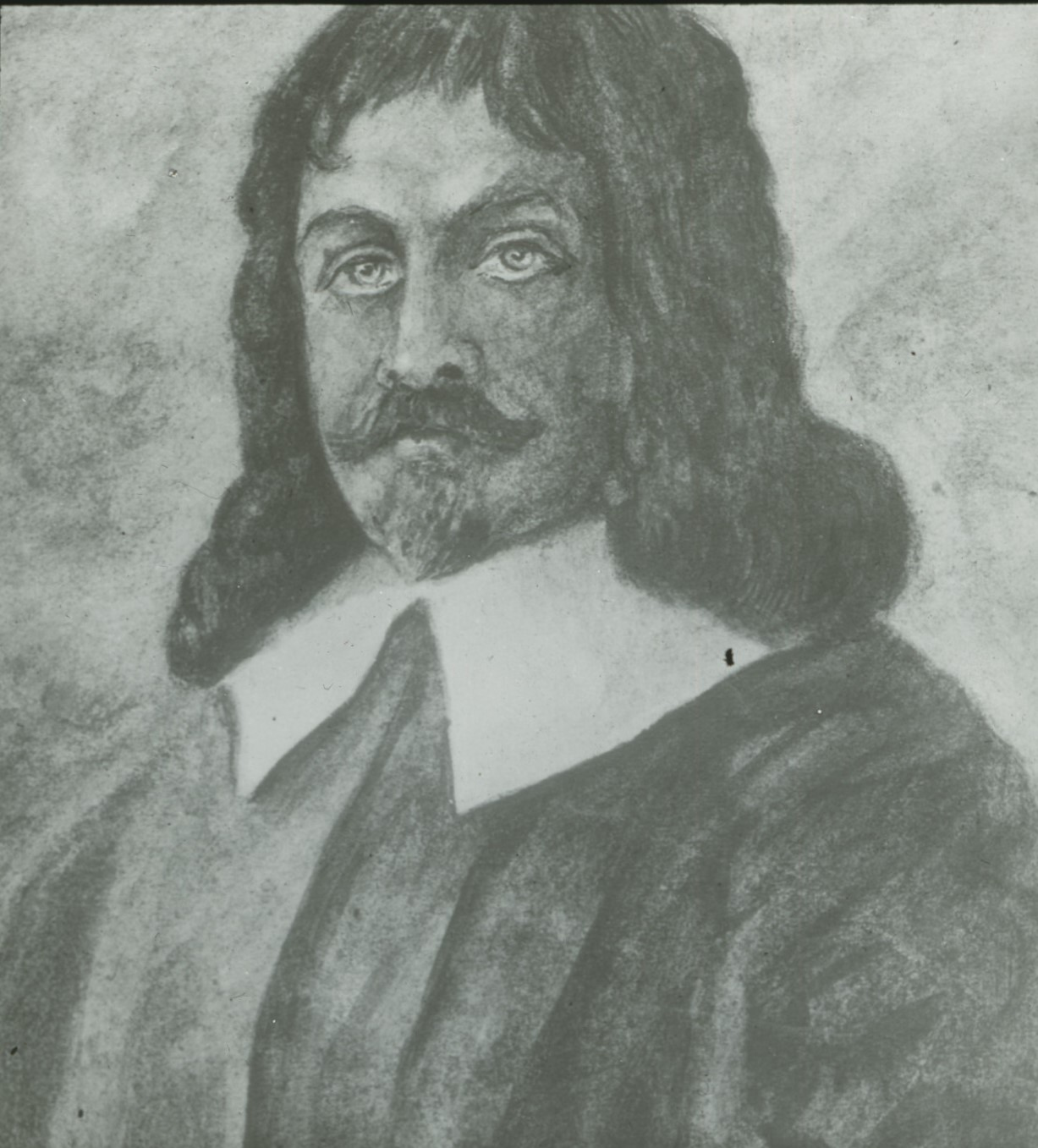

Governor and Councillor of the Cape
- In office 2 October 1672 – 14 March 1674
- Preceded by: Albert van Breugel (acting)
- Succeeded by: Johan Bax van Herenthals

Personal details
- Born: c. 1626 The Hague

IJsbrand Godske (also spelled Isbrand, Usbrand, Goske, or Godsken) (c. 1626 – after 1689) was the second Governor of the Dutch Cape Colony. After the death of Governor Pieter Hackius's on 30 November 1671, Godske was appointed to succeed him with the title of Governor and Councillor Extraordinary of India. For the time it took him to arrive at the Cape, first the Political Council and from 23 March 1672 to 2 October 1672, the secunde, Albert van Breugel, acted as governor.

== Early life ==
Godske was the eldest son of Johan Goske of Holstein, an armourer to the Prince of Orange, and his wife Aefgen IJsbrants of the Hague. His birthday is unknown, but, in a legal document dated 12 September 1671, his age is given as forty-five.

== Career ==
In November 1654, Godske was holding the rank of merchant in the VOC and a member of a mission to the king of Kandy, in Ceylon. From 1656 to 1661 he commanded the important VOC office at Galle, Ceylon. Godske left the Company's service in 1661, but then decided to take part in the conquest of Cochin under Rijckloff van Goens and only returned to the Netherlands in September 1662. Godske also distinguished himself as a soldier in the sieges of Colombo and Mannar Island.

In March 1664 Godske again left for the East Indies and while at the Cape, in 1665, recommended a suitable site for the new fort or castle which was to replace the existing Fort de Goede Hoop. On 11 November 1665, two days after his arrival at Batavia, he became commander of Dutch Malabar and on 1 September 1668 director of the VOC factory at Gamron in Persia, a position he held until 1670. As commander of the return fleet he arrived again at the Cape in 1671. During his three and a half weeks stay at the Cape, he made several decisions concerning the fortification of the settlement and made many recommendations about administration in the instructions which he left for Commander Pieter Hackius. This experience led to his appointment as Governor in October 1672.

During his tenure, the Castle was finished and the Hottentots-Holland district was opened on the western edge of settled lands with its own cattle station. He also waged early battles in the Khoikhoi-Dutch Wars with the raiding Khoikhoi chief Gonnema. He served for four years and started off concentrating on social legislation, including establishing the first Orphan Chamber (Afrikaans: Weeskamer, a body dedicated to resolving estate issues) in 1674. Godske was sent to preserve the peace at the time of Third Anglo-Dutch War. Needed in the Netherlands after the war's end, he returned there in 1676.

== See also ==
- 1670s in South Africa

== Sources ==
- Büttner, H.D. (1980). Kennis: die eerste Afrikaanse ensiklopedie in kleur, vol. 8., pp. 1474–1475. Cape Town:Human & Rousseau. ISBN 0 7981 0830 4
