= Cornelis van Quaelberg =

3rd Commander of the Cape
- In office 27 September 1666 – 18 June 1668
- Preceded by: Zacharias Wagenaer
- Succeeded by: Jacob Borghorst

8th Governor of Dutch Malacca
- In office 27 September 1680 – 18 June 1684
- Preceded by: Jacob Joriszoon Pits
- Succeeded by: Nicolaas Schaghen

Personal details
- Born: 1623 Amsterdam
- Died: 3 February 1689 (aged 65–66) Batavia

Cornelis van Quaelberg, also written as van Quaelbergen or van Quaalberg (c.1623 – 3 February 1687) was the third commander of the Dutch Cape Colony from 1666 to 1668.

== Career ==
Van Quaelberg began his career in the service of the Dutch East India Company in 1639 when he was appointed as assistant to the Coromandel Coast. He was promoted Junior merchant in 1644, merchant in 1647 and senior merchant in 1650. In this capacity he was appointed head of Masulipatam, India, in 1652. In 1666 he was appointed as Commander of the Cape Colony where he landed at Table Bay on 25 August 1666 and assumed duty two days later. As the Dutch Republic and England were at war at this time, not much happened during his tenure, except for some additions to the Castle.

He was dismissed from the service of the VOC in 1668 after lending help to a French fleet which he did not know was an enemy because news of the outbreak of war spread slowly. He then went to Batavia and succeeded in convincing the authorities of his innocence and was re-employed in 1670. On 1 September 1673, during the Third Anglo-Dutch War he commanded a VOC fleet that defeated an EIC fleet at Masulipatnam. He was promoted to Governor of Banda in the Indonesian archipelago during 1677 and became Governor of Malacca in 1680 until 1684.

== Personal ==
Van Quaelberg was married to Margaretha de Wit, daughter of Jacob de Wit, Governor of Paliacatta. She died in 1655 and in 1672 he married Henriette Chastelein, with whom he had two daughters. He died on 3 February 1687 in Batavia.

== See also ==
- 1660s in South Africa
