= Johan Bax van Herenthals =

Dutch colonial governor

7th Commander of the Cape
- In office 14 March 1676 – 29 June 1678
- Preceded by: IJsbrand Godske
- Succeeded by: Hendrik Crudop (acting)

Personal details
- Born: 14 March 1637 's-Hertogenbosch
- Died: 24 June 1678 (aged 41) Cape Town

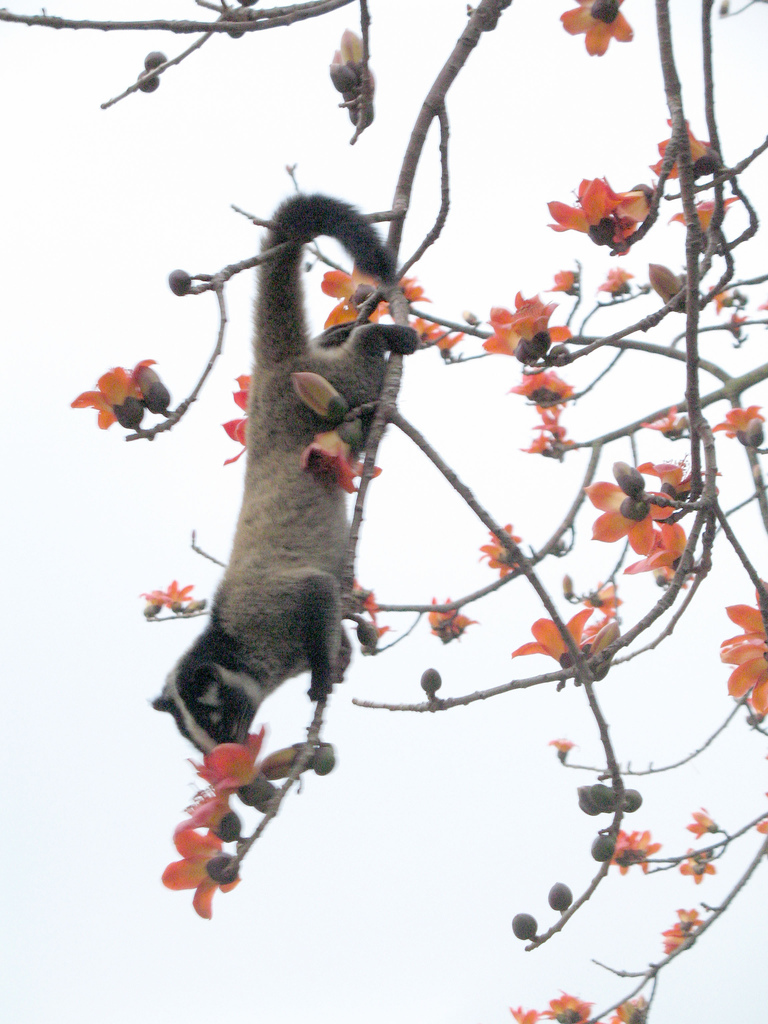
Photo of a civet feeding

Johan Bax van Herenthals (14 March 1637 – 29 June 1678), also written as Joan Bax, and van Herentals, was born in 's-Hertogenbosch and was the governor of the Dutch Cape Colony from 1676 succeeding the acting interim governor IJsbrand Godske. Agriculture developed during his term and he is recognized as contributing to the development of Botany and Ethnobiology. He declared two wars with the Khoikhoi. He died in Cape Town.

== Biography ==
Johan Bax was the grandson of Joan Bax, governor of Heusden and Muiden. His father Willem Maurits, a captain in the Dutch States Army under Willem Ripperda, married Jeanette Hoefijser in 1630 in Deventer. In 1631 Willem moved to Amsterdam, and according to François Valentijn, Johan Bax was born in 1637 in 's-Hertogenbosch. He started his service with the Dutch East India Company around 1656. The following year he arrived in Batavia with Hendrik van Rheede and Isaac de l'Ostal de Saint-Martin. In 1663 he was involved in the attack on the Malabar coast under Rijckloff van Goens, in 1667 he was in Cochin.

In 1669 at the age of 32, Johan Bax married Aletta Hinloopen (1649–1680), the daughter of Jacob Fransz Hinlopen in Batavia. This made Joan Huydecoper II his uncle. Bax served as the successor to Van Rheede in Colombo and Galle. There he and Aletta had a daughter who died within a year. He sent his uncle a mango, an acacia, a coconut, a civet and a Negombo devil.

Bax was governor of the Dutch Cape Colony for two years, during which the status of the Cape Colony was reduced by the Dutch East India Company. Bax sent many specimens in to his uncle Huydecoper such as a herbarium, bulbs and seeds, as well as canaries, parakeets, a monkey and a young rhinoceros. Huydecoper sent Bax a gardener from Maarssen. He was named governor of Dutch Ceylon on 25 October 1678, but he died after a chest infection before he could take that position. He was buried on 4 July 1679 in Cape Town. Due to a shortage of slaves in the Dutch Cape Colony, his widow Aletta sold some of her slaves from Malabar before departing for Batavia.
