= Jacob Borghorst =

4th Commander of the Cape
- In office 18 June 1668 – 25 March 1670
- Preceded by: Cornelis van Quaelberg
- Succeeded by: Pieter Hackius

Jacob Borghorst, also Borchorst, was the fourth Commander of the Dutch Cape Colony from 1668 to 1670, succeeding Cornelis von Quaelberg. He was in ill health for most of his period as Commander, and left most of the administration to his subordinates. Borghorst and his family returned to the Dutch Republic in 1670.

== Background ==
Borghort's family came from North Holland. He entered service with the Dutch East India Company (VOC) as an assistant in India and was promoted to onderkoopman (junior merchant) in 1646. In 1653, he left to become a merchant in Ceylon, leaving in March 1663 as a second-in-command. He served briefly as administrator in Colombo, and several briefings to Jan van Riebeeck in 1655 bear his signature.

On 24 December 1664, after a successful career in the service of the VOC, he left Batavia for Holland on the Phoenix, serving as vice-commander on one of the ships in Pieter de Bitter's return fleet. The fleet stayed in Cape Town from 11 March to 22 April 1665 to resupply. During their return voyage, the Second Anglo-Dutch War broke out, and the valuable return fleet sought shelter in the neutral Norwegian port of Bergen, which was blockaded by a Royal Navy fleet under Vice-admiral Thomas Teddeman.

In the Battle of Vågen, de Bitter successfully resisted an attempt by Teddeman's fleet to capture the return fleet, although the English captured Phoenix on 13 September 1665. Eight bags of gemstones that Borghorst had purchased in Europe to carry all the fortune he had built up over the year were seized by his captors. This likely required him to start over with the VOC, who appointed him to the Cape as Commander in 1667.

== Tenure as Commander ==
Borghorst left Texel, Netherlands, for the Cape on 27 December 1667, aboard the transport ship Hof van Breda, commissioned by the full Lords Seventeen of the VOC in Amsterdam. The ship carried 268 on a difficult journey: poor weather forced two stays in English harbors (only 6 months after the end of the war) as well as in Cape Verde, at the time a Portuguese colony. Most of the crew got sick and 25 of them died during the voyage.

Borghorst arrived at the Cape of Good Hope on 16 June 1668, feeling weak and sick. On Sunday the 17th, Commander Cornelis van Quaelberg, not yet aware of his dismissal, came aboard to greet Borghorst, who came to the fort later that day. On the 18th, Van Quaelberg summoned the entire Political Council of the Colony to a meeting there to discuss the Lords Seventeen's letter replacing him. Due to delays in transferring financial records and inventory, the post (and with it the keys to the gates and stores) were not fully transferred to Borghorst until August 2. Given his illness, most of his duties were handled by bureaucrats such as the fiscal Cornelis de Cretzer, who would later fulfill the same function for equally frail Commander Pieter Hackius and die tragically in slavery in Algeria. Borghorst found the task unbearable and petitioned for dismissal immediately after arrival. The VOC appointed Jan van Aelmonden, a Batavia merchant, as his successor, but he could not arrive in time. Therefore, Hackius was appointed as such and Borghorst continued to serve as commander.

During his tenure as Commander, expeditions were launched inland and down the coast: a small village was founded near Saldanha. Borghorst encouraged grain cultivation and raised cattle himself, but was accused of taking the side of the Khoikhoi in disputes with settlers. He finished the canal from Zacharias Wagenaer's reservoir to the harbor, part of which was rediscovered during the building of the Golden Acre shopping center.

== Departure ==
Hackius and his family arrived on board the ship Sticht van Utrecht on 18 March 1670, and formally took office on the 25th of that month. On 17 April Borghorst formally resigned and left for the Netherlands on the Beemster.

Borghorst apparently was a bachelor in the Cape, and it is unknown if he ever married.

== Sources ==
- Böeseken, Dr. A.J. (1938). Nederlandse commissarissen aan de Kaap. The Hague: Martinus Nijhoff.
- Büttner, H.D. (1980). Kennis: die eerste Afrikaanse ensiklopedie in kleur, vol. 8, pp. 1474-1475. Cape Town: Human & Rousseau. ISBN 0 7981 0830 4
- Catalogue of the Archives of the Dutch Central
- Government of Coastal Ceylon (1640–1796).
- Journal of Fort Batavia – 31 March 1663; 17 May 1664
- Krüger, Prof. D.W. (September 1958). “Jacob Borghorst.” Historia.
- Krüger, Prof. D.W. (ed.) (1972). Suid-Afrikaanse Biografiese Woordeboek. Cape Town: Tafelberg-Uitgewers.
- Picard, Hymen W.J. (1972). Masters of the Castle. Cape Town: C. Struik (Pty) Ltd.
- Molsbergen, EC Godée (1916). Reizen in Zuid-Afrika in de Hollandse tijd. The Hague: Martinus Nijhoff.
- Van Dam, P. (1939). Bescrijvinge der O.I.C. The Hague.
- Warnsinck, J. C. M. (1929). De Retourvloot van Pieter de Bitter. The Hague: Martinus Nijhoff.
