= Zacharias Wagenaer =

Dutch merchant and official (1614–1668)

2nd Commander of the Cape
- In office 6 May 1662 – 27 September 1666
- Preceded by: Jan van Riebeeck
- Succeeded by: Cornelis van Quaelberg

19th Opperhoofd at Dejima
- In office 22 October 1658 – 4 November 1659
- Preceded by: Joan Bouchelion
- Succeeded by: Joan Bouchelion

17th Opperhoofd at Dejima
- In office 1 November 1656 – 27 October 1657
- Preceded by: Joan Bouchelion
- Succeeded by: Joan Bouchelion

Personal details
- Born: 10 May 1614 Dresdner Neustadt
- Died: 12 October 1668 (aged 54) Amsterdam
- Resting place: Oude Kerk, Amsterdam
- Spouse: Anna Auxbrebis

Zacharias Wagenaer (also known as Wagener, Wagenaar and Wagner) (10 May 1614 – 12 October 1668) was a German-born Dutch clerk, illustrator, merchant, member of the Court of Justice, opperhoofd of Deshima and the only German governor of the Dutch Cape Colony. In 35 years he traveled over four continents.

== Biography ==
=== Early life and career ===
Zacharias was the son of a Saxonian judge and a painter. In 1633 he traveled from Dresden via Hamburg to Amsterdam. There he worked for Willem Blaeu. Within a year he enlisted as a soldier in the armed forces of the Dutch West India Company to serve in "New Holland" (Dutch Brazil) in 1634. Three years later, he was hired as a writer by the newly arrived governor of the colony, Count John Maurice, Prince of Nassau-Siegen. In Recife he kept a sort of diary with 109 water-colour drawings of curious fish, strange birds, useful and harmful animals, lovely tasty fruit and nasty, poisonous worms and big, brown or black people, published as "Thier-Buch". There are pictures of the smooth hammerhead, cutlassfish, slender filefish, Serranidae, and Cirripedia. On 1 April 1641, he left Dutch Brazil, and arrived on Texel on 17 June. He traveled back to Dresden arriving 12 October. After four months, he left Dresden to return to the Netherlands arriving at Amsterdam on 29 March 1642, and took a position with the Dutch East India Company (Dutch: Vereenigde Oostindische Compagnie, commonly abbreviated to VOC).

=== Dutch East Indies ===
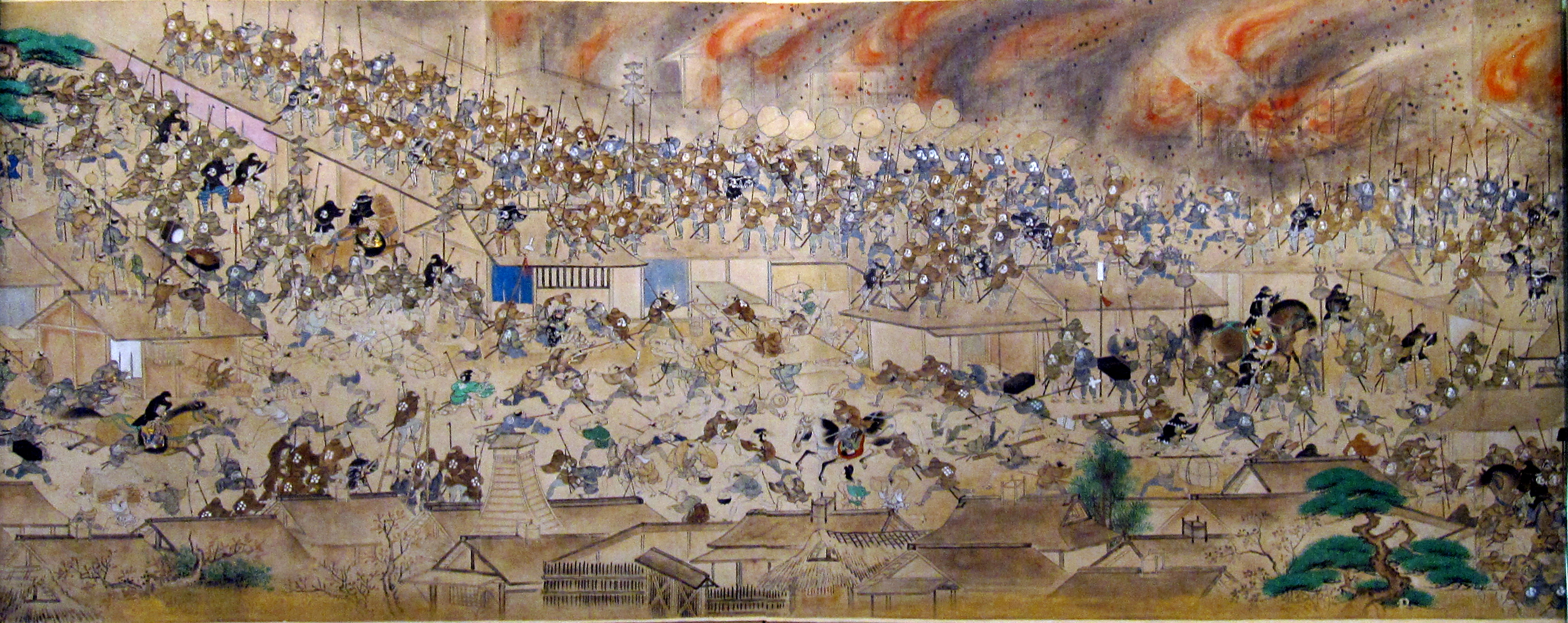
The Great Fire of Meireki that lasted for three days and may have caused 100,000 deaths. Reconstruction efforts took two years, as the shogunate took the opportunity to reorganize the city according to various practical considerations.

On 29 September 1642 he sailed for the Indies as an apprentice officer (Dutch: adelborst). He arrived in Batavia on 17 April 1643 on the Zwaan and was soon after hired by Governor Antonie van Diemen as a copyist. He has been identified as the artist who between June and December 1643 copied more than 50 illustrations into the official journal of Abel Tasman's 1642-43 voyage during which Tasman was the first European to sight Tasmania, New Zealand and several islands in the Tongan Archipelago. In 1646 he became under-merchant and in 1651 merchant. Three times he became a member of the Court of Justice at Batavia. In 1653 he went on a mission to Canton to open up again trade relations, which proved fruitless, due to a civil war after the Fall of the Ming Dynasty.

In 1657 he rose to the rank of opperhoofd (senior official) of the VOC at the small island in Nagasaki bay in the Japanese island of Kyushu, Dejima. He traveled to the capital Edo in a tributary mission and escaped from a burning city, which started on 2 March 1657. (There is a drawing from his hand in the Edo-Tokyo Museum.) In 1659, as one of the first "opperhoofden", he ordered a dinner service, consisting of 200 pieces. Wagener made the design of this Japanese porcelain, according to the European taste white and blue, with many flowers.

In 1660 Wagner was involved in the peace negotiations with the sultan of Makassar. The port had about 2000 Portuguese traders and for years threatened the Dutch spice trade on the Moluccas. The next year he was head of the Public Works in Batavia.

=== Dutch Cape Colony ===
In 1662 he went to Cape of Good Hope with his small family, five slaves and two horses. He followed Jan van Riebeeck as a governor on 6 May. Riebeeck left the next day. In December 1663 he asked Batavia to send him some pottery from Persia. He negotiated with the Hottentots about cattle for the Company. By abstaining from further expeditions Wagener could pursue his policy to refrain from an interference in tribal disputes, and to keep strictly neutral. After five years studying, the German student Georg Friedrich Wreede wrote a compendium of the Dutch and Hottentot language. Wagener appointed him in Mauritius.

Wagener was one of the five people laying the foundation of the Castle of Good Hope, which was started in August 1665. He constructed a waterbasin, supplying the ships with fresh water, a hospital, a school and a church. In 1666 his wife Anna Auxbrebis, whom he had married in 1648, died.

=== Later life ===
On 27 September 1666 he resigned and Wagener went back to Batavia with his stepdaughter. He sold his slaves from Bengal. With presents he went to see the susuhunan of Mataram, who refused to trade with the VOC. He embarked on this expedition with a limited knowledge of the Malay or the Javanese language, and the result of the mission turned out to be fruitless. Nevertheless, Wagener visited Japara afterwards. The year after he sailed back to Amsterdam as a vice-admiral, and in ill health. He was buried on 16 October 1668 in the Old Church.

An excerpt of his diary was translated from the High Dutch into English and published in 1704 and 1732. A manuscript with fundamentally the same excerpt—but in German—has been a part of the Collection of Prints, Drawings and Photographs (German: Kupferstich-Kabinett) of the Dresden State Art Collections since at least the beginning of the 18th century. (Note: The manuscript text is reproduced in.)

=== Terms as opperhoofd ===
Wagner served two terms as opperhoofd in alternation with Joan Boucheljon:

- Joan Bouchelion: 23 October 1655 – 1 November 1656
- Zacharias Wagenaer [Wagener]: 1 November 1656 – 27 October 1657
- Joan Bouchelion: 27 October 1657 – 23 October 1658
- Zacharias Wagenaer [Wagener]: 22 October 1658 – 4 November 1659
- Joan Bouchelion: 4 November 1659 – 26 October 1660

== Work ==
- Wagenern, Zacharias (c. 1641). Thier Buch (in German). Unter hochlöblicher Regierung des hochgebornen Herren Johand Moritz Graffen von Nassau, Gubernator Capitain, und Admiral General – via Kupferstich-Kabinett.

== Gallery ==
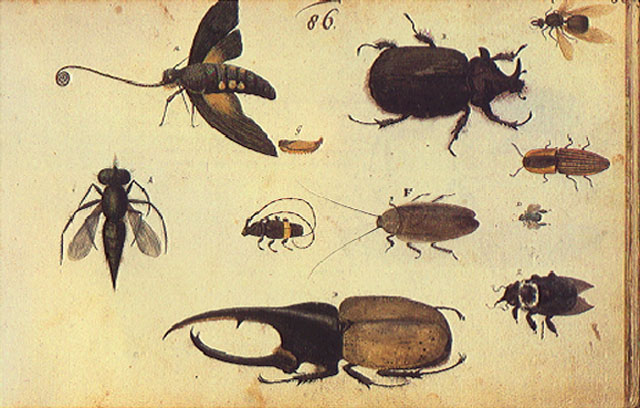
Insects, Kupferstich-Kabinett (Dresden)

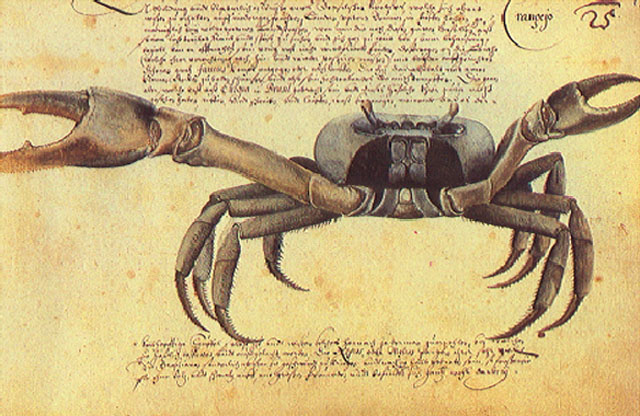
Caranguejo (crab)
