= Hortus Malabaricus =

17th-century botanical treatise

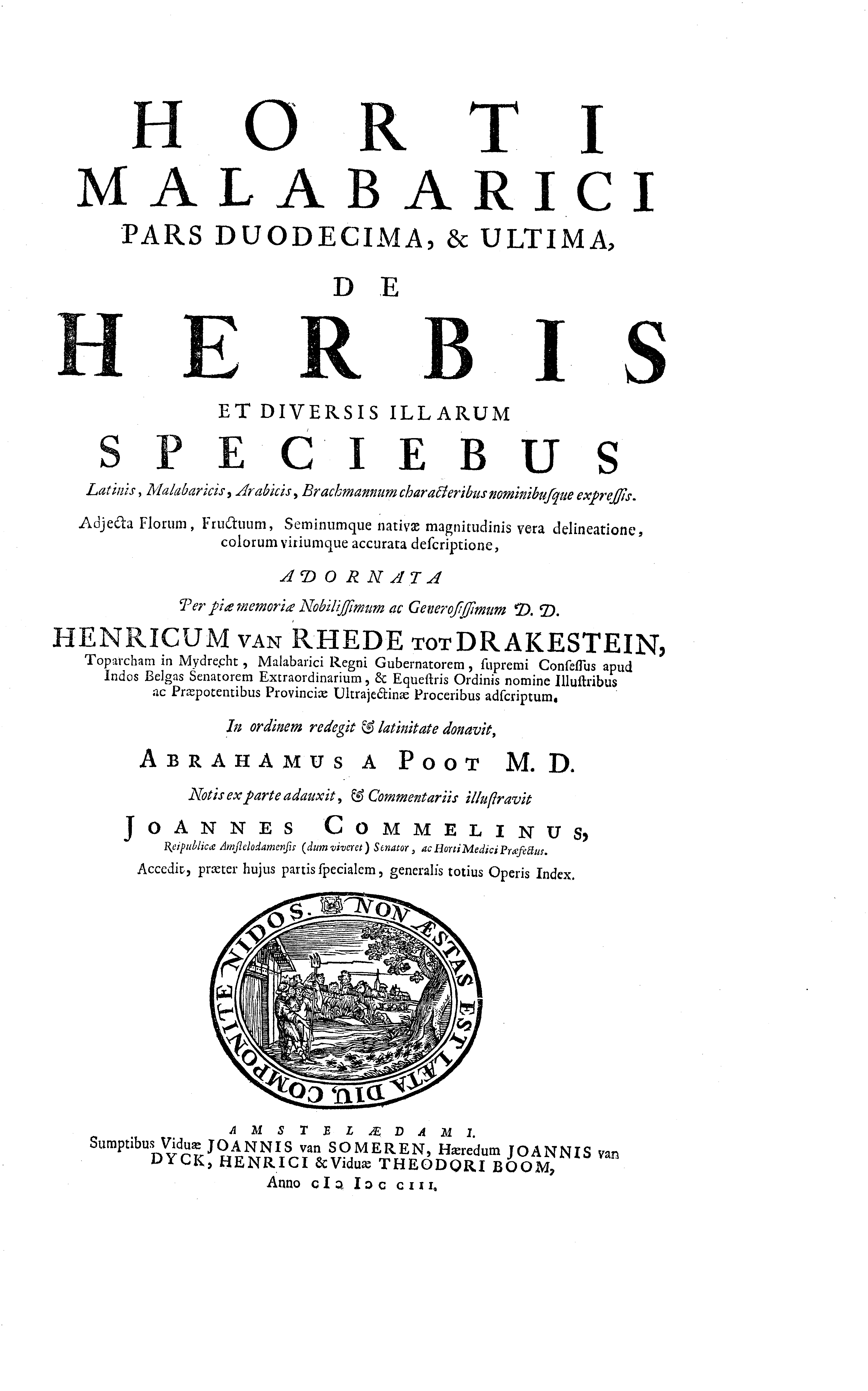
- Title page of the original Latin edition of Hortus Malabaricus, vol. 12
- Author: Hendrik van Rheede, Itty Achudan
- Publication date: 1678–1703

Hortus Malabaricus (transl. The Garden of Malabar) is a 17th-century Latin botanical treatise documenting the varieties and medicinal properties of the flora of the Malabar coast.

This treatise was based on earlier documentation by Itty Achudan, a distinguished herbalist among the traditional Ezhava physicians of Kerala, was Van Rheede's key who disclosed the traditional Ayurvedic knowledge about the plants of Malabar to him. It was compiled in 12 volumes by Hendrik van Rheede, the Governor of Dutch Malabar from 1669 to 1676.

Hortus Malabaricus was published posthumously in Amsterdam between 1678 and 1693. English and Malayalam translations of Hortus Malabaricus were published by University of Kerala in 2003 and 2008, respectively, which was largely due to the efforts of Professor K. S. Manilal, an Emeritus of the University of Calicut (since he didn’t know Latin he received the help of Catholic priests and bishops who were experts in Latin), who devoted over 35 years of his life to research for the translation and annotation work of the original text of Hortus Malabaricus in Latin.

== History and significance ==
Richard H. Grove, in his book Green Imperialism: Colonial Expansion, Tropical Island Edens and the Origins, states that Itty Achudan and his team selected the plants which were to be drawn and included in Hortus Malabaricus, with accurate identification and mentioning of vernacular name of the plants. Itty Achuthan also disclosed the medicinal and other uses of the plants which was known to him from his own experience as a herbal physician and from palm-leaf manuscripts carried by his family as. Achudan dictated the material, in his native Malayalam language, which was then translated into Latin. Hortus Malabaricus was compiled over a period of nearly 30 years and published in Amsterdam during 1678–1703. The book was conceived by Hendrik van Rheede, who was the Governor of Dutch Malabar at the time. In the research paper published in the journal Global Histories, titled 'Plants, Power and Knowledge: An Exploration of the Imperial Networks and the Circuits of Botanical Knowledge and Medical Systems on the Western Coast of India Against the Backdrop of European Expansionism', Malavika Binny states that Kerala had medical traditions that existed even prior to Ayurvedic tradition. As per the author, Ezhava Tradition of Healing Practices or 'Ezhava vaidyam', as it is called, was prominent among other medical traditions that existed in Kerala which involved a considerable contribution from Buddhism which was a major force from the sixth century to about the eleventh century. This Buddhist tradition of treatment of diseases using plants and the knowledge of the indigenous plants preserved by the Ezhavas was exploited by the European endeavour as suggested by the inclusion of Itty Achuden in the compilation of Hortus Malabaricus which is basically an ethno-botanical treatise on the flora of Malabar.

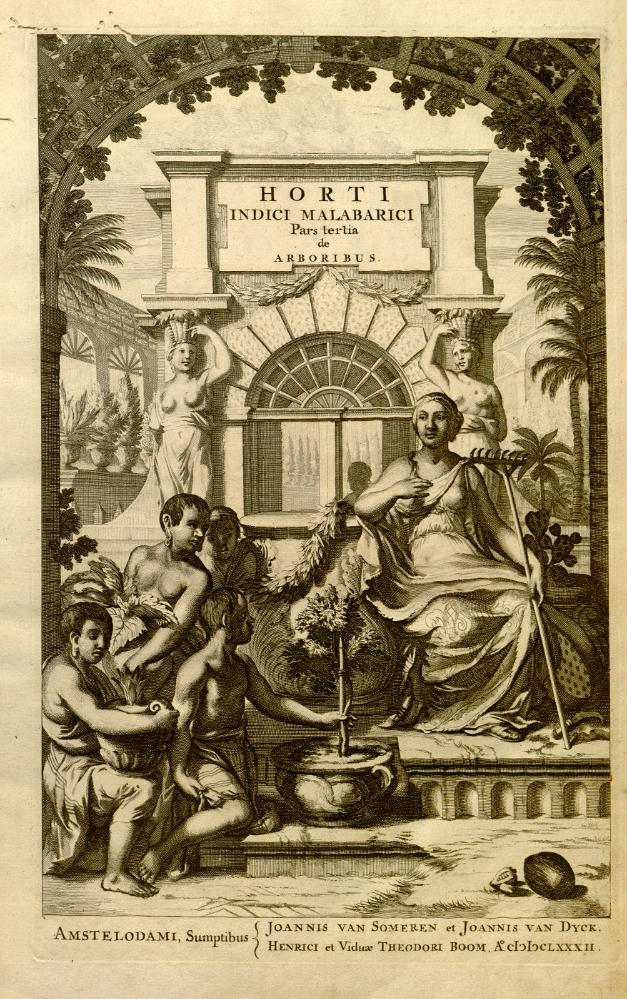
Frontispiece of volume 3

== About ==
The Hortus Malabaricus comprises 12 volumes of about 500 pages each, with 794 copper plate engravings. The first of the 12 volumes of the book was published in 1678, and the last in 1703. It is believed to be one of the earliest printed works on the flora of Asia and the tropics, after Garcia de Orta's "Colóquios dos simples e drogas he cousas medicinais da Índia" (Goa, 1563) and the most comprehensive among them.

Mentioned in these volumes are plants of the Malabar Coast which in his time referred to the stretch along the Western Ghats from Goa to Kanyakumari. The book gives a detailed account of the flora of Malabar district, along with sketches and detailed descriptions. Over 742 different plants and their indigenous science are considered in the book. The book also employs a system of classification based on the traditions adopted by the practitioners of that region. Apart from Latin, the plant names have been recorded in other languages including Malayalam, Konkani, Arabic, English. The comprehensive nature of the book is noted by T. Whitehouse in his 1859 Historical Notices of Cochin on the Malabar Coast:

All the country around was diligently searched by the natives best acquainted with the habitats of plants; and fresh specimens were brought to Cochin where the Carmelite Mathaeus sketched them, with such striking accuracy, that there was no difficulty in identifying each particular species when you see his drawings. Names of each species is written in Malayalam as well as Konkani (Then known as Brahmananchi Bhas) A description of each plant was written in Malayalam and thence translated into Portuguese, by a resident at Cochin, named Emmanuel Carneiro. The Secretary to Government, Herman Van Douep, further translated it into Latin, that the learned in all the countries of Europe might have access to it. The whole seems then to have passed under the supervision of another learned individual named Casearius, who was probably a Dutch Chaplain and a personal friend of Van Rheede. A book of its size, on which such care was expended, must have consumed a fortune before its publication, and confers honour, both on those who compiled it and the place where it was compiled.

Several species of plants have their type illustrations in this work.

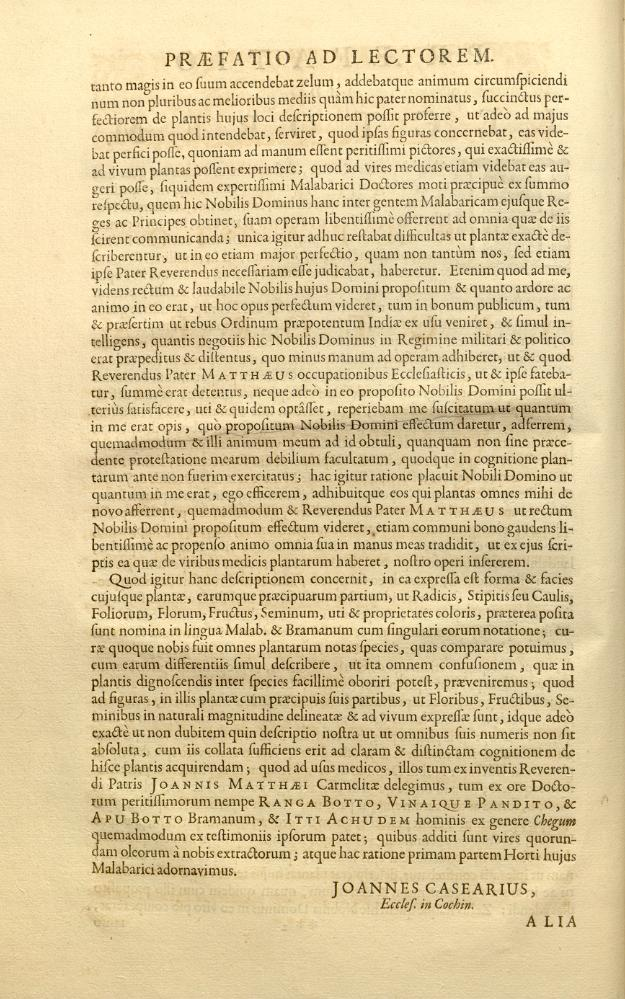
A Preface page, in which names of Carmelite Father Joannis Matthaei, the Brahmin physicians Ranga Bhat, Vinayaka Pandit, and Appu Bhat and the Ayurveda vaidya (Ayurveda practitioner) Itti Achuden are mentioned.

== Contributors ==
Hendrik van Rheede was said to have taken a keen personal interest in the compilation of the Hortus Malabaricus. The work was edited by a team of nearly a hundred including:

- Co-author the Discalced Carmelite Mathaeus of St. Joseph (buried at Varapuzha Basilica Church) at Verapoly, Ernakulam.
- The physician Itti Achuden and the Brahmins Ranga Bhat, Vinayaka pandit and Appu Bhat.
- Professors of medicine and botany
- Amateur botanists, such as Arnold Seyn, Theodore Jansson of Almeloveen, Paul Hermann, Johannes Munnicks, Joannes Commelinus, Abraham a Poot.
- Technicians, illustrators and engravers, together with the collaboration of Dutch East India Company officials, and clergymen including D. John Caesarius.

The ethno-medical information presented in Hortus Malabaricus was culled from palm leaf manuscripts by Itty Achuden, who dictated the material in Malayalam, which was then scrutinized by three Konkani Brahmanas—gymnosophist priest-physicians (referred to in the text as ‘brahmins’) Ranga Bhat,— Vinayaka Pandit and Appu Bhat, followed by a process of thorough verification, discussion with other scholars and general agreement.

Volume 1 of the Hortus Malabaricus contains a testimony by Achudan, dated 20 April 1675, which can be translated as follows: "As intended by the hereditary Malayalam physician born in Kollatt house in Kodakarapalli village of Karappuram and residing therein. Having come to Cochin fort on the orders of Coomodore Van Rheede and having examined the trees and seed varieties described in this book, the descriptions of and the treatment with each of them known from our books and classified as in the illustrations and notes and explained in detail to Emmanuel Carnerio, the interpreter of the Honourable Company, clearing doubts thus supplied the information as accepted without any doubt by this gentlemen of Malabar".

Many of the descriptions that accompany each plant in Hortus Malabaricus thus remains as cultural storehouse of the incidental sociological situation and social affinities carried by the flora of those times. This was one among the true contributions of Itty Achthan to knowledge base created and contained by Hortus Malabaricus. It is also important to note that at University of Leiden, Arnold Syen and Jan Commelin tried to follow the order and classification of the plants as prescribed by Itty Achuthan and his fellow Ezhava physicians, though Europe had its own standard system of classification of plants.

Van Rheede was also assisted by the King of Cochin and the ruling Zamorin of Calicut. Professor K. S. Manilal (b. 1938) has worked over 35 years on the research, translations, and annotations of the Hortus Malabaricus. The effort has brought the main contents of the book to Malayalam and English-speaking scholars. It had largely remained inaccessible previously to them, because of the entire text being untranslated into the English language and Malayalam language. The early Makhdoom scholars of Ponnani also made their own contributions to Hortus Malabaricus. Sheikh Zainuddin I, along with other Muslim scholars, provided the Dutch with the names of plants in both Arabic and Malayalam.

== See also ==
- Flora of Kerala
- Medicinal plant
- Geography of Kerala
- History of Kerala
