= Itty Achudan =

Ayurvedic physician of the 17th century

- Born: 1640; Cherthala, Venad (modern-day Kerala, India)
- Died: Cochin, Kingdom of Cochin (modern-day Kerala, India)
- Occupations: Ayurvedic physician, Botanical expert, incumbent "Kollat Vaidyan" during the period 1670–1700

Itty Achudan (forename also spelt as Itty Achuden in English, and Itti Achudem in Latin), was an Indian Herbalist, Botanist and Physician. He belonged to an Ezhava family in Kerala who practised pre-Ayurvedic systems of traditional medicine. The Kollatt family are natives of Kadakkarappally, a coastal village, north-west of Cherthala town, in Kerala, India. Itty Achudan was the most remarkable Indian figure associated with Hortus Malabaricus, the botanical treatise on the medicinal properties of flora in Malabar (present day Kerala), in the 17th-century. It was compiled by the Dutch Governor of Malabar, Hendrik van Rheede, and Itty Achudan was Van Rheede's key informant who disclosed the pre-Ayurvedic traditional knowledge about the plants of Malabar to him. Hortus Malabaricus was published posthumously in Amsterdam between 1678 and 1693. The preface to Hortus Malabaricus includes a mentioning about Itty Achudan and a testimony revealing his contribution in his own hand writing. Itty Achudan was introduced to Van Rheede by Veera Kerala Varma, the then ruler of the erstwhile state of Kochi.

== Contributions to Hortus Malabaricus ==
In the article 'On the English edition of Van Rheede's Hortus Malabaricus by K. S. Manilal' published in Current Science (November, 2005, Vol. 89, No. 10), H.Y.Mohan Ram states that the ethno-medical information presented in Hortus Malabaricus, was culled from palm leaf manuscripts by Itty Achudan, who dictated the material in Malayalam, which was then scrutinized by three Konkani Brahmanas—gymnosophist priest-physicians (referred to in the text as ‘brahmins’) Ranga Bhat, Vinayaka Pandit and Appu Bhat, followed by a process of thorough verification, discussion with other scholars and general agreement.

Volume 1 of the Hortus Malabaricus contains a testimony by Itty Achudan, dated 20 April 1675, which can be translated as follows: "As intended by the hereditary Malayalam physician born in Kollatt house in Codacarappalli village of Carrapurram and residing therein. Having come to Cochin fort on the orders of Commodore Van Rheede and having examined the trees and seed varieties described in this book, the descriptions of and the treatment with each of them known from our books and classified as in the illustrations and notes and explained in detail to Emmanuel Carnerio, the interpreter of the Honourable Company, clearing doubts thus supplied the information as accepted without any doubt by this gentlemen of Malabar".

In the same volume, Emmanuel Carnerio, in his testimony dated 20 April 1675, states that: "As intended by Emmanuel Carneiro, the interpreter of the Honourable Company, born, married and residing at Cochin. According to the Command of Commodore Henrik Van Rheede, the trees, shrubs, twines and herbs and their flowers, fruits, seeds, juices and roots and their powers and properties described in the famed book of the Malayalee physician born at Carrapurram, of the Chekava caste and of the name Colladan, have been dictated separately in Portuguese language and Malayalam language. Thus, for writing this truthfully, without any doubt, my signature".

Richard H. Grove, in his book 'Green Imperialism: Colonial Expansion, Tropical Island Edens and the Origins', states that Itty Achudan and his team selected the plants which were to be drawn and included in Hortus Malabaricus, with accurate identification and mentioning of vernacular (local) name of the plants. Itty Achudan also disclosed the medicinal and other uses of the plants which was known to him from his own experience as a herbal physician and from the 'palmleaf scripture' carried by his family as 'wealth of knowledge'. Achudan dictated the material, in his native Malayalam language, which was then translated into Latin. Itty Achudan used the "Kolezhuthu" Malayalam script to write his declaration in the Hortus Malabaricus.

Many of the descriptions that accompany each plant in Hortus Malabaricus thus remains as cultural storehouse of the incidental sociological situation and social affinities carried by the flora of those times. This was one among the true contributions of Itty Achudan to knowledge base created and contained by Hortus Malabaricus. It is also important to note that at University of Leiden, Arnold Syen and Jan Commelin tried to follow the order and classification of the plants as prescribed by Itty Achudan and his fellow physicians, though Europe had its own standard system of classification of plants.

== The Buddhist Healing Tradition ==
In the research paper published in the journal Global Histories, entitled 'Plants, Power and Knowledge: An Exploration of the Imperial Networks and the Circuits of Botanical Knowledge and Medical Systems on the Western Coast of India Against the Backdrop of European Expansionism', Malavika Binny states that Kerala had medical traditions that existed even prior to Ayurvedic tradition. As per the author, Tradition of Healing Practices or 'Vaidyam', as it is called, was prominent among other medical traditions that existed in Kerala which involved a considerable contribution from Buddhism which was a major force from the sixth century to about the eleventh century. This Buddhist tradition of treatment of diseases using plants and the knowledge of the indigenous plants preserved by the natives was exploited by the European endeavour as suggested by the inclusion of Itty Achudan in the compilation of Hortus Malabaricus which is basically an ethno-botanical treatise on the flora of Malabar.

== Research on Itty Achudan’s life ==
Listing of the name of Itty Achudan, Doctor, of Chekava origin under the Asia Section of the 1716 Historical Directory of Natural History Studies of Swiss Prodomus - Bibliotheca Scriptorum Historiae Naturali omnium Terrae Regionum inservientum Historiae naturalis Helvetiae Prodomus

Calicut University botany taxonomist Professor K. S. Manilal, of Kozhikode, devoted over 35 years to research, translation and annotation of the Latin Hortus Malabaricus. This revealed a wealth of botanical information on Malabar that had remained largely inaccessible to English-speaking scholars. Manilal's work is also of historic and socio-cultural importance, as it brought insights into the life and times of Itty Achudan and the 17th century Malabar, information concerning the former being previously known only to the Kollat family.

In 1996, Manilal also authored a separate book in the Malayalam language; the title which translates as A Study on the Role of Itty Achuden in the Compilation of Hortus Malabaricus. This book was the result of specific additional research undertaken with the objective of collecting factual evidence and clarifying various misconceptions, about the original Hortus Malabaricus. However, a book which can be raised to the status of an exclusive biography of Itty Achudan and his contributions to Hortus Malabaricus was done by A.N. Chidambaran, which was published by Kerala Sahithya Akademy. An updated documentation of all the available information on Itty Achudan can be had from 'Horthoos Malabarikoos Charithravum Sasthravum' authored by N. S. Arunkumar.

== Memorial ==
Itty Achudan's Vilakku Maadam (lamp house) at the Kollatt house

Although none of the Kollatt family members today practise ayurvedic medicine, the family house at Kadakkarapally still has an ancient vilakku-maadam (lamp house) or ‘kuriala’, maintained, over the centuries in honour of Itty Achudan. The family home also has remains of a botanical garden, 'kaavu', which includes ancient trees and medicinal plants. In 2014 October, the Kerala State Department of Archeology declared the ‘kuriala’ and the botanical garden as protected monuments. The wooden pen, 'narayam', used by Achudan, the cane-basket that once held the palm-leaf scripture and the silk and bangle received by Achudan, gifted by the erstwhile King of Cochin were also declared to be protected as per the preliminary gazette published in July 2013, which was later modified regarding the area of the land.

== Recognition ==
During the 19th century, Carl Ludwig Blume, a renowned botanist, decided that Achudan should be honoured and thus named a genus in his honour, Achudemia, which is now been included under Pilea (Urticaceae).

The Kollat family members have set up a socio-charitable trust in honour of Itty Achudan. In Jawaharlal Nehru Tropical Botanic Garden and Research Institute (JNTBGRI), Palode in Thiruvananthapuram district, as per a declaration from the Government of Kerala, a herbal garden in the name of Itty Achudan was established. A portion of the JNTBGRI Garden was set aside to introduce plants listed in Hortus Malabaricus. Several architectural features are also incorporated in the garden, which include ‘Kottyambalam’ style entrance, 'Kalvilakku', 'Thulasithara' and a boundary wall made of clay adorned with wall lamps. A similar attempt to develop a botanical garden dedicated to Itty Achudan was also made by Malabar Botanical Garden and Institute for Plant Sciences, in Kozhikode, Kerala.
