= Dutch Malabar =

Commandment of the Dutch East India Company

Dutch Malabar Commandement van Malabar, Cannara en Wingurla
- 1661–1795
- Flag Coat of arms

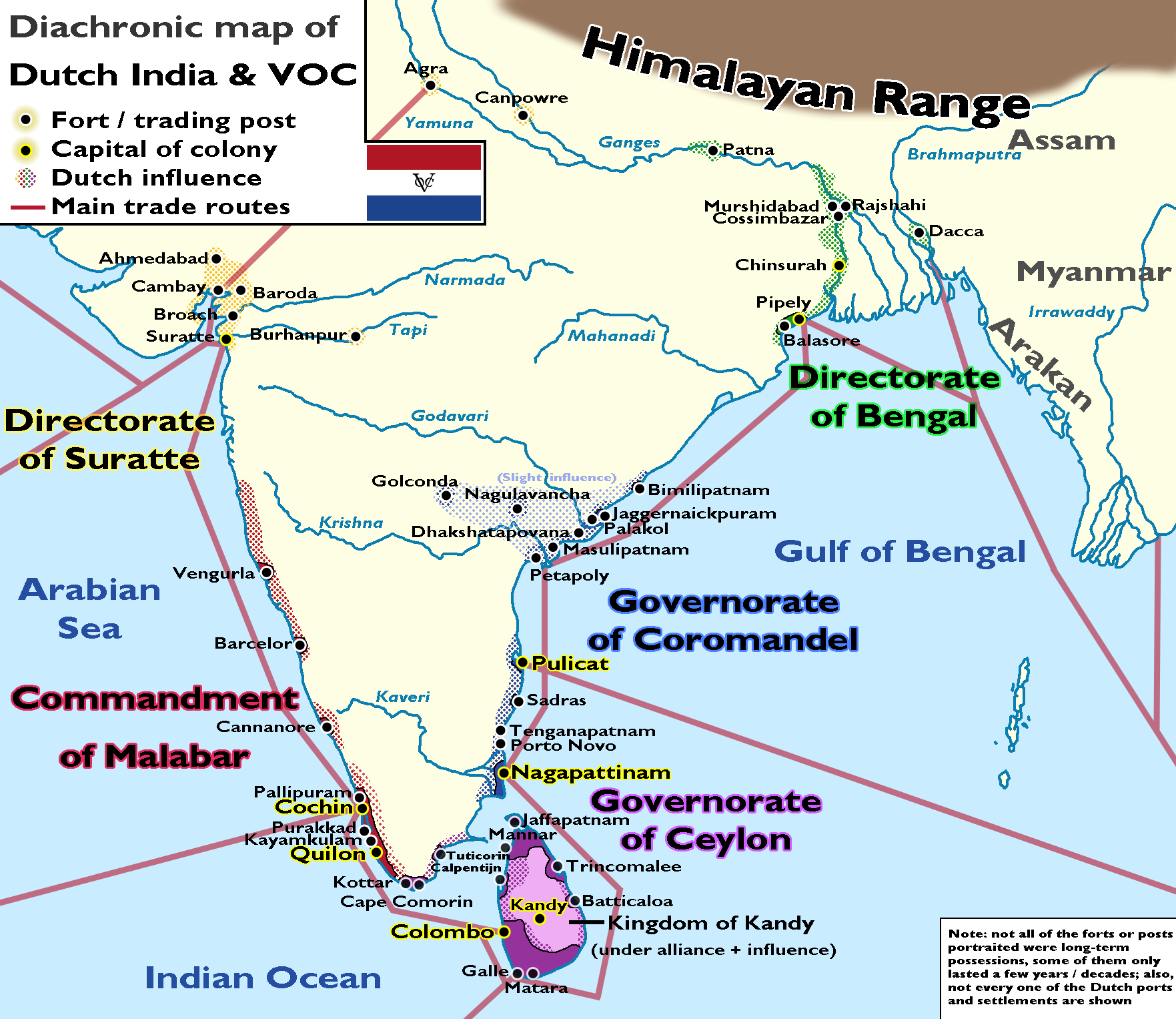
- Dutch Malabar (in red) within Dutch India
- Status: Factory
- Capital: Dutch Quilon (1661–1663); Fort Cochin (1663–1795)
- Common languages: Dutch, Malayalam
- Commander
  - 1663–1665: Ludolph van Coulster
  - 1669–1676: Hendrik van Rheede
  - 1793–1795: Jan Lambertus van Spall
- Historical era: Imperialism
  - Dutch capture of Portuguese Quilon: December 1661
  - British annexation of Malabar: 1795
Preceded by	Succeeded by
Portuguese India	British India; Travancore

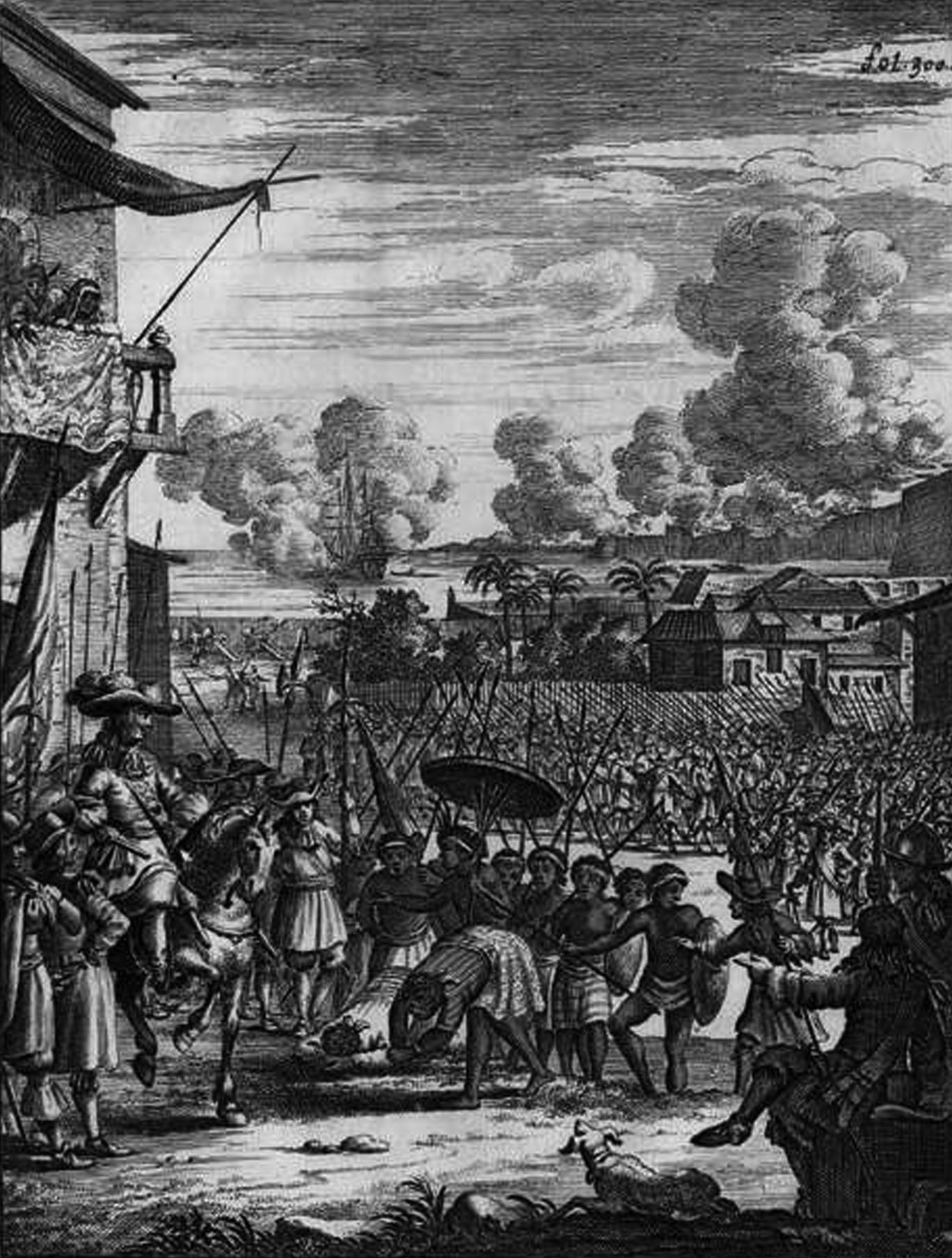
Quilon rulers submit to the Dutch.

Dutch Malabar (Dutch: Malabar, Cannara en Wingurla; Malayalam: ഡച്ച് മലബാർ) also known by the name of its main settlement Cochin, were a collection of settlements and trading factories of the Dutch East India Company on the Malabar Coast between 1661 and 1795, and was a subdivision of what was collectively referred to as Dutch India. Dutch presence in the Malabar region started with the capture of Portuguese Quilon, expanded with the Conquest of Malabar (1658–1663), and ended with the conquest of Malabar by the British in 1795. They possessed military outposts in 11 locations: Alleppey, Ayacotta, Chendamangalam, Pappinivattom, Ponnani, Pallipuram, Cranganore (from 15 January 1662), Chetwai, Cannanore (from 15 February 1663), Cochin (7 January 1663 – 1795), and Quilon (29 December 1658 – 14 April 1659 and from 24 December 1661 – 1795).

The Kingdom of Cochin was an ally of the Dutch East India Company. The Dutch enlarged the Royal Palace built by the Portuguese at Mattancheri for the King of Cochin, which from then on became known as the "Dutch Palace". In 1744, an impressive palace later called Bolgatty Palace, was erected on Bolghatty Island for the Dutch Governors.

The Dutch contributed a monumental work called Hortus Indicus Malabaricus on the medicinal properties of Malabar plants. In Cochin, the Dutch established an orphanage for poor European children and a leper asylum on Vypin.

== History ==
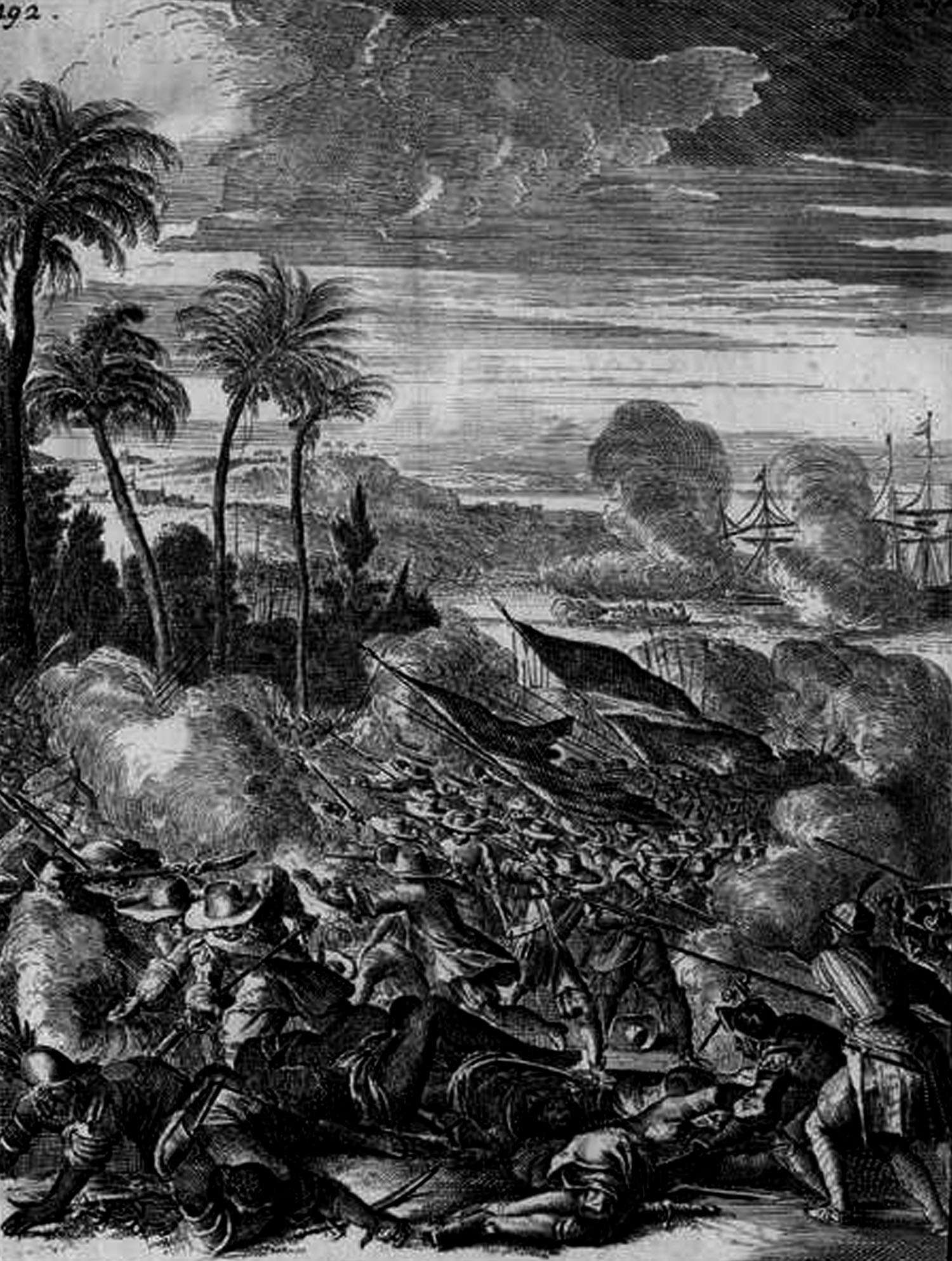
The battle between the Dutch and the Portuguese in December 1661.

=== Beginning ===
The Portuguese had arrived in Malabar in 1505, establishing their dominance over Far Eastern trade and frequently intervening in the internal affairs of the native princes of the region. Seeing the massive amounts of wealth generated by the Portuguese in India other European powers, including the Dutch, wanted to usurp the Portuguese from their privileged position. A challenge to Portuguese domination was signaled by the arrival of the Dutch with the 1595-1597 expedition of Cornelius de Houtman to the East. This changed the political situation in the region, as the native princes on the coast now saw an opportunity for an alliance to expel the Portuguese. However Dutch involvement in the politics of Malabar began with the landing of Admiral Steven Van der Hagen in Malabar in 1604. During his visit, he signed a treaty with the Zamorin of Calicut, which allowed the Dutch East India Company to trade in Calicut and build a fort. In exchange the Dutch were to assist the Zamorin in expelling the Portuguese from Malabar. However the region was mostly ignored by the Dutch, who were more focused on the conquest of Java and the islands of Indonesia. However they did occasionally visit and kept good relations with the princes on the coast. However, with the conquest of Ceylon in 1640 the Dutch now had a secure base from which they could focus on expelling the Portuguese. An initial attack in 1658 under Admiral Ryklof Van Goens resulted in the capture of Quilon in December. However a joint attack by the Portuguese and the Rani of Quilon resulted in the garrison withdrawing in 1659. The Dutch later allied themselves with the Zamorin in 1661, capturing and handing over the fort of Pallipuram in the same year. An further opportunity came in 1658, when a succession crisis in the Kingdom of Cochin saw the pro Portuguese candidate become King. One of the claimants to the throne, Vira Kerala Varma, with the support of the Chief of Paliyam who was the Prime Minister of Cochin, came to the Dutch in Colombo and requested their help in expelling the Portuguese. The Dutch accepted and allied with the Chief and the Rajas of Thekkumkur and Vadakkamkur attacked the Portuguese settlements in Malabar. An expedition, under Admiral Van Goens arrived in Quilon, capturing the city on the 8th of December 1661. The only resistance they met was from the Nairs of the Rani of Quilon. Van Goens then sailed to Cranganore and, despite heavy Portuguese resistance, took the fort. It was then given to the Zamorin in accordance with the terms of their alliance. After the fall of Cranganore the island of Vypin was ceded to the Dutch by the Chief of Paliyam.

=== Alliance with Cochin ===
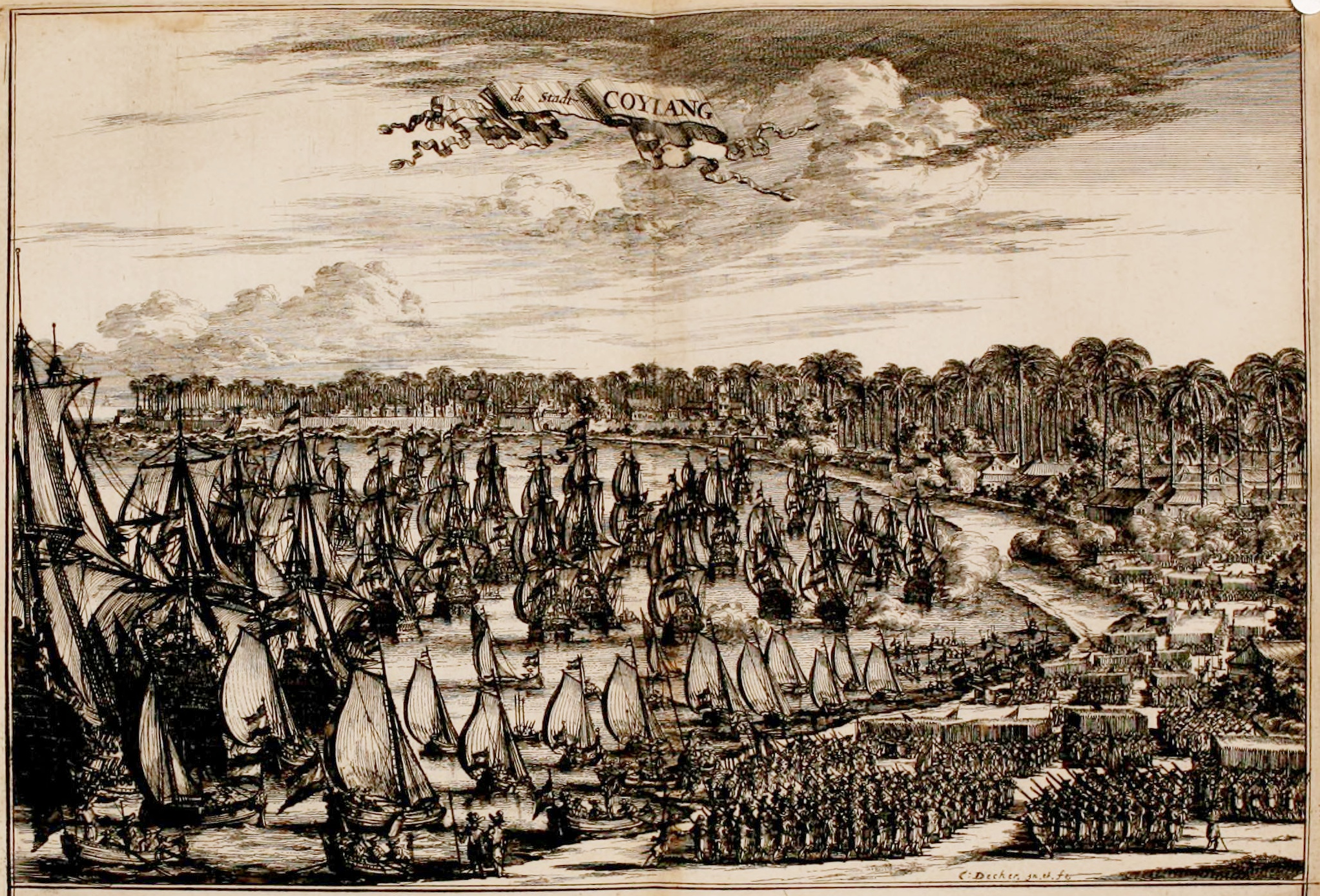
Capture of Quilon in 1661.

The Dutch and their allies then moved towards Cochin and marched upon the palace of the Royal Palace on the 5 February 1662. The Portuguese puppet ruler, Rani Gangadhara Lakshmi was captured and handed over to the Zamorin. After this the Dutch turned their attention to the Portuguese fort. Their first attempt to besiege it had been unsuccessful due to a joint attack by a fleet from Goa and the Raja of Procaud. However, on their second attempt they defeated the Raja and, with no hope of reinforcement, the Portuguese garrison finally capitulated on the 6th January 1663. The terms of the capitulation were that all the unmarried Portuguese residents were returned to Europe, and all married Portuguese and Mestiços were transferred to Goa. The forts of Cochin, Cannore and Quilon were to be handed over to the Dutch.

=== Battles for supremacy on Malabar ===
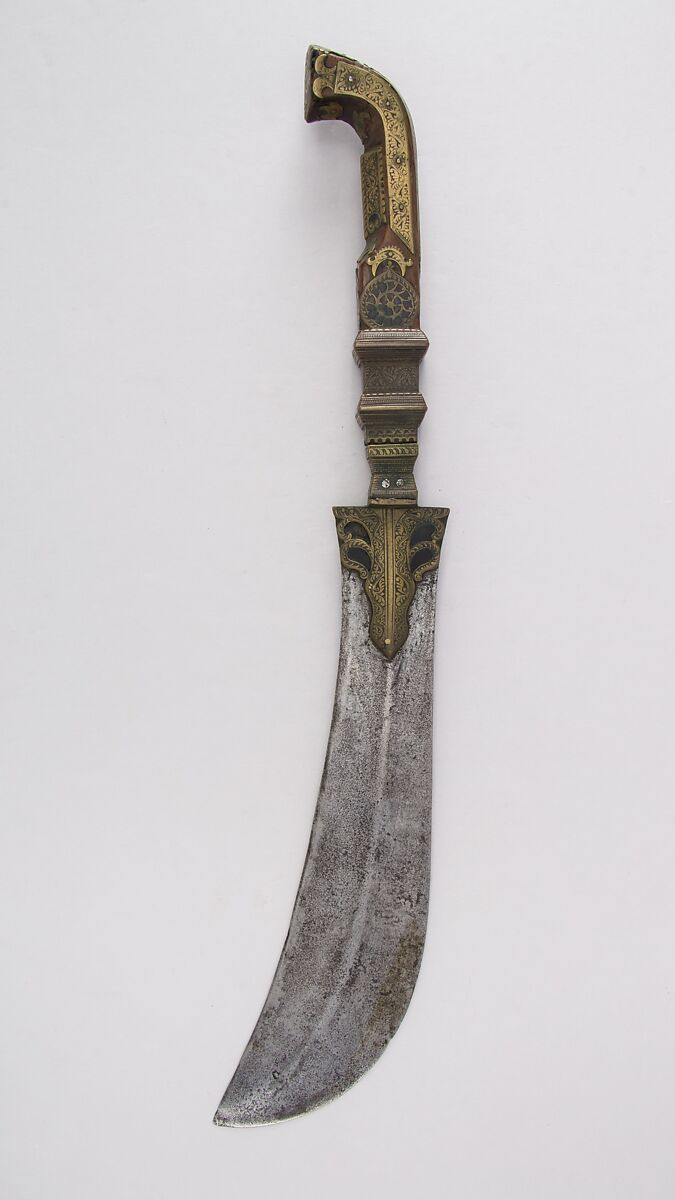
Malabari Muslim Sword

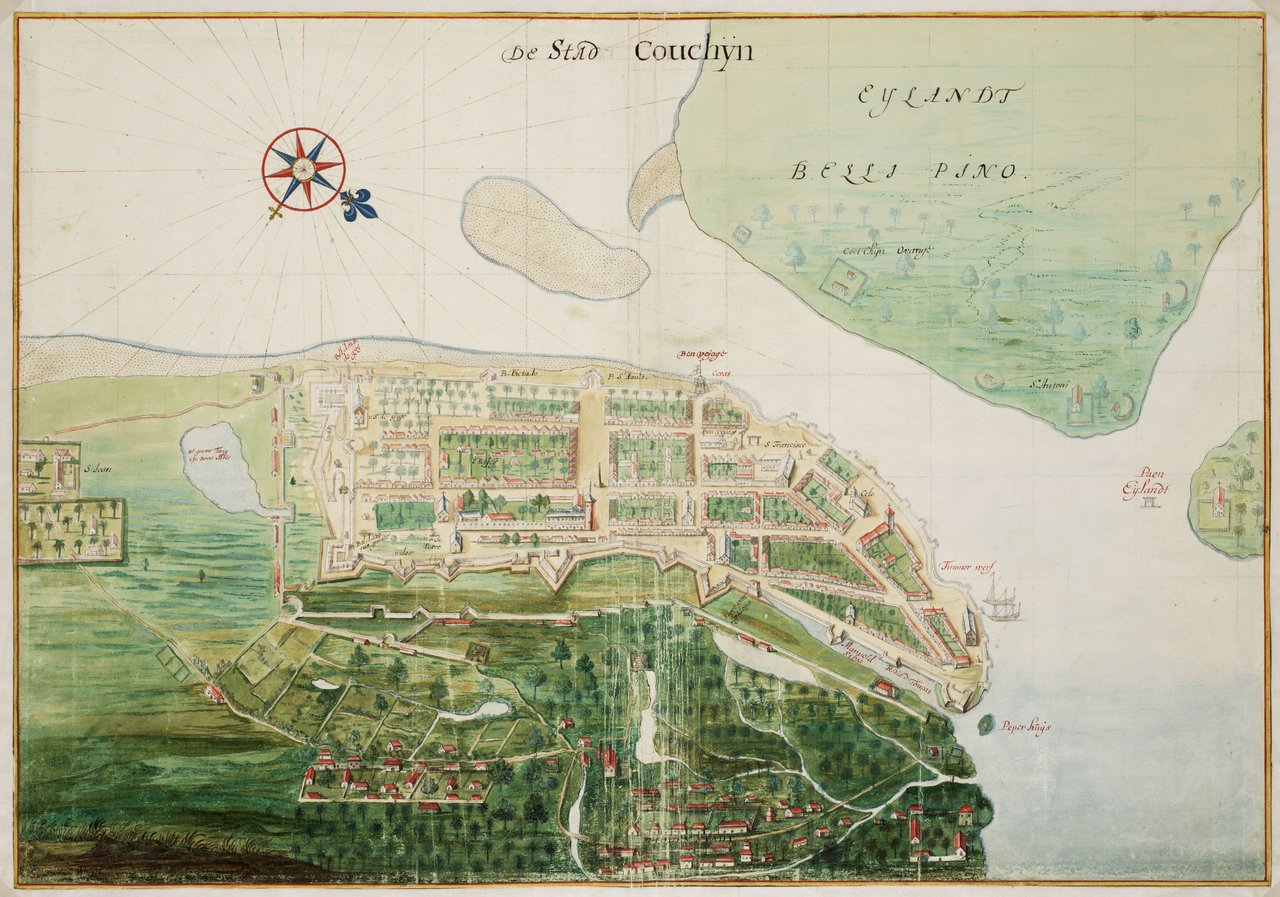
Kochi City around 1665.

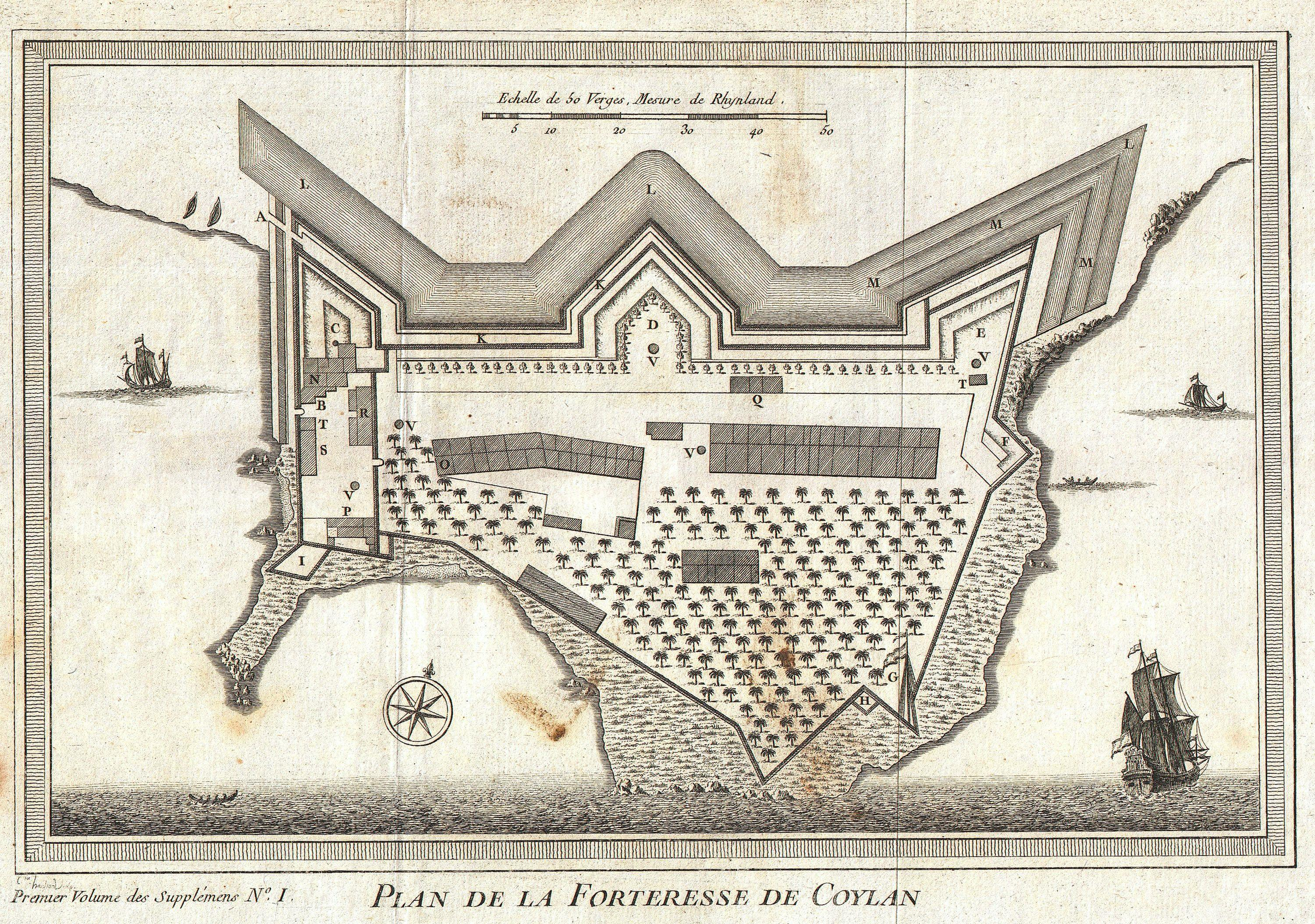
Quilon in 1756.

Before the conquest of Cochin Van Goens had signed a treaty with the Zamorin which promised the Dutch the exclusive right to purchase pepper in Calicut territory at market price in exchange for the island of Vypin. He later demanded the vassalisation of Cochin. However the Dutch, having established themselves in Cochin, rejected these demands.

The Dutch signed a treaty in 1662 with the Raja of Travancore which gave them a monopoly over the pepper trade alongside the right to protect the Christians of Travancore. In exchange the Dutch would send the Raja 15,000 fanams per year alongside a number of guns. However, as the goal of the VOC was a complete monopoly of the pepper trade on the Malabar coast they needed to make agreements with all the Chiefs of the region. To this end they asked the Factor of Quilon, Captain Nieuhoff, to negotiate with all the rulers on the coast. This he did, making treaties with the rulers of Kayamkulam, Purakkad, Madathumkur, Travancore and Quilon.

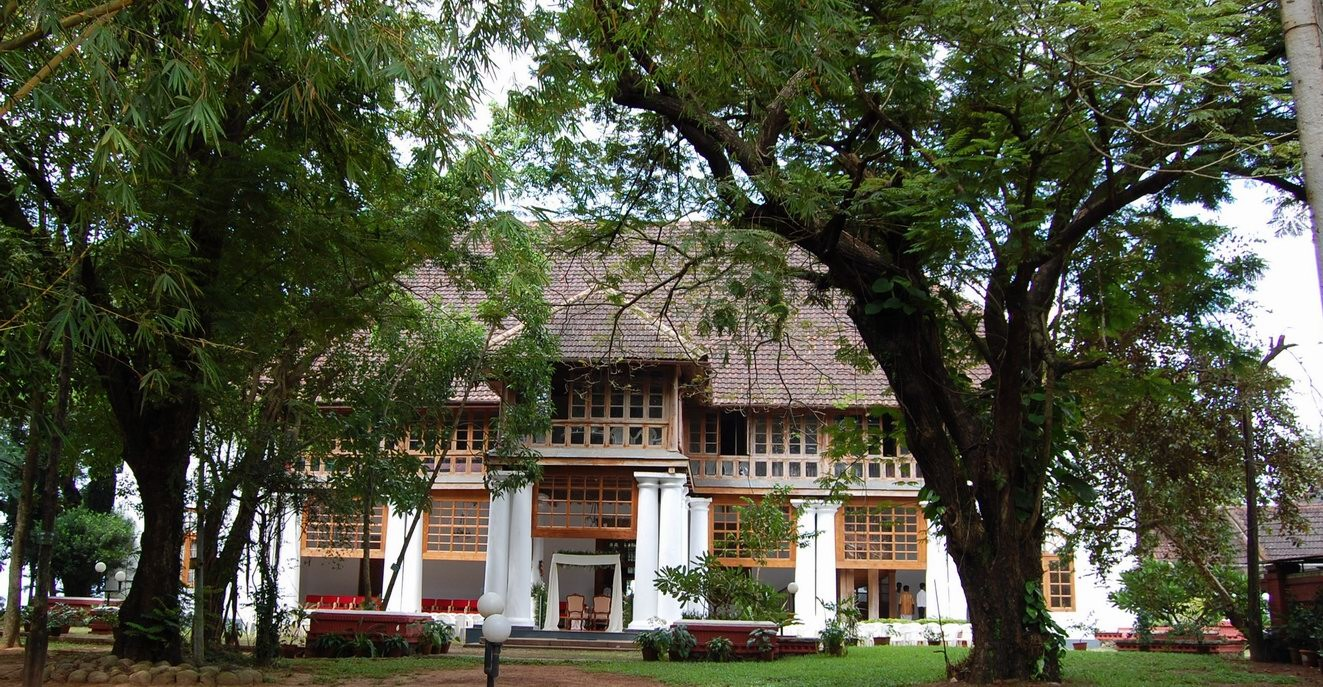
The Bolgatty Palace, built in 1744 for the commander of Dutch Malabar, is one of the oldest existing Dutch palaces outside of the Netherlands.

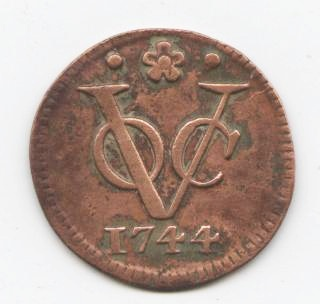
Coin of the Dutch East India Company, 1744

In 1669, Dutch Malabar became a separate commandment of the Dutch East India Company (VOC); beforehand it had been governed from Batavia. In 1670, the Zamorin of Calicut ruler was persuaded by his prince to go to Cranganore to encourage the Nairs. But, the Dutch made a surprise attack on the Zamorin's camp. Thirty Dutch lost their lives this raid, and in the confusion of the battle, the Royal Sword of Calicut was destroyed. The Calicut ruler fell back to Papinivattom, and the prince attacked the bastion and captured it. In 1673, VOC representative Hendrik van Rheede came to Cochin as its Commander. He re-occupied the bastion and demanded the cession of Chetwai - the route to Cochin from Calicut. He came to Port Ponani in 1678 and met with the Calicut ruler. Tired of the hostility shown by most of the natives, the Dutch opened negotiations with Calicut. The Commissary General of Batavia, the head of the Dutch Government in the East Indies, came to Ponani in 1696 without even stopping at Cochin. In the meantime, Calicut formed a large anti-Dutch alliance and signed a new treaty with the English. In the following years, they made raids deep into Cochin areas (1701–1710). The Dutch supported their ally Cochin and began to construct a fort for the security of Chetwai. Soon, Calicut sent a force to pull down the fortifications and expelled the Dutch from Chetwai (1714). The Chief of the English factory had a great hand in promoting this. Calicut resolved to follow up on this success by attacking Cranganore and Pappinivattom. But, the Dutch under Councillor William Bucker Jacobs retaliated by defeating the Calicut and English armies and on 10 April 1719 the Dutch formally took command of Fort William, as the fort at Chetwai was called then. This Cochin-Dutch victory was a heavy blow to the English and Robert Adams.

The Dutch gradually began to consider their forts and garrisons in Malabar an economic burden, while the British East India Company dominance of commerce in Malabar increased. On 10 September 1691 the Dutch transferred Chetwai back to Calicut and reduced the size and strength of their forces across Malabar. The fear of Cochin-Dutch alliance began to fade in the minds of Calicut rulers. In 1721, the supreme council of the Dutch East Indies in Batavia agreed that it would no longer support its ally Cochin against Calicut, betraying a century old friendship.

=== Defeat against Travancore and Kew Letters ===
Map of the main forts on the Malabar Coast of India (Vengurla and Barselor not shown)

The Dutch never succeeded in establishing a pepper trade monopoly in Malabar and were all the more frustrated in their attempts when the young ruler of Travancore, Marthanda Varma, started to expand his kingdom. The Travancore–Dutch War that followed culminated in the Battle of Colachel, which proved disastrous for the Dutch. Eustachius De Lannoy, a naval commander in the Dutch army, was taken prisoner and subsequently became a commander in the Travancore army. De Lannoy later helped Travancore to establish an organized army, introduce better firearms and artillery, and to build European style forts in his state.

As a result of the Kew Letters, Dutch settlements on the Malabar Coast were surrendered to the British in 1795, in order to prevent them from being overrun by the French. Dutch Malabar remained British after the conclusion of the Anglo-Dutch Treaty of 1814, which exchanged the colony for Bangka Island.

== Forts and trading posts ==
Settlement	Type	Established	Disestablished	Comments
Fort Cochin	Fort and factory	1663	1795	Established by the Portuguese as their first settlement in India. Captured by the Dutch in 1663, who made it the capital of Dutch Malabar (the residence of the Commander). During the Dutch occupation of Cochin they made several changes in the city. The Dutch reduced the area of the old Portuguese town reduced the fort and destroyed most of the public buildings built by the Portuguese. They developed the harbour, the piers, many merchants’ houses, and warehouses in Cochin.
Fort Cranganore	Fort	1662	1770	Cranganore was a little city with a small fort, but the place was of major strategic importance; it was "the key" to Cochin. Fell under the command of Fort Cochin and meant to protect the latter. In 1662, the formerly Portuguese fort was first given back to the Zamorin of Calicut as a reward for his alliance with the Dutch, but in 1666 the Dutch started to renovate the dilapidated fort for their own purposes.
Fort Pallipuram	Fort	1661	1789	Fell under the command of Fort Cochin and meant to protect the latter. Sold to the Kingdom of Travancore in 1789.
Pathanamthitta	Factory	1663	1778	Well planned ancient town filled with Brahmins, Nayars, Malabar Jews, Mappilas and Malabar Nasranis near Purakkad known for trading pepper and fishing used as a vassal by Dutch Malabar.
Purakkad Factory	Factory	1662	?	Fell under the command of Fort Cochin.
Fort Quilon	Fort and factory	1661	1795	Quilon was a fortified city. The first Portuguese fort to be captured by the Dutch in December 1661. Capital of Dutch Malabar until the alliance with Cochin in 1663.
Kayamkulam Factory	Factory	1661	?	Fell under the command of Fort Quilon.
Fort Cannanore	Fort and factory	1663	1790	Cannanore was a city with a good harbour and a strong stone fort. Captured on 15 February 1663 from the Portuguese.
Vengurla Factory	Factory	1637	1693	Established before the establishment of the Malabar commandment to spy on the nearby Portuguese settlement of Goa. Fell directly under the command of Batavia until 1673, and then under command of Suratte. From 1676 onwards, the command was with Dutch Malabar.
Barselor Factory	Factory	1667	1682	Established by treaty with the local ruler. The unreinforced factory traded in rice and pepper and was closed in 1682 after problems with local merchants.

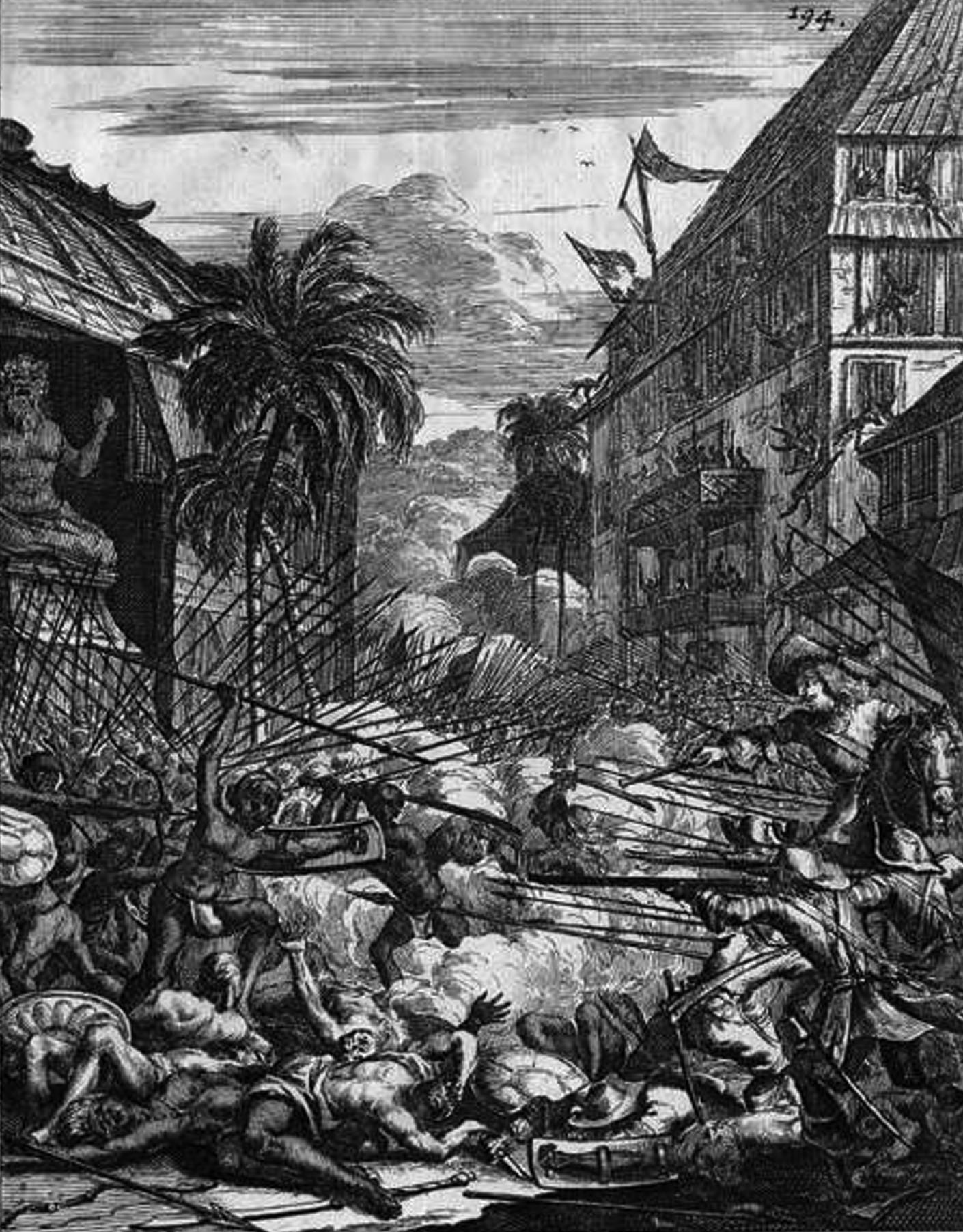
The Royal palace and temple of the Quilon ruler conquered by the Dutch, Dec. 1661

== Religious policy ==
Unlike the Catholic Portuguese, the Protestant Dutch did not try to convert indigenous Hindu peoples to Christianity. However, they helped the Saint Thomas Christians of Malabar, who had been around there since the 1st century, against the pressure of the Roman Catholic Church. They relied heavily for trade and diplomatic missions on the Paradesi Jewish merchants of Cochin, who thrived during the Dutch era. They also tolerated the Malabari Jews and provided asylum.

=== Dutch Occupation of the Thiruchendur Temple ===
The Murugan temple at Thiruchendur was occupied by the Dutch East India Company between the years 1646 to 1648, during the course of their war with the Portuguese. The local people tried during these 2 years to try and free their temple, with several futile attempts. The Dutch finally vacated the temple on orders from the Tirumala Nayaka. However, while vacating the temple, they hacked away and removed the idol of the main deity of the temple, and took it back to Galle, Dutch Ceylon. The idols was returned after many negotiations with the Madurai Nayakar.

== Commanders of the Dutch Malabar ==
Dutch Malabar was one area of the Dutch East India Company (Vereenigde Oost-Indische Compagnie or VOC in Dutch) ruled by a commander. This is a list of commanders.

- apr-nov 1663 Pieter de Bitter / Cornelis Valkenburg
- 1663–1665 Ludolph van Coulster
- 1665–1667 IJsbrand Godske
- 1667–1669 Lucas van der Dussen
- 1669–1676 Hendrik van Rheede
- 1676–1678 Jacob Lobs
- 1678–1683 Marten Huysman
- 1683–1687 Gelmer Vosburgh
- 1688–1693 Isaac Dielen
- 1693–1694 Alexander Wigman
- 1694–1696 Adriaan van Ommen
- 1697–1701 Magnus Wichelman
- 1701–1704 Abraham Vink
- 1704–1708 Willem Moerman
- 1708–1709 Adam van der Duijn
- 1709–1716 Barend Ketel
- 1716–1723 Johannes Hertenberg
- 1723–1731 Jacob de Jong
- 1731 Wouter Hendriks
- 1731–1734 Adriaan Maten
- 1734–1742 Julius Valentyn Stein van Gollenesse
- 1742–1747 Reinierus Siersma
- 1747–1751 Corijn Stevens
- 1751 Abraham Cornelis de la Haye
- 1751–1756 Frederik Cunes
- 1756–1761 Casparus de Jong
- 1761–1764 Godefried Weyerman
- 1764–1768 Cornelis Breekpot
- 1768–1770 Christiaan Lodewijk Senff
- 1770–1781 Adriaan Moens
- 1781–1793 Johan van Angelbeek
- 1793–1795 Jan Lambertus van Spall

== See also ==
- Malabar pepper
- List of commanders of Dutch Malabar
- Dutch Ceylon
- Dutch Coromandel

== Sources ==
- "Malabar" (in Dutch). De VOCsite.
