= Hendrik van Rheede =

Dutch military officer and colonial administrator

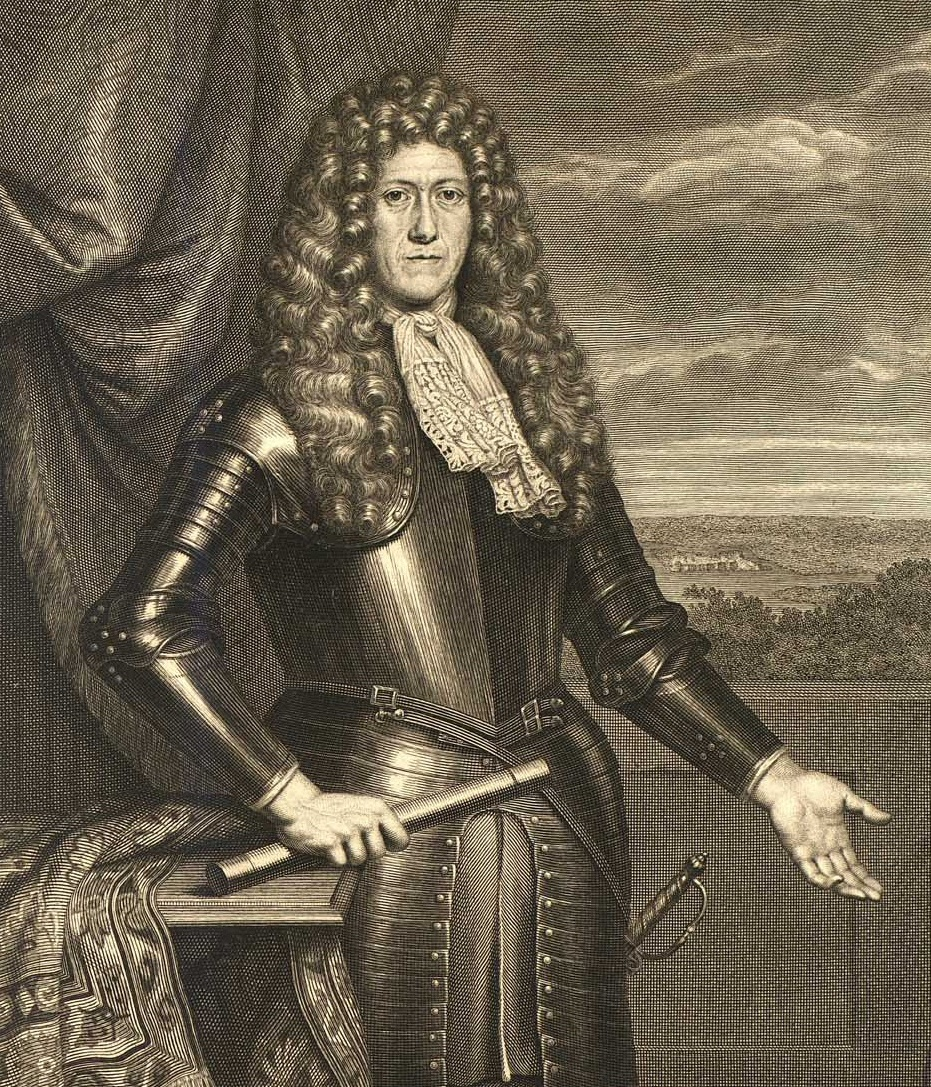
- Born: 13 April 1636; Amsterdam, Dutch Republic
- Died: 15 December 1691 (aged 55); At sea

Hendrik Adriaan van Rheede tot Drakenstein (13 April 1636 – 15 December 1691) was a Dutch military officer and colonial administrator of the Dutch East India Company. Between 1669 and 1676 he served as a governor of Dutch Malabar at Kochi and employed twenty-five people on his book Hortus Malabaricus, describing 740 plants in the region. As Lord of Mydrecht, he also played a role in the governance of the Cape colonies. Many plants such as the vine Entada rheedei are named for him. The standard author abbreviation Rheede is used to indicate this person as the author when citing a botanical name.

== Biography ==
Van Rheede was born into a family of noblemen that played a leading role in the political, administrative and cultural life of the province of Utrecht. His mother, Elisabeth van Utenhove, died in 1637 while his father, Ernst van Rheede, Council at the Admiralty of Amsterdam, died when he was four. Hendrik Adriaan, the youngest of seven children, left home at the age of fourteen. In 1656 he joined as a soldier in the Dutch East India Company (V.O.C., Vereenigde Oostindische Compagnie) and served alongside Johan Bax van Herenthals (who would also take an interest in natural history). Van Rheede served under Admiral Rijcklof van Goens in campaigns against the Portuguese on the west coast of India in erstwhile Dutch Malabar. He gained rapid promotion becoming an ensign. In 1663, during a siege of Cochin, he was ordered to arrest the old queen of Cochin Rani Gangadhara Lakshmi to keep her safe, and this act saved her life from the massacre of the royal family. The subsequent king of Cochin, Vir Kerala Verma was crowned by the VOC and Van Rheede was appointed as the 'regedore maior' or the first councillor of the kingdom of Cochin. Van Rheede maintained cordial relations with the king and helped him in administration as well as mediation with the other kingdoms of Malabar. During the next two years, van Rheede traveled extensively in Malabar on behalf of VOC to get trade monopolies from the Malabar princes by negotiations and occasionally using military forces against reluctant princes. In 1665 he was appointed as commander in Jaffna and had Johan Nieuhof who at the time was the Dutch chief at Tuticorin, arrested for smuggling pearls and sent to Batavia for trial.

In 1667 van Rheede was back in Malabar as the Chief of Quilon to undertake the management of the Company factory there. Quilon was the centre of the pepper, cinnamon and opium trade in South Malabar. However Van Rheede did not like his work there and tendered his resignation and was transferred back to Ceylon as the first captain in command of all troops of the Company there. In 1669 Van Rheede seems to have been forced to resign from the Dutch East India Company by Van Goens. The resignation was made as he opposed the repressive measures of Van Goens and instead favoured negotiation, but in 1670 he is appointed as commander of Dutch Malabar. In 1671 he fought with the Zamorin of Calicut. In 1672 he had to deal with the former VOC-employee François Caron, then serving the French East India Company.

In 1677 Van Rheede moved to Jakarta, being appointed in the Counsel of India. He stayed for about six months but the conflict with Van Goens grew fiercer. He returned to Amsterdam in June 1678. Since 1680 he could call himself Lord of Mijdrecht (Mydrecht). In 1681 he signed a contract with the botanists Jan Commelin and Johannes Munnicks and began work on the manuscript of the Hortus Malabaricus.

In 1684 he was empowered by the "directors" (Council of Seventeen) of the Company to inspect the Cape Colony, Ceylon and Dutch India to combat corruption within their employees. He appointed Isaac Soolmans to accompany him. They visited Simon van der Stel in Cape of Good Hope, and Groot Constantia; the area Groot Drakenstein was named after him. Van Rheede recommended measures for forestry and viniculture. Rheede, the Lord of Mydrecht, also made rules on how slaves would be treated and he decreed that slave children had to be taught to read and write with any flogging requiring permission. In 1687 Governor Van der Stel opened this region to farmers. Van Rheede was a bachelor, but had adopted a girl from Malabar with an unknown Dutch father. He met with Van Goens junior, an ambitious administrator on his way to Batavia. Both men didn't like each other at all. Some time before Van Goens had given orders—afraid for competition anywhere else in the world—to extirpate all the acclimatizating cinnamon trees which were destined for the Amsterdam Municipal Garden. It is possible that the rare trees for the Grand Pensionary Gaspar Fagel were then also destroyed.

Van Rheede sailed to Colombo and after two months to Bengal. He visited many VOC trading posts, especially around Hooghly. His next destination was the Coromandel and he stayed for one year in Nagapattinam. In 1690 he founded a seminary in Jaffna. Then he went to Tuticorin and Malabar. In the end of November 1691 he sailed to Dutch Suratte, but died at sea, off the coast of Bombay on 15 December 1691. Some authors suggest that he was poisoned by VOC employees while others that he was sick already for a while. Van Rheede was buried at Dutch Cemetery, Surat on 3 January 1692 in the presence of his daughter Francine and many notables. Among the attendants was also Van Rheede's secretary Hendrick Zwaardecroon, the future Governor-General of the Dutch East Indies.

== Work in natural history ==
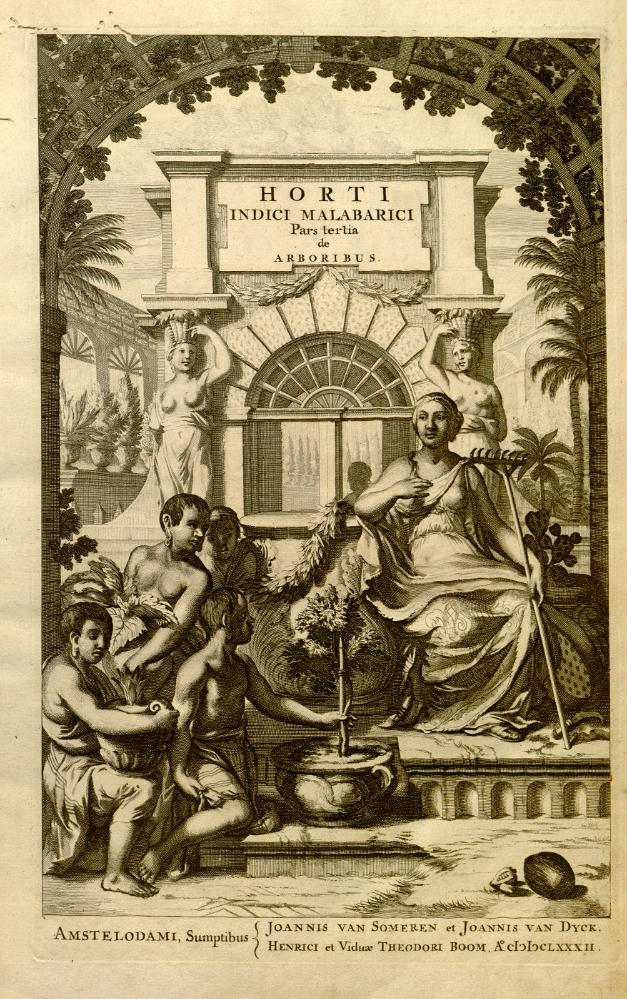
Frontispiece of volume 1

Hendrik van Rheede's work on the plants of the Malabar region began in 1674 and it was around 1675 that the draft of the first volume of the Hortus Malabaricus was produced. Since 1660, the Dutch East India Company had encouraged publication of scientific work and the documentation of the useful plants by Van Rheede would help in the fight against local diseases. The first volume of the Hortus Malabaricus was published in 1678, a compendium of the plants of economic and medical value in the south Indian Malabar region, was undertaken when "Jonkheer" Hendrik van Rheede was the Dutch Governor of Cochin and continued for the next three decades. It was published in twelve volumes in Latin, with the names of the plants written in four languages: Latin, Sanskrit, Arabic and Malayalam. Mentioned in these volumes are 742 plants of the Malabar region which in his time referred to the stretch along the Western Ghats from Goa to Kanyakumari. The ethno-medical information presented in the work was extracted from palm leaf manuscripts by a famous practitioner of herbal medicine named Itty Achuden. Achuden was an vaiydan ("healer") of the local Ezhava tradition (that has in recent times been included under the label of Kerala Ayurveda). He was supported by a team of three Konkani physicians: Appu Bhatt, Ranga Bhatt and Vinayaka Pandit, The compilations were edited by a team of nearly a hundred including physicians, professors of medicine and botany, amateur botanists (such as professor Arnold Seyn, Theodore Jansson of Almeloveen, Paul Hermann, Johannes Munnicks, Jan Commelin, Abraham Poot, the translator of a Dutch version), Indian scholars and vaidyas (physicians) of Malabar and adjacent regions, and technicians, illustrators and engravers, together with the collaboration of company officials, clergymen (Johannes Casearius and Father Mathew of St. Joseph). He was also assisted by the King of Cochin and the ruling Zamorin of Calicut.

Carl Linnaeus made use of Rheede's work, noting in the preface of his Genera Plantarum (1737) that he did not trust any authors except Dillen in Hortus Elthamensis, Rheede in Hortus Malabaricus and Charles Plumier on American plants and further noted that Rheede was the most accurate of the three. Many of Linneaeus' specific epithets based on Rheede originate from Malayalam names. While visiting the Cape in 1685, van Rheede considered a work on African plants of economic importance, Hortus Africanus, but this idea was never realized.
