= K. S. Manilal =

Indian botany scholar and taxonomist (1938–2025)

Kattungal S. Manilal
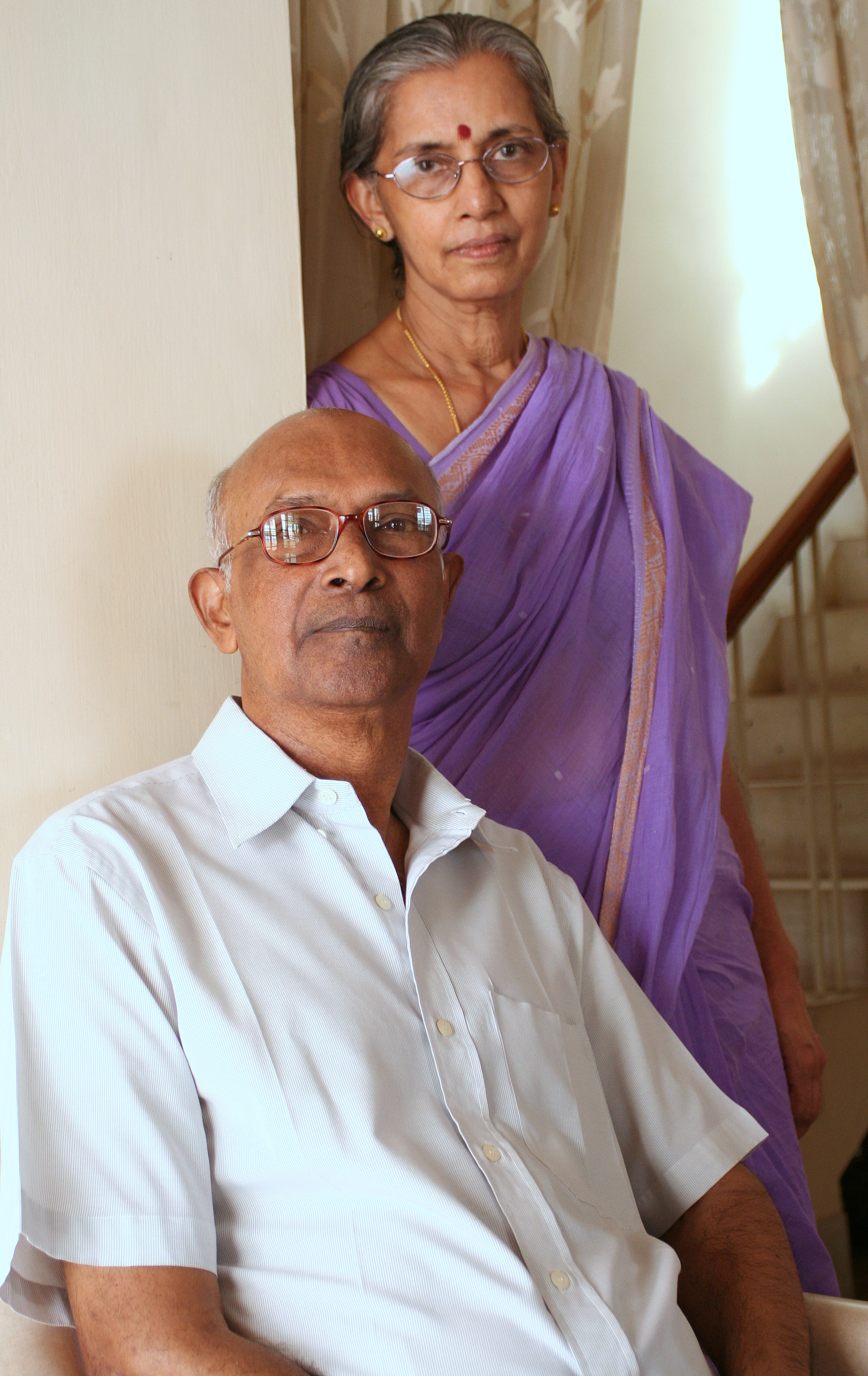
- Manilal and wife Jyotsna in 2008
- Born: Kattungal Subramaniam Manilal; 17 September 1938; Paravur, Kingdom of Cochin, India
- Died: 1 January 2025 (aged 86); Thrissur, Kerala, India
- Education: Sagar University
- Known for: Biodiversity studies, Discoveries at Silent Valley, Translation of Hortus Malabaricus to English and Malayalam
- Awards: Officer of the Order of Orange-Nassau
- Scientific career
- Fields: Botany, taxonomy
- Workplaces: University of Calicut, Royal Society of London, Westfield College, Bangor University, Smithsonian Institution
- Author abbrev. (botany): Manilal

Kattungal Subramaniam Manilal (17 September 1938 – 1 January 2025) was an Indian botany scholar and taxonomist, emeritus professor of the University of Calicut, a botany scholar and taxonomist, who devoted over 35 years of his life to research, translation and annotation work of the Latin botanical treatise Hortus Malabaricus. This epic effort brought to light the main contents of the book, a wealth of botanical information on Malabar that had largely remained inaccessible to English-speaking scholars, because the entire text was in the Latin language.

In January 2020, Manilal was conferred with the Padma Shri award, the fourth-highest civilian honour of India, for his contribution to the field of Science and Engineering.

Despite the existence of Hendrik van Rheede's Hortus Malabaricus over the last three centuries, the correct taxonomic identity of many plants listed in Hortus Malabaricus, their medicinal properties, methods of use, etc., as described and codified by renowned traditional medical authorities of 17th-century India remained inaccessible to English language based scholars, until Manilal commenced publication of research papers and books on Hortus Malabaricus.

His efforts ultimately resulted in an English edition of Hortus Malabaricus, for the first time, 325 years after its original publication from Amsterdam. The English edition contains a word by word translation of all the twelve volumes of the book, retaining the original style of language. Medicinal properties of plants are translated and interpreted, with commentaries on their Malayalam names given by Van Rheede. In addition, the correct scientific identity of all plants, acceptable under ICBN is set out along with their important synonyms and basionyms.

Whilst the scope of Manilal's contributions to botany extends far beyond the research and publications around Hortus Malabaricus, his research work on Hortus Malabaricus alone is of botanical and socio-historic significance, and can be broadly classified under two heads:

- Botanical and Medicinal aspects of Hortus Malabaricus; and
- Historical, Political, Social and Linguistic aspects of Hortus Malabaricus.

Manilal has over 198 published research papers and 15 books to his credit as author and co-author. He and his associates have credits for discovering over 14 species of flowering plants, varieties and combinations new to science. Dr. Manilal was the Founder President of the Indian Association for Angiosperm Taxonomy (IAAT).

== Early life and work ==
Manilal was born in the Kingdom of Cochin on 17 September 1938. He was one of three children born to his parents; father Advocate Kattungal A. Subramaniam (1914–1973) and mother K. K. Devaki (1919–1989). His father, was a practising advocate, also a writer, who authored the biography of Sahodaran Ayyapan. His family was from North Paravur in Kerala, India.

As a young boy, his interest was in Hortus Malabaricus was inspired by his father, whose avid reading habits and enthusiasm for sociology exposed him to a collection of books, and more specifically newspaper cuttings on Hortus Malabaricus during the late 1940s and 1950s.

He schooled initially at the Government Boys' High School, Kodungallur and later at the Government S.R.V. Boys' High School, Ernakulam. He did his undergraduate studies in botany at the Maharaja's College, Ernakulam, and later, he secured MSc Botany and PhD Degrees from University Teaching Department, Sagar, in Madhya Pradesh.

During his post-graduate studies, while on a study tour to the Forest Research Institute in Dehra Dun, He was able to see, for the first time, a set of volumes of the original Hortus Malabaricus. This was set of volumes acquired by the institute's library during the days of the British Raj, when the institute was called the Imperial Forest College. Manilal remarks "it fired my imagination!” on seeing a Latin book in which the names of plants were also written in native Malayalam language. Manilal maintained his interest in the book through his studies and professional life until 1969, when he commenced serious work on the transliteration of Hortus Malabaricus.

He stayed in Kozhikode.

== Research and achievements ==
=== Botanical and medicinal aspects of Hortus Malabaricus ===
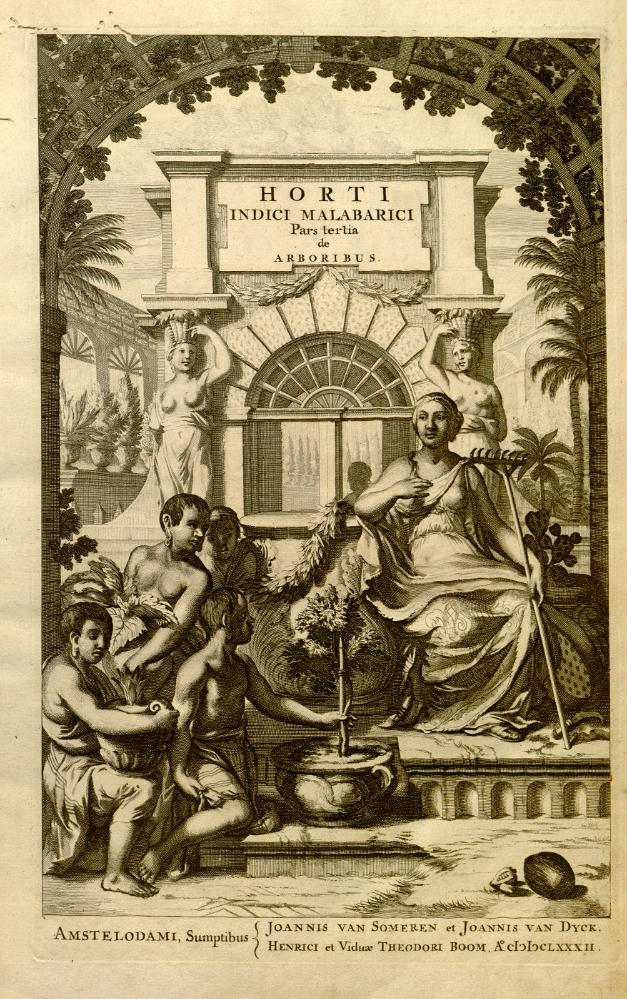
Frontispiece of the original Latin Hortus Malabaricus

As Hortus Malabaricus is a pre-Linnaean book, the scientific names of plants, equivalent to local Malayalam names, were not included. Since voucher specimens for the book are also not known to exist, the correct identity of many of the plants described was unclear and not verifiable to original specimens. Earlier attempts, over three centuries, by European and Indian botanists to correctly identify all specimens were futile. Under two research projects; one sponsored by the U.G.C. (1975–1978) and the other by the Smithsonian Institution (1984–1987), Manilal collected all plants, described in Hortus Malabaricus, from localities in Malabar from where they were originally collected in the 17th century. Specimens were subjected to detailed studies and their correct identities were established in consultation with research institutes in Europe and USA. Based on this work, initially a concise reference book: An Interpretation of Van Rheede's Hortus Malabaricus, was published (with his collaborators) from Berlin (1988), by the IAPT. This remains the only book by Indian authors published by them (IAPT) till date and is an essential resource in study on the taxonomy of Southeast Asian plants.

Richard H. Grove, in his book Green Imperialism: Colonial Expansion, Tropical Island Edens and the Origins, states that Itty Achudan and his team selected the plants which were to be drawn and included in Hortus Malabaricus, with accurate identification and mentioning of vernacular (local) name of the plants. Itty Achudan also disclosed the medicinal and other uses of the plants which was known to him from his own experience as a herbal physician and from the 'palmleaf scripture' carried by his family as 'wealth of knowledge'. Achudan dictated the material, in his native Malayalam language, which was then translated into Latin. Hortus Malabaricus was compiled over a period of nearly 30 years and published in Amsterdam during 1678–1693.

=== Historical, political, social and linguistic aspects of Hortus Malabaricus ===
The compilation and publication of Hortus Malabaricus is intimately connected with the history of India, politics of the 17th century Netherlands and the then social conditions of Malabar. It is also an important source of information, and the oldest printed, authentic document, on the evolution of Malayalam language and script. Manilal studied these aspects for over 35 years bringing to light many interesting facts, some of which were included in his book: Botany & History of Hortus Malabaricus, published from Rotterdam and Delhi (1980). Another book, in Malayalam: A study on the role of Itty Achudan in the compilation of Hortus Malabaricus, was published from Kozhikode in 1996.

In the research paper published in the journal Global Histories, entitled "Plants, Power and Knowledge: An Exploration of the Imperial Networks and the Circuits of Botanical Knowledge and Medical Systems on the Western Coast of India Against the Backdrop of European Expansionism", Malavika Binny states that Kerala had medical traditions that existed even prior to Ayurvedic tradition. As per the author, Ezhava Tradition of Healing Practices or 'Ezhava vaidyam', as it is called, was prominent among other medical traditions that existed in Kerala which involved a considerable contribution from Buddhism which was a major force from the sixth century to about the eleventh century. This Buddhist tradition of treatment of diseases using plants and the knowledge of the indigenous plants preserved by the Ezhavas was exploited by the European endeavour as suggested by the inclusion of Itty Achuden in the compilation of Hortus Malabaricus which is basically an ethno-botanical treatise on the flora of Malabar. Van Rheede's motivation to compile a book on the natural plant wealth of Malabar was to prove his belief that Malabar is self-sufficient in all requirements of military and commerce and hence that Cochin was better suited to be the south east Asian Headquarters of the Dutch overseas forces, compared to Colombo in Ceylon.

Information is also available in the text of Hortus Malabaricus not only about the vegetation in 17th century Malabar, but also about the general social conditions prevalent in those days. Significant inferences could also be drawn on some of these matters, indirectly from the data available in the book. Several research papers have been published by Manilal on these topics. Some more, particularly on the different Numerals and Numerical Systems used in Hortus and their sociological implications and significances in the Indian society, are under preparation.

=== Taxonomic and biodiversity studies in Kerala ===
Manilal pioneered taxonomic research and biodiversity studies in Kerala by training a genre of young taxonomists and identifying and cataloguing local plants in biodiversity-rich South India. A comprehensive study on the flora of the Greater Kozhikode area, consisting of the western sectors of the present day Kozhikode and Malappuram districts, covering an area of about 600 km^{2}. was started in 1969. When completed in 1975, this work resulted in recording about one thousand species of flowering plants from the region, including several species recorded for the first time in India and importantly seven species new to science. Based on this work, a book: Flora of Calicut, was published (from Dehra Dun), and was taken as a model for subsequent research in India.

=== Research and revelations at Silent Valley ===
In the 1970s, when a proposal to build a hydro-electric project in Silent Valley triggered political controversy in Kerala due to an impending ecological disaster, the Government of Kerala appointed an experts' committee of scientists to study, inventorise and report on Silent Valley's flora and fauna. The experts' committee reported that the forests there could not be classified as tropical evergreen rainforests and that they contain only 240 species of flowering plants, which are also found elsewhere, and also that the Valley does not possess any new or rare species. Despite protests by environmentalists the State Government was about to go ahead with the project, only awaiting a clearance form the Central Government. At this juncture, the Department of Science and Technology (India) accepted Manilal's proposal to study the flora of Silent Valley and also required him to make a general study of the ecological status of the forests.

Over a four-year period commencing 1981, Manilal and research assistants undertook a study that brought to light:

- A record of nearly 1,000 species of flowering plants;
- Seven species new to science;
- Several plants believed to be found only in Sri Lanka, Philippines, etc.;
- Some species which were believed to be extinct, such as the Malabar Daffodil, which was last seen in 1850 by a scientist named Thomas C. Jerdon in Nilgiris;
- Rare medicinal plants until then known to grow only in the islands of Philippines;
- Many endemics of the neighbouring countries, where their existence was threatened, were found to have migrated to these forests for safety.

Further Manilal's study found that the Silent Valley forests fulfilled required parameters of tropical evergreen rainforests and, therefore, could be rightly so classified. His work was soon considered as model of how taxonomists could assist in solving socio-environmental issues; and many scientists and journalists from Europe, Africa and South America visited Silent Valley to study the working of this project.

=== Orchids of Kerala ===
Detailed studies of the orchid wealth of Kerala were started by Manilal in the late 1970s, including their taxonomy, anatomy, biology and floral evolution, which are essential for any further studies on their hybridisation. During these studies, contrary to the highest expectations, over 215 species of orchids were collected, including species that were till then believed to be extinct, like the ladies' slipper orchid Paphiopedilum druryii.

=== Origin and evolution of the flower ===
Manilal led studies on the directions of evolution of flowers and the structure and anatomy of various floral organs in cash crops such as coconut palms, grasses (rice), orchids, compositae (sun flower), rubiales (coffee), etc. Many enigmas in these subjects could be solved, and results were published in around 45 research papers. These studies have, besides seeing the flower as the most significant part of the plant, with biological, commercial, aesthetic, evolutionary and taxonomic importance, also promoted success in hybridisation and breeding experiments, to create new high-yielding varieties.

=== Radioactive resistant marine phyto-planktonic algae ===
As the beaches in southern Kerala and Tamil Nadu (particularly in the Districts of Kollam and Nagarcoil) have natural deposits of radioactive minerals causing genetic damage to flora and fauna, Manilal undertook studies to familiarise with the techniques of research in the field of radiation ecology. These studies were undertaken at the Marine Biology Laboratory of North Wales University at Menai Bridge, Wales. The Royal Society of London granted Manilal a Visiting Scientist-ship for this work for two years in 1971–1972.

Two species of marine phyto-planktonic algae were discovered, which could withstand a very high degree of radioactivity. It was found that these species could absorb and adsorb as much as 40 times their body weight of the radioactive Thorium compounds from surrounding seawater, and continue to live normally. In the 1970s these findings were farfetched to be accepted for publication in a journal in U.K. However, on Manilal's return to India, a part of these findings was published in the journal Current Science (1975), by the Indian Institute of Science. About ten years later, some British scientists did a similar work and their results were published in the prestigious U.K. journal Nature, and wide publicity in the press as a biotechnological break-through. Dr. Manilal's experiments (and the subsequent work by the British scientists) show that such marine planktonic algae could be used to quickly and safely clean up ocean surfaces where radio-active materials have accumulated, by cultivating such algae in a specific area and later removing them from there.

=== Indian Association for Angiosperm Taxonomy (IAAT) ===
Manilal was instrumental in establishing the Indian Association for Angiosperm Taxonomy (IAAT). Manilal, as founder President, established IAAT in the year 1990 with its headquarters located at the Department of Botany, University of Calicut, Kozhikode, India. The IAAT works to promote the science of Angiosperm Taxonomy in India, to provide a common forum for Angiosperm taxonomists in India to organise meetings, hold discussions and exchange ideas on scientific and academic matters, and encourage collaborative work among taxonomists. The IAAT publishes a journal Rheedea (named after Hendrik van Rheede). The Indian Association for Angiosperm Taxonomy works as an affiliate of the International Association for Plant Taxonomy.

From 1969 Manilal commenced training research students in Taxonomy (leading to PhD degree in the subject), with a view to attain self-sufficiency in Taxonomy. During the years 1972–1998, he and his students discovered over 240 new species of flowering plants and several new records for India from Kerala, and published many research papers in Taxonomy in national and international journals.

=== Biomass Research Centre ===
A Biomass Research Centre was established by Manilal in the University of Calicut, with funding from the Ministry of Non-conventional Energy Sources. The Centre does research and field experiments to establish the (taxonomic) identification of fast-growing fuel-wood trees suitable for various agro-climatic zones of Kerala.

== Death ==
Manilal died on 1 January 2025, at the age of 86.

== Summary of Manilal's discoveries ==
New species and varieties discovered, and combinations established by Manilal and his research associates are summarised as follows:

New species discovered in Silent Valley

- Liparis indiraii Manilal & C.S.Kumar
- Eria tiagii Manilal & C.S.Kumar
- Hydnocarpus pendulus Manilal, T.Sabu & Sivar.
- Robiquetia josephiana Manilal & C.S.Kumar
- Sauropus saksenianus Manilal, Prasann. & Sivar.
- Cucumella silentvaleyi Manilal, T.Sabu & P.J.Mathew
- Oberonia bisaccata Manilal & C.S.Kumar

New species discovered under biodiversity studies

- Hedyotis erecta Manilal & Sivar.
- Cinnamomum nicolsonianum Manilal & Shylaja
- Bulbophyllum rheedei Manilal & C.S.Kumar
- Heliotropium keralense Sivar. & Manilal
- Borreria malabarica Sivar. & Manilal
- Phyllanthus kozhikodianus Sivar. & Manilal
- Habenaria indica C.S.Kumar & Manilal

New varieties of flowering plants discovered

- Borreria stricta (L. f.) K.Schum. var. rosea; Sivar. & Manilal
- Borreria articularis (L. f.) F.N.Williams var. hispida Sivar. & Manilal
- Portulaca oleracea L. var. linearifolia Sivar. & Manilal

New combinations established

- Thunbergia bicolour (Wight) Manilal & Suresh
- Eria chandrasekharanii (Bharg. & Moh.) C.S.Kumar & Manilal

== Notable awards and positions held ==
=== Awards ===
- Padma Shri award by Government of India (2020)
- Officer of the Order of Orange-Nassau award (Dutch: Orde van Oranje-Nassau) by Her Majesty Queen Beatrix of the Netherlands. (The Consul General of the Kingdom of the Netherlands, Ms. Marijke A. van Drunen Littel conferred this honour on 1 May 2012, at Kozhikode, Kerala, India.)
- E.K. Janaki Ammal National Award for Taxonomy (2003) – Constituted by The Ministry of Environment and Forests
- Y. D. Tyagi Gold Medal (1998) – by the Indian Association of Angiosperm Taxonomy (IAAT)
- Vishwambhar Puri Medal (1990) – by The Indian Botanical Society

=== Positions ===
- Chief Editor, Rheedea, The Journal of Indian Association of Angiosperm Taxonomy (1991–present)
- President, Botanical Society of India (1999)
- Treasurer, Botanical Society of India (1984–1986)
- Founding President, Indian Association of Angiosperm Taxonomy (1991)
- Chairman, CRIKSC (Centre for Research in Indigenous Knowledge, Science & Culture)

=== Plants named in honour of Manilal (eponyms) ===
- Lindernia manilaliana Sivar. (Kew Bull. 31: 151. 1976)
- Fimbristylis manilaliana Govind. (Rheedea 8(1): 87, f. 1. 1998)
- Cyathocline manilaliana C.P.Raju & R.R.V.Raju (Rheedea 9 (2): 151–154. 1999)
- Schoenorchis manilaliana M. Kumar & Sequiera (Kew Bull. 55: 241. 2000)
- Cololejeunea manilali Manju, Chandini & K.P.Rajesh (Acta Bot. Hung. 59(1–2): 262, 1–2. 2017)
- Fissidens manilalia Manju, C.N., Manjula, K.M. & K.P. Rajesh (The Bryologist 120 (3): 263–269. 2017)
- Isachne manilaliana Sunil, K.M.P. Kumar & Thomas (Webbia 72: 161–164. 2017)

== Publication of the English and Malayalam versions of Hortus Malabaricus ==
=== Publisher's appeal for donation of royalties ===
Hortus Malabaricus as transliterated by Manilal was published in English and Malayalam languages in 2003 and 2008 respectively. Manilal's copyright, as author of the English and Malayalam versions, was bequeathed, free of royalties, to the publishers, the University of Kerala. This assignment of rights was a gesture by Manilal in good faith and in response to a specific appeal from the then Vice-Chancellor of the University of Kerala, that the university wanted to generate funds from this publication for utilisation of such royalty incomes toward re-publication of old Malayalam classical works, which are out of print, and not forecasted to generate a viable level of income due to limited sale of such classical works.

=== Book-release functions conducted by the publishers ===
In a recorded interview with Manilal in August 2008, he expressed his regret and frustration at the manner in which the publishers subjected him to digression from the publication project soon after he legally assigned his rights as author. Apparently there was a move to exclude Manilal's name from the book (2003), but was reinstated on account of questions raised by the academic community. On 14 August 2008, the University of Kerala officials again conducted a function at Thiruvananthapuram to formally release the Malayalam edition of Hortus Malabaricus. The book was released by the Governor of Kerala (also Chancellor of the university), at the function; where due recognition was not given to Manilal as author of the book, nor were arrangements in place to felicitate the author at the function. . The former Vice-Chancellor of University of Kerala who initiated the project, B. Ekbal, was also not invited to this function.

== Books authored ==
- 2012. MANILAL, K.S. Hortus Malabaricus and the Socio-Cultural Heritage of India. Indian Association of Angiosperm Taxonomy (IAAT), Kozhikode.
- 2008. MANILAL, K.S. Van Rheede's Hortus Malabaricus. Malayalam Edition, with Annotations and Modern Botanical Nomenclature (12 Vols.) University of Kerala, Trivandrum. (ISBN 81-86397-82-5)
- 2004. MANILAL, K.S. & C. SATHISH KUMAR Orchid Memories: A tribute to Gunnar Seidenfaden. Mentor Books, Kozhikode and Indian Association for Angiosperm Taxonomy, Kozhikode. (ISBN 81-900324-6-1)
- 2003. MANILAL, K.S. Van Rheede’s Hortus Malabaricus. English Edition, with Annotations and Modern Botanical Nomenclature. (12 Vols.) University of Kerala, Trivandrum. (ISBN 81-86397-57-4)
- 1998. MANILAL, K.S. & M.S. MUKTESH KUMAR A Handbook on Taxonomy Training. DST, New Delhi.
- 1998. MANILAL, K.S. & K. RAVEENDRAKUMAR Companion to Gamble’s Flora: Additions to the Flora of Kerala since Gamble (1935). Mentor Books, Kozhikode.
- 1996. MANILAL, K.S. Hortus Malabaricus and Itty Achuden: A study on the role of Itty Achuden in the compilation of Hortus Malabaricus (In Malayalam). Mentor Books, Kozhikode/ P.K.Brothers, Kozhikode.(ISBN 81-900324-1-0).
- 1996. MANILAL, K.S. Directory of Indian Taxonomists. Mentor books, Kozhikode.
- 1996. MANILAL, K.S. & A.K. PANDEY Taxonomy and Plant Conservation. C.B.S. Publishers & Distributors, New Delhi. (ISBN 81-239-0444-4)
- 1994. SATHISH KUMAR, C. & K.S. MANILAL A Catalogue of Indian Orchids. Bishen Singh Mahendrapal Singh, Dehra Dun. (ISBN 81-211-0100-X).
- 1993. MANILAL, K.S. & C. SATHISH KUMAR Field Key for the Identification of the Native Orchids of Kerala. Mentor Books, Kozhikode.
- 1988. NICOLSON, D.H., C.R. SURESH & K.S. MANILAL An Interpretation of Van Rheede’s Hortus Malabaricus. International Association of Plant Taxonomists, Berlin, Germany/ Koeltz Scientific Books, Konigstein, Germany. (ISSN 0080-0694 Regnum Vegetabile)
- 1988. MANILAL, K.S. Flora of Silent Valley Tropical Rain Forests of India. Department of Science & Technology, Government of India, Kozhikode.
- 1982. MANILAL, K.S. & V.V. SIVARAJAN The Flora of Calicut: The Flowering Plants of the Greater Calicut Area. Bishen Singh Mahendrapal Singh, Dehra Dun.
- 1980. MANILAL, K.S. The Botany & History of Hortus Malabaricus. A.A.Balkema, Rotterdam, Netherlands/ Oxford & IBH, New Delhi. (ISBN 90-6191-071-4).
- 1976. MANILAL, K.S. & V.V.SIVARAJAN Flowering Plants of the Calicut University Campus. University of Calicut, Kerala. India.

== Video resources ==
- 2012: Officer of the Order of Orange-Nassau (Orde van Oranje-Nassau) award.
- 2014: A travelogue by Mangad Ratnakaran – K. S. Manilal (Translation of Hortus Malabaricus to English and Malayalam.)
- 2019: KS Manilal.
- 2020: Padma Shri award.
- 2020: Padma honour for Description Professor K. S. Manilal.
- 2020: Padma Shri award to Prof. KS Manilal
