= Achudemia myriantha =

Scientific classification
- Kingdom: Plantae
- Clade: Tracheophytes
- Clade: Angiosperms
- Clade: Eudicots
- Clade: Rosids
- Order: Rosales
- Family: Urticaceae
- Genus: Achudemia
- Species: A. myriantha

Binomial name
- Achudemia myriantha (Dunn) L.F.Fu & Y.G.Wei

Synonyms
- Aboriella myriantha (Dunn) Bennet; Dunniella myriantha (Dunn) Rauschert; Pilea myriantha (Dunn) C.J.Chen, nom. illeg.; Pilea spicata C.J.Chen & A.K.Monro; Smithiella myriantha Dunn

Genus of flowering plants

Achudemia myriantha is a species of flowering plants in the family Urticaceae, native to the eastern Himalayas and Tibet. When placed in the genus Aboriella as Aboriella myriantha, it was the only species.
