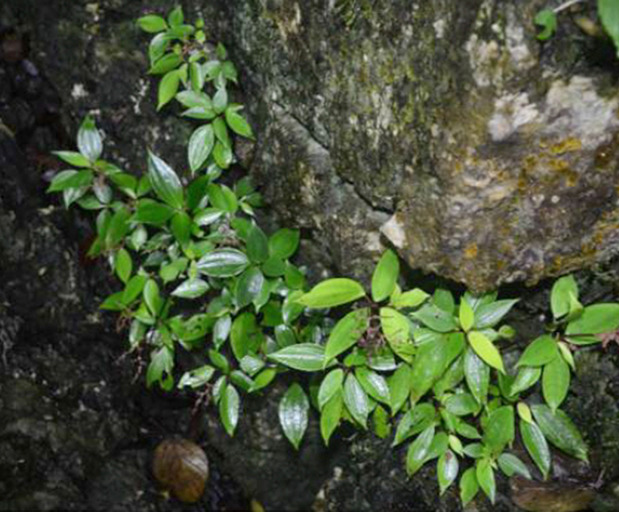
- Achudemia boniana

Scientific classification
- Kingdom: Plantae
- Clade: Tracheophytes
- Clade: Angiosperms
- Clade: Eudicots
- Clade: Rosids
- Order: Rosales
- Family: Urticaceae
- Genus: Achudemia; Blume

Synonyms
- Aboriella Bennet; Dunniella Rauschert; Smithiella Dunn

= Achudemia =

Genus of flowering plants

Achudemia is a genus of plants belonging to the family Urticaceae. It is sometimes also treated as a section of the genus Pilea.

== Species ==
Species accepted by the Plants of the World Online as of March 2023:

- Achudemia boniana (Gagnep.) L.F.Fu & Y.G.Wei
- Achudemia hilliana (Hand.-Mazz.) L.F.Fu & Y.G.Wei
- Achudemia japonica Maxim.
- Achudemia myriantha (Dunn) L.F.Fu & Y.G.Wei
- Achudemia subpubera (Miq.) Y.G.Wei & A.K.Monro
