= Johannes Munnicks =

Dutch physician (1652-1711)

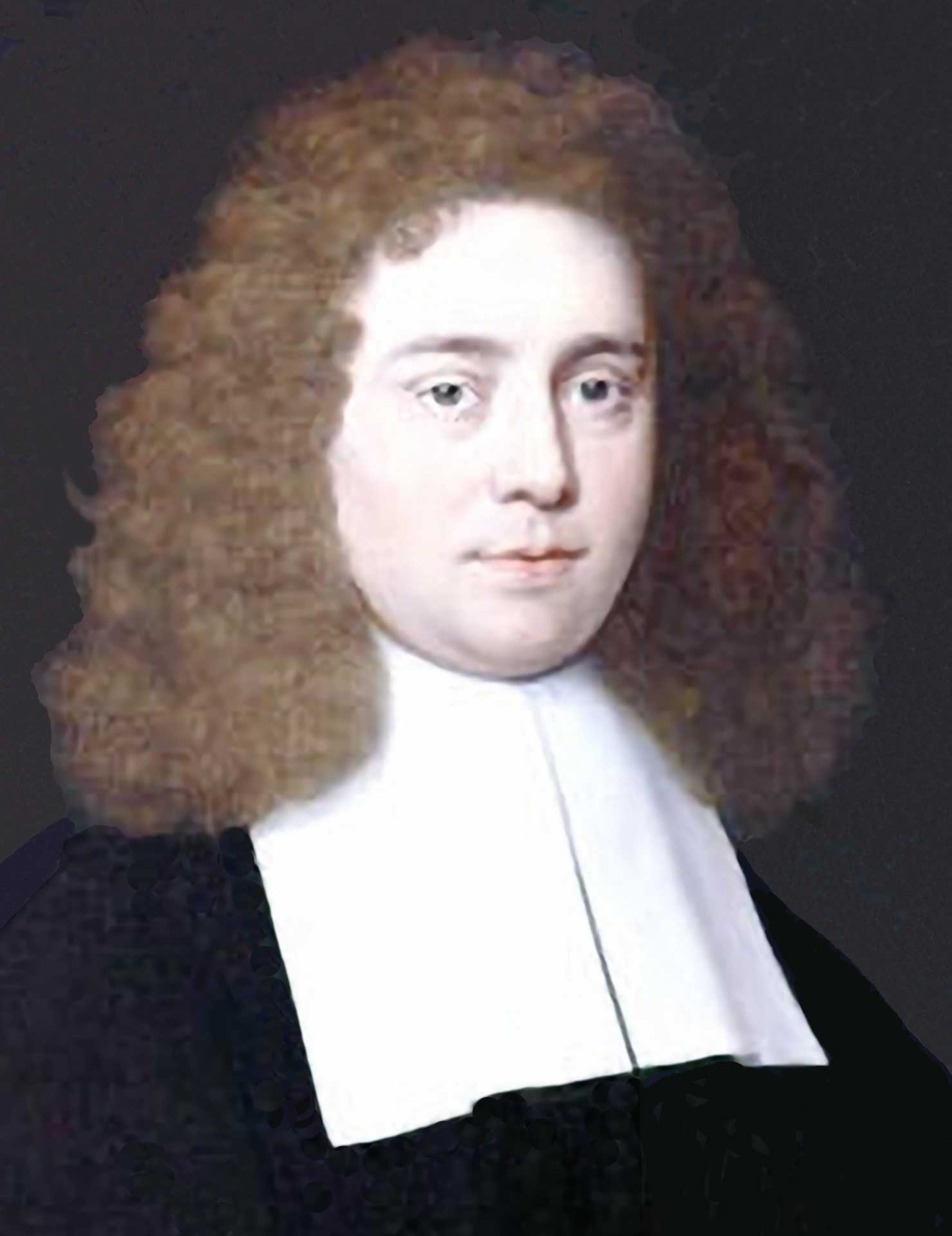
Johannes Munnicks, by Cornelis Janson van Ceulen II

Johannes Munnicks or Jean Munniks, Munnix, Munnicx, Munnigk, Munick, Jan Munnickius (16 October 1652 – 10 June 1711) was a Dutch Golden Age medical doctor and writer from the Dutch Republic.

== Biography ==
Munnicks was born in Utrecht. He was the son of a pharmacist who attended the University of Utrecht and who later became a rector there. On 13 December 1670 he graduated with the thesis de Fluore muliebri under Isbrand van Diemerbroeck and became Doctor of Medicine. He wrote Tractatus de urinus, earumque inspectione (Utrecht 1674, Dutch: Verhandelinge der wateren, en hoe men dezelve bezien moet von D. van Haagstraten, Dordrecht 1683). In 1677 he wrote De utilitate anatomiae and became Lector of Anatomy in Utrecht. In 1678 he became professor of Chirurgie or Surgical Anatomy.

He became city physician of Utrecht.

== Works ==
- Chirurgia ad praxin hodiernam adornata, in qua veterum pariter ac neotericorum dogmata dilucide exponuntur (Utrecht 1686)
- Liber de re anatomica (Utrecht 1697)
- Complete Works (Amsterdam 1740 posthumously by G. Dicten)
