= Pappinivattom =

- village
- Location in Kerala, India Pappinivattom (India)
- Coordinates: 10.295880°N 76.158090°E
- Country: India
- State: Kerala
- District: Thrissur

Population (2011)
  - Total: 15,336

Languages
  - Official: Malayalam, English
- Time zone: UTC+5:30 (IST)
- PIN: 6XXXXX
- Vehicle registration: KL-

Pappinivattom is a village in the Thrissur district of Kerala, India. It is located near the cities of Mathilakam and Kodungallur.

== Demographics ==
As of 2011 India census, Pappinivattom had a population of 15336 with 6909 males and 8427 females.
