= Theodorus Janssonius van Almeloveen =

Dutch physician

Theodorus Janssonius van Almeloveen (24 July 1657 – 28 July 1712) (Theodoor Jansson) was a Dutch physician, and the learned editor of various classical and medical works. He was born at Mijdrecht, near Utrecht, where his father was minister of the reformed church. His mother, Mary Jansson, was related to the celebrated printer of Amsterdam, Jan Jansson.

After studying at Utrecht University under various eminent men, such as Johann Georg Graevius for belles lettres, de Vries for philosophy, Johann Leusden for theology, Johannes Munniks and Jacob Vallan (1637–1720), for medicine, etc., he determined to give up his father's profession, for which he had been intended, and devote himself to medicine. He became doctor of medicine at Utrecht in 1681.

In 1687, he settled at Gouda, where he married. He founded a learned society there in 1692. In 1697, he was invited to Harderwijk, to become professor of Greek and history; and in 1702, he was appointed professor of medicine, retaining both offices until his death.

He was an untiring author and editor, and acquired the highest reputation as a teacher, and for his scholarship, science, and particularly for his great bibliographical knowledge. For this specialty, it has been suggested, he may have been indebted to the opportunities of observation afforded him by his uncle Jan Jansson, the printer, whose name he bore.

He had a great knowledge of books. Besides editions with notes of Strabo, Juvenal, Quintilian, the Aphorisms of Hippocrates, Celsus, Apicius, Aurelian on Diseases, and Decker's Treatise on Supposititious Writings, he has left a work in Dutch on the anatomy of the muscles, several bibliographical treatises in Latin, among which are a work—De Vitis Stephanorum, a list of Plagiaries, and a list of books promised that never appeared.

In his Inventa nov-antiqua (1684), he discusses in detail, with a strong bias towards antiquity, the question of how far the discoveries in contemporary medicine were anticipated by ancient physicians. In this particular field, therefore, he sustains the "ancients versus moderns" thesis taken up by others, and which, in its greatest amplitude, led to the serious debates of Sir William Temple and William Wotton, and to Jonathan Swift's satirical The Battle of the Books.

In his Plagiariorum Syllabus (1694), he lists authors—including biblical, classical, and contemporary writers—who have plagiarized expressions from previous writers. His list includes Andrea Alciato, Bodin, Calvin, Casaubon, Heinsius, Junius, Justus Lipsius, Petrus Ramus, Claudius Salmasius, Scaliger, and Henry Estienne, among others.

== Works ==
- De Vitis Stephanorum. 8°. Amsterdam. 1683.
- Aphorismi Hippocratis. Amsterdam, 1685.
- Inventa nov-antiqua. 8°. Amsterdam. 1684.
- Opuscula, sive Antiquitatum è sacris profanarum Specimen. 8°. Amsterdam. 1686.
- Bibliotheca promissa et latens, Gouda 1692.
- Amoenitates Theologico-philologicae. 8°. Amsterdam. 1694.
- Epigrammata vetera. 8°. Amsterdam. 1694.
- Plagiariorum Syllabus. 8°. Amsterdam. 1694.

== Bibliography ==
Saskia Stegeman, “How to set up a scholarly correspondence. Theodorus Janssonius van Almeloven (1657-1712) aspires to membership of the Republic of Letters”, LIAS, XX, 1993, p. 227-243 Saskia Stegeman, Patronage and services in the Republic of Letters : the network of Theodorus Janssonius van Almeloveen (1657-1712), Amsterdam, APA-Holland University Press, 2005, XVI-612 p.
